= 2014 Buenos Aires 200km =

Autódromo Juan y Óscar Gálvez No 8

The 2014 200 km of Buenos Aires was the seventh edition of this race in the TC2000 season. The race was held in the Autódromo Juan y Óscar Gálvez in Buenos Aires.

== Report ==
Néstor Girolami and Mauro Giallombardo won the 2014 Buenos Aires 200 km. Girolami started the race in their Peugeot 408 and attempted to build a lead before handing the car to Giallombardo. Their main rivals included teammates Agustín Canapino and Rafael Morgenstern.

The guest of arrecifeño was chosen to start the race. And He did more than that until lap 29 ° in which he pitted to return the car to Canapino, endured Mariano Werner (Fiat Petronas) and maintained a reasonable difference, considering it was his first time with the cars more technological country.

After entering and affect change in 32.711 seconds, Canapino hit the track in search of his teammate to overcome and win the competition. With this result and d in sixth position he would leave the Buenos Aires circuit with the points lead.

Meanwhile, Esteban Guerrieri (Toyota Team Argentina) with Ricardo Risatti, mate Leonel Pernía in the Renault LoJack Team because they were looking forward positions in the middle of a squad that dominated to grow Girolami.

Until he decided to pit to give your self Giallombardo. The tension in the pits and the public was overwhelming to know how it would change for the pilot Isla Verde on track because their work was perfect. And it happened. The Peugeot 408 pitted calmly, as if he knew what the end would be. He headed the box led by Ulises Armellini and came. Only took 28.860 seconds to realize it. Yes, it was four seconds faster than Canapino.

Consummate change Giallombardo Peugeot took over and began to recall within this time last edition in 2010 that had played at the Hermanos Galvez when -the triumphed, but as a guest of Toyota and Bernardo Llaver.

All those memories began to appear in the young pilot that was once Bernal Renault race driver. Until he met with a second safety car (the first was on Lap 18) by a car misplaced Nicolas Traut (Ford Focus- Riva Racing). Almost 50 seconds apart with Canapino had vanished quickly.

It was resumed and only had five minutes to spare career with five pilots who was in a position to be the winners: Giallombardo, Canapino, Brazilian Daniel Serra (co- Werner), Pernia and Fontana.

In the first bounce speed, Fontana overcame Pernia and Serra to stay third. Also appearing on stage Facundo Ardusso, who came in a big comeback. When you reach the fork, Ardusso, Canapino and Pernia made a great move by bending the three together. That brought a touch that left Pernia left rubber faulty. At the end of the line, with no control over his car, the driver rammed Tandil Canapino leaving him out of the race and cutting its goal to win and keep the tip of the race.

Giallombardo was heading to victory followed by Fontana and Ardusso. And thus achieved his second win in the 200 km of Buenos Aires and reached the record of being the only driver to repeat the success in this test. He also became the fourth victory in the category Girolami (the last was in Potrero de los Funes 2012) and the first in this competition.

Moreover, Peugeot reached 19 ° victory in the divisional and became the fifth brand imposed 200 kilometers.

== Race results ==
Pos	No	Team	Drivers	Chassis	Tyre	Laps
Pos	No	Team	Drivers	Engine	Tyre	Laps
1	8	Peugeot LoJack Team	(Argentina) Néstor Girolami (Argentina) Mauro Giallombardo	Peugeot 408	P	50
1	8	Peugeot LoJack Team	(Argentina) Néstor Girolami (Argentina) Mauro Giallombardo	Radical V8	P	50
2	14	Chevrolet-YPF	(Argentina) Norberto Fontana (Argentina) Mariano Altuna	Chevrolet Cruze	P	50
2	14	Chevrolet-YPF	(Argentina) Norberto Fontana (Argentina) Mariano Altuna	Radical V8	P	50
3	5	Fiat Petronas	(Argentina) Facundo Ardusso (Brazil) Caca Bueno	Fiat Linea	P	50
3	5	Fiat Petronas	(Argentina) Facundo Ardusso (Brazil) Caca Bueno	Radical V8	P	50
4	11	Renault LoJack Team	(Argentina) Emiliano Spataro (Argentina) Luis Jose di Palma	Renault Fluence	P	50
4	11	Renault LoJack Team	(Argentina) Emiliano Spataro (Argentina) Luis Jose di Palma	Radical V8	P	50
5	16	Chevrolet-YPF	(Argentina) Matias Milla (Argentina) Gianfranco Collino	Chevrolet Cruze	P	50
5	16	Chevrolet-YPF	(Argentina) Matias Milla (Argentina) Gianfranco Collino	Radical V8	P	50
6	4	Renault LoJack Team	(Argentina) Guillermo Ortelli (Brazil) Valdeno Brito	Renault Fluence	P	50
6	4	Renault LoJack Team	(Argentina) Guillermo Ortelli (Brazil) Valdeno Brito	Radical V8	P	50
7	27	Peugeot LoJack Team	(Argentina) Julian Santero (Brazil) Felipe Maluhy	Peugeot 408	P	50
7	27	Peugeot LoJack Team	(Argentina) Julian Santero (Brazil) Felipe Maluhy	Radical V8	P	50
8	6	Toyota Team Argentina	(Argentina) Mariano Werner (Brazil) Daniel Serra	Toyota Corolla	P	50
8	6	Toyota Team Argentina	(Argentina) Mariano Werner (Brazil) Daniel Serra	Radical V8	P	50
9	22	Fiat Petronas	(Argentina) Christian Ledesma (Argentina) Matias Russo	Fiat Linea	P	50
9	22	Fiat Petronas	(Argentina) Christian Ledesma (Argentina) Matias Russo	Radical V8	P	50
10	9	Toyota Team Argentina	(Argentina) Bernardo Llaver (Argentina) Emmanuel Cáceres	Toyota Corolla	P	50
10	9	Toyota Team Argentina	(Argentina) Bernardo Llaver (Argentina) Emmanuel Cáceres	Radical V8	P	50
11	10	Toyota Team Argentina	(Argentina) Agustin Calamari (Argentina) Javier Merlo	Toyota Corolla	P	50
11	10	Toyota Team Argentina	(Argentina) Agustin Calamari (Argentina) Javier Merlo	Radical V8	P	50
12	29	RAM Racing	(Argentina) Mario Gerbaldo (Argentina) Luciano Farroni	Ford Focus	P	50
12	29	RAM Racing	(Argentina) Mario Gerbaldo (Argentina) Luciano Farroni	Radical V8	P	50
13	30	RAM Racing	(Argentina) Antonio Garcia (Argentina) Roberto Curia	Ford Focus	P	50
13	30	RAM Racing	(Argentina) Antonio Garcia (Argentina) Roberto Curia	Radical V8	P	50
14	13	Chevrolet-YPF	(Argentina) Franco Vivian (Switzerland) Alain Menu	Chevrolet Cruze	P	49
14	13	Chevrolet-YPF	(Argentina) Franco Vivian (Switzerland) Alain Menu	Radical V8	P	49
15	21	Fiat Petronas	(Argentina) Ignacio Julian (Argentina) Gustavo Der Ohanessian	Fiat Linea	P	49
15	21	Fiat Petronas	(Argentina) Ignacio Julian (Argentina) Gustavo Der Ohanessian	Radical V8	P	49
16	7	Peugeot LoJack Team	(Argentina) Agustín Canapino (Argentina) Rafael Morgestern	Peugeot 408	P	48
16	7	Peugeot LoJack Team	(Argentina) Agustín Canapino (Argentina) Rafael Morgestern	Radical V8	P	48
17	3	Renault LoJack Team	(Argentina) Leonel Pernia (Argentina) Ricardo Risatti	Renault Fluence	P	48
17	3	Renault LoJack Team	(Argentina) Leonel Pernia (Argentina) Ricardo Risatti	Radical V8	P	48
18	1	Toyota Team Argentina	(Argentina) Matias Rossi (Argentina) Gabriel Ponce de Leon	Toyota Corolla	P	47
18	1	Toyota Team Argentina	(Argentina) Matias Rossi (Argentina) Gabriel Ponce de Leon	Radical V8	P	47
19	18	Fe Peugeot Junior Equipe	(Argentina) Facundo Chapur (Argentina) Lucas Benamo	Peugeot 408	P	42
19	18	Fe Peugeot Junior Equipe	(Argentina) Facundo Chapur (Argentina) Lucas Benamo	Radical V8	P	42
20	19	Lanús Motorsports	(Argentina) Daniel Belli (Argentina) Adrian Chiriano	Chevrolet Cruze	P	41
20	19	Lanús Motorsports	(Argentina) Daniel Belli (Argentina) Adrian Chiriano	Radical V8	P	41
21	17	Fe Peugeot Junior Equipe	(Argentina) Damian Fineschi (Brazil) Galid Osman	Peugeot 408	P	39
21	17	Fe Peugeot Junior Equipe	(Argentina) Damian Fineschi (Brazil) Galid Osman	Radical V8	P	39
22	26	JM Motorsport	(Argentina) Ariel Pecci (Argentina) Augusto Scalbi	Chevrolet Cruze	P	38
22	26	JM Motorsport	(Argentina) Ariel Pecci (Argentina) Augusto Scalbi	Radical V8	P	38
23	37	Traut Competición	(Argentina) Nicolas Traut (Argentina) Roberto Arato	Chevrolet Cruze	P	35
23	37	Traut Competición	(Argentina) Nicolas Traut (Argentina) Roberto Arato	Radical V8	P	35
24	2	Toyota Team Argentina	(Argentina) Esteban Guerrieri (Brazil) Ricardo Zonta	Toyota Corolla	P	25
24	2	Toyota Team Argentina	(Argentina) Esteban Guerrieri (Brazil) Ricardo Zonta	Radical V8	P	25
25	25	JM Motorsport	(Argentina) Franco Riva (Argentina) Federico Moises	Chevrolet Cruze	P	19
25	25	JM Motorsport	(Argentina) Franco Riva (Argentina) Federico Moises	Radical V8	P	19
26	23	Riva Racing	(Argentina) Javier Manta (Argentina) Federico Eensslin	Peugeot 408	P	17
26	23	Riva Racing	(Argentina) Javier Manta (Argentina) Federico Eensslin	Radical V8	P	17
27	15	Chevrolet-YPF	(Argentina) Matías Muñoz Marchesi (Argentina) Lucas Colombo Rusell	Chevrolet Cruze	P	10
27	15	Chevrolet-YPF	(Argentina) Matías Muñoz Marchesi (Argentina) Lucas Colombo Rusell	Radical V8	P	10
28	12	Renault LoJack Team	(Argentina) Fabián Yannantuoni (Argentina) Martin Basso	Renault Fluence	P	1
28	12	Renault LoJack Team	(Argentina) Fabián Yannantuoni (Argentina) Martin Basso	Radical V8	P	1
