= 2016 Buenos Aires 200km =

Touring car race

Autódromo Juan y Óscar Gálvez No 9

The 2016 200 km of Buenos Aires was the seventh edition of this race in the TC2000 season. The race was held in the Autódromo Juan y Óscar Gálvez in Buenos Aires.

== Race results ==
Pos	No	Team	Drivers	Chassis	Tyre	Laps
Pos	No	Team	Drivers	Engine	Tyre	Laps
1	5	YPF Chevrolet	(Argentina) Agustin Canapino (Argentina) Guillermo Ortelli	Chevrolet Cruze	P	44
1	5	YPF Chevrolet	(Argentina) Agustin Canapino (Argentina) Guillermo Ortelli	Radical V8	P	44
2	7	Toyota Team Argentina	(Argentina) Matias Rossi (Argentina) Gabriel Ponce de León	Toyota Corolla	P	44
2	7	Toyota Team Argentina	(Argentina) Matias Rossi (Argentina) Gabriel Ponce de León	Radical V8	P	44
3	12	Renault Sport	(Argentina) Christian Ledesma (Argentina) Mauro Giallombardo	Renault Fluence	P	44
3	12	Renault Sport	(Argentina) Christian Ledesma (Argentina) Mauro Giallombardo	Radical V8	P	44
4	13	YPF Chevrolet	(Argentina) Matias Munoz Marchesi (Argentina) Augusto Scalbi	Chevrolet Cruze	P	44
4	13	YPF Chevrolet	(Argentina) Matias Munoz Marchesi (Argentina) Augusto Scalbi	Radical V8	P	44
5	4	Renault Sport	(Argentina) Facundo Ardusso (Argentina) Franco Vivian	Renault Fluence	P	44
5	4	Renault Sport	(Argentina) Facundo Ardusso (Argentina) Franco Vivian	Radical V8	P	44
6	87	M&M Group	(Argentina) Fabricio Pezzini (Argentina) Luciano Ventricelli	Fiat Linea	P	44
6	87	M&M Group	(Argentina) Fabricio Pezzini (Argentina) Luciano Ventricelli	Radical V8	P	44
7	26	Escudería FE	(Argentina) Luciano Farroni (Netherlands) Tom Coronel	Peugeot 408	P	44
7	26	Escudería FE	(Argentina) Luciano Farroni (Netherlands) Tom Coronel	Radical V8	P	44
8	8	Toyota Team Argentina	(Argentina) Esteban Guerrieri (Brazil) Ricardo Zonta	Toyota Corolla	P	44
8	8	Toyota Team Argentina	(Argentina) Esteban Guerrieri (Brazil) Ricardo Zonta	Radical V8	P	44
9	3	Renault Sport	(Argentina) Leonel Pernia (Argentina) Julian Santero	Renault Fluence	P	44
9	3	Renault Sport	(Argentina) Leonel Pernia (Argentina) Julian Santero	Radical V8	P	44
10	18	Toyota Team Argentina	(Argentina) Matías Milla (Argentina) Franco Girolami	Toyota Corolla	P	44
10	18	Toyota Team Argentina	(Argentina) Matías Milla (Argentina) Franco Girolami	Radical V8	P	44
11	22	Renault Sport	(Argentina) Germán Sirvent (Argentina) Gerardo Salaverria	Renault Fluence	P	44
11	22	Renault Sport	(Argentina) Germán Sirvent (Argentina) Gerardo Salaverria	Radical V8	P	44
12	27	YPF Chevrolet	(Argentina) Facundo Conta (Argentina) Marcelo Ciarrocchi	Chevrolet Cruze	P	43
12	27	YPF Chevrolet	(Argentina) Facundo Conta (Argentina) Marcelo Ciarrocchi	Radical V8	P	43
13	19	Team Peugeot Total Argentina	(Argentina) Damian Fineschi (Brazil) Galid Osman	Peugeot 408	P	43
13	19	Team Peugeot Total Argentina	(Argentina) Damian Fineschi (Brazil) Galid Osman	Radical V8	P	43
14	23	Riva Racing	(Argentina) Franco Riva (Argentina) Franco Coscia	Peugeot 408	P	42
14	23	Riva Racing	(Argentina) Franco Riva (Argentina) Franco Coscia	Radical V8	P	42
15	14	YPF Chevrolet	(Argentina) Manuel Mallo (Argentina) Diego Azar	Chevrolet Cruze	P	41
15	14	YPF Chevrolet	(Argentina) Manuel Mallo (Argentina) Diego Azar	Radical V8	P	41
16	25	Escuderia FE	(Argentina) Javier Manta (Argentina) Oscar Fineschi	Peugeot 408	P	38
16	25	Escuderia FE	(Argentina) Javier Manta (Argentina) Oscar Fineschi	Radical V8	P	38
DNF	6	YPF Chevrolet	(Argentina) Norberto Fontana (Brazil) Daniel Serra	Chevrolet Cruze	P	35
DNF	6	YPF Chevrolet	(Argentina) Norberto Fontana (Brazil) Daniel Serra	Radical V8	P	35
DNF	10	Fiat Petronas	(Argentina) Carlos Javier Merlo (Argentina) Martin Moggia	Fiat Linea	P	33
DNF	10	Fiat Petronas	(Argentina) Carlos Javier Merlo (Argentina) Martin Moggia	Radical V8	P	33
DNF	31	Fiat Petronas	(Argentina) Bernardo Llaver (Argentina) Emmanuel Cáceres	Fiat Linea	P	33
DNF	31	Fiat Petronas	(Argentina) Bernardo Llaver (Argentina) Emmanuel Cáceres	Radical V8	P	33
DNF	00	Team Peugeot Total Argentina	(Argentina) Mariano Werner (Argentina) Nestor Girolami	Peugeot 408	P	33
DNF	00	Team Peugeot Total Argentina	(Argentina) Mariano Werner (Argentina) Nestor Girolami	Radical V8	P	33
DNF	16	Escudería FE	(Argentina) Lucas Benamo (Argentina) Esteban Tuero	Peugeot 408	P	33
DNF	16	Escudería FE	(Argentina) Lucas Benamo (Argentina) Esteban Tuero	Radical V8	P	33
DNF	33	JM Motorsport	(Argentina) Federico Braga (Argentina) Hugo Ballester	Chevrolet Cruze	P	26
DNF	33	JM Motorsport	(Argentina) Federico Braga (Argentina) Hugo Ballester	Radical V8	P	26
DNF	15	Escudería FE	(Argentina) Lucas Colombo Russell (Argentina) Facundo Regalia	Peugeot 408	P	24
DNF	15	Escudería FE	(Argentina) Lucas Colombo Russell (Argentina) Facundo Regalia	Radical V8	P	24
DNF	11	Renault Sport	(Argentina) Emiliano Spataro (Argentina) Luis José Di Palma	Renault Fluence	P	24
DNF	11	Renault Sport	(Argentina) Emiliano Spataro (Argentina) Luis José Di Palma	Radical V8	P	24
DNF	17	Toyota Team Argentina	(Argentina) Rafael Morgenstern (Argentina) Ricardo Risatti	Toyota Corolla	P	22
DNF	17	Toyota Team Argentina	(Argentina) Rafael Morgenstern (Argentina) Ricardo Risatti	Radical V8	P	22
DNF	20	Team Peugeot Total Argentina	(Argentina) Facundo Chapur (Brazil) Ricardo Mauricio	Peugeot 408	P	22
DNF	20	Team Peugeot Total Argentina	(Argentina) Facundo Chapur (Brazil) Ricardo Mauricio	Radical V8	P	22
DNF	21	Renault Sport	(Argentina) Ignacio Julián (Argentina) Humberto Krujoski	Renault Fluence	P	20
DNF	21	Renault Sport	(Argentina) Ignacio Julián (Argentina) Humberto Krujoski	Radical V8	P	20
DNF	2	Team Peugeot Total Argentina	(Argentina) Fabián Yannantuoni (Argentina) Matias Rodriguez	Peugeot 408	P	13
DNF	2	Team Peugeot Total Argentina	(Argentina) Fabián Yannantuoni (Argentina) Matias Rodriguez	Radical V8	P	13
DNF	9	Fiat Petronas	(Argentina) José Manuel Urcera (Brazil) Valdeno Brito	Fiat Linea	P	4
DNF	9	Fiat Petronas	(Argentina) José Manuel Urcera (Brazil) Valdeno Brito	Radical V8	P	4
