= 2009 Buenos Aires 200km =

Autódromo Juan y Óscar Gálvez No 12

The 2009 200 km of Buenos Aires was the sixth edition of this race in the TC2000 season. The race was held in the Autódromo Juan y Óscar Gálvez in Buenos Aires.

== Report ==
The driver pairing formed by Norberto Fontana-Ricardo Mauricio (Toyota Corolla-TTA) won the sixth edition of the “Buenos Aires 200 Kilometres”, which took place today at the Autódromo Oscar y Juan Gálvez, in the city of Buenos Aires. Runners-up were José María López-Anthony Reid (Honda New Civic-Equipo Petrobras) and third were Christian Ledesma-José Ciantini (Chevrolet Vectra-Chevrolet Elaion). The circuit was damp when the race began, and there was bright sunshine by the time it ended, which meant that the teams had to change the type of tyres their cars were using. An additional ingredient for this classic event.

Having dominated proceedings during the entire weekend, Fontana and Mauricio had no trouble whatsoever in claiming victory in front of the 45,000 spectators which were present for the sixth edition of the race, making the most of the fantastic Toyota Corolla and using good pit strategy which allowed them to keep ahead at all times. Once again, the Buenos Aires 200 Kilometres did not allow any of the drivers to repeat victory and a new driver pairing lifted the cup, the same as Toyota, which thus won this race in Buenos Aires for the first time.

“We did a great job and formed an excellent team. We finally achieved this win. All the team worked very well and Diego Bruna did his job impeccably. This race I will always remember, because of what it means to win in Buenos Aires, because of my nephew who won the Formula Renault 1.6 (Ricardo Trosset) race. Everything turned as we had planned it. This is a perfect dream,” said Fontana during the press conference.

Fontana drove the first stint and began edging away from Matías Rossi's Renault Mégane II (Renault Lo Jack Team), aboard a Corolla which adapted very well to the damp track, due to the great performance of the car during pre-event testing at the “Oscar Cabalén” circuit in Córdoba, which led to the Japanese product being very quick through the fast swerves of the circuit variant No. 12.

As the laps passed by, Fontana dominated at ease, while the track gradually dried out and this meant the teams had to change their strategies during the event, as all cars had started with wet tyres and the tyre compound began wearing out on the drying track. The unexpected also happened in the fact that the safety car was deployed on lap six due to the stranded VW Bora of Gustavo Der Ohanessian.

With the cars again bunched up, it looked as of Rossi might challenge Fontana for the lead, but the aspirations of Rossi did not get him anywhere, as Fontana once again eked out a gap. Behind them came Fabián Yannatuoni (DTA) who was doing a great job in third place, ahead of Martín Basso (YPF-Ford) and Cacá Bueno (Equipo Petrobras), while Scotland's Anthony Reid fell to ninth place.

When lap 15 arrived, the pitstops for driver changes, and due to the drying track, tyre changes, began. This changed everyone's plans, as the mechanics concentrated on changing the tyres, while the drivers had to do their changes unassisted. In this aspect, the Toyota pitwork was very good and Mauricio was able to quickly reclaim the lead which Fontana had worked so hard to maintain.

“We claimed a very important win and this was on the basis of continuous work from all the team, which did a great job during the pre-event tests and throughout these last three years during which I was invited to compete in this race,” said Brazil's Mauricio.

Behind the leader, his countryman Camilo (Renault Lo Jack team) was trying to defend second place, having to fend off Lionel Ugalde (Ford-YPF) who had taken over the Ford Focus from Martín Basso and Pechito López (Equipo Petrobras), who was already at the wheel of the Honda New Civic which Reid had previously driven. López overtook Ugalde and on that same lap went in pursuit of the Renault, alongside which he did one of the race's most outstanding manoeuvres, these two cars going side by side throughout the Curvón Salotto, the back straight and the Ascari Chicane, prior to the cars rubbing sides and losing time.

Camilo fell back at that moment, down to fifth place, while López recovered and claimed the runner-up spot after having overtaken Ugalde. “We changed some things in the car, which were very risky, but things turned out well and that allowed me to close in on the leader. For me, this is like a victory, if we think in the championship. I’m very grateful to Anthony who at his age continues giving us one hundred and fifty percent; he sometimes seems to be younger than me,” said López.

On his part, Reid stated: “My start was not so good due to the car’s balance. As the track dried, the car went better. The driver change at the pits was fantastic.”

Ledesma and Ciantini did an outstanding job, reaching the podium after starting from 11th on the grid with the Chevrolet Vectra of the Chevrolet Ealion team, thanks to a strategy decided at the last moment, when Ciantini drove the first stint. “We practised the strategy with me doing the first stint, but last night I woke up and began thinking that we needed to change it; I had a feeling. I told the team that we had to change and they were doubtful. Luckily we did so and it all turned out very well, the same as the driver change,” said Ledesma.

Behind them came, in fourth place Basso-Ugalde (Ford Focus-Ford YPF), fifth Rossi-Camilo (Renault Megane II-Renault Lo Jack Team), sixth Silva-Bueno (Honda New Civic-Equipo Petrobras), seventh Spataro-Maluhy (Fíat Línea-Fiat Pro Racing Team), eighth Pernía-Canapino (Honda New Civic-Equipo Petrobras), ninth Yannantuoni-Flaqué (Chevrolet Astra-DTA) and tenth Carducci-Diruscio (Ford Focus-DP1 Team).

== Results ==
Position	Number	Driver	Car
1		(Argentina) Norberto Fontana (Brazil) Ricardo Mauricio	Toyota Corolla
2	1	(Argentina) José María López (United Kingdom) Anthony Reid	Honda Civic
3		(Argentina) Christian Ledesma (Argentina) Jose Ciantini	Chevrolet Astra
4		(Argentina) Martín Basso (Argentina) Lionel Ugalde	Ford Focus
5		(Argentina) Matías Rossi (Brazil) Thiago Camilo	Renault Megane
6	2	(Argentina) Juan Manuel Silva (Brazil) Caca Bueno	Honda Civic
7		(Argentina) Emiliano Spataro (Brazil) Felipe Maluhy	Fiat Linea
8		(Argentina) Leonel Pernía (Argentina) Agustín Canapino	Honda Civic
9		(Argentina) Fabián Yannantuoni (Argentina) Fabian Flaque	Chevrolet Astra
10		(Argentina) Leandro Carducci (Argentina) Sebastian Diruscio	Ford Focus
11		(Argentina) Matías Muñoz Marchesi (Argentina) Guillermo Albertengo	Chevrolet Astra
12		(Argentina) Omar Martínez (Argentina) Mariano Altuna	Fiat Linea
13		(Argentina) Esteban Tuero (Argentina) Lucas Benamo	Peugeot 307
14		(Argentina) Luis José di Palma (Argentina) Jose Luis Di Palma	Ford Focus
15		(Argentina) Franco Coscia (Argentina) Rafael Morgenstern	Toyota Corolla
16		(Argentina) Franco Berardi (Argentina) Henry Martin	Peugeot 307
17		(Argentina) Daniel Belli (Argentina) Matias Cohen	Honda Civic
18		(Argentina) Maximiliano Baumgartner (Argentina) Ezequiel Baldinelli	Renault Megane
19		(Argentina) Damián Fineschi (Argentina) Gonzalo Perlo	Honda Civic
20		(Argentina) Rubén Salerno (United States) Ricky Joseph	Volkswagen Bora
21		(Argentina) Bernardo Llaver (Argentina) Pablo Piumetto	Honda Civic
22		(Argentina) Andres Ríos (Argentina) Julio Francischetti	Honda Civic
23		(Argentina) Marcelo Bugliotti (Argentina) German Suárez	Honda Civic
24		(Argentina) Emanuel Moriatis (Argentina) Diego Aventín	Toyota Corolla
25		(Argentina) Gabriel Ponce de León (Brazil) Daniel Serra	Ford Focus
26		(Argentina) Guillermo Ortelli (Switzerland) Alain Menu	Chevrolet Vectra
27		(Argentina) Lucas Armellini (Argentina) Roberto Luna	Honda Civic
28		(Argentina) Santiago Ventana (Argentina) Jorge Trebbiani	Chevrolet Astra
29		(Argentina) Nestor Riva (Argentina) Omar El Bacha	Honda Civic
30		(Argentina) Néstor Girolami (Argentina) Esteban Guerrieri	Renault Megane
31		(Argentina) Gustavo Der Ohanessian (Argentina) Adrian Chiriano	Volkswagen Bora
32		(Argentina) Mariano Werner (Argentina) Carlos Okulovich	Toyota Corolla
