= 2010 Buenos Aires 200km =

Autódromo Juan y Óscar Gálvez No 12

The 2010 200 km of Buenos Aires was the seventh edition of this race in the TC2000 season. The race was held in the Autódromo Juan y Óscar Gálvez in Buenos Aires.

== Results ==
| Position | Number | Driver | Car |
|---|---|---|---|
| 1 | 32 | (Argentina) Bernardo Llaver (Argentina) Mauro Giallombardo | Toyota Corolla |
| 2 | 10 | (Argentina) Facundo Ardusso (Argentina) Agustín Canapino | Toyota Corolla |
| 3 | 9 | (Argentina) Mariano Werner (Argentina) Esteban Guerrieri | Toyota Corolla |
| 4 | 4 | (Argentina) Néstor Girolami (Argentina) Matías Russo | Honda Civic |
| 5 | 12 | (Argentina) Christian Ledesma (France) Yvan Muller | Chevrolet Vectra |
| 6 | 7 | (Argentina) Norberto Fontana (Brazil) Ricardo Mauricio | Ford Focus |
| 7 | 31 | (Argentina) Francisco Troncoso (Argentina) Rafael Morgenstern | Toyota Corolla |
| 8 | 3 | (Argentina) Leonel Pernía (Argentina) Ricardo Risatti | Honda Civic |
| 9 | 11 | (Argentina) Guillermo Ortelli (Switzerland) Alain Menu | Chevrolet Vectra |
| 10 | 5 | (Argentina) Juan Manuel Silva (Brazil) Felipe Maluhy | Renault Megane |
| 11 | 51 | (Argentina) Ignacio Char (Argentina) Juan Manuel López | Fiat Linea |
| 12 | 37 | (Argentina) Santiago Ventana (Argentina) Germán Suárez | Honda Civic |
| 13 | | (Argentina) Fabricio Pezzini (Argentina) Hanna Abdallah | Honda Civic |
| 14 | 27 | (Argentina) Rubén Salerno (Argentina) Gustavo Der Ohanessian | Volkswagen Bora |
| 15 | 15 | (Argentina) Fabián Yannantuoni (Argentina) Jose Yannantuoni | Peugeot 307 |
| 16 | 24 | (Argentina) Leonel Larrauri (Argentina) Oscar Larrauri | Honda Civic |
| 17 | | (Argentina) Javier Manta (Argentina) Gustavo Fontana | Honda Civic |
| 18 | | (Argentina) Gonzalo Fernández (Argentina) Alejandro Berganza | Volkswagen Bora |
| 19 | 18 | (Argentina) Juan Cruz Alvarez (France) Nicolas Minassian | Peugeot 307 |
| 20 | 6 | (Argentina) Matías Rossi (Argentina) Guido Falaschi | Renault Megane |
| 21 | 35 | (Argentina) Martín Basso (Argentina) Lionel Ugalde | Ford Focus |
| 22 | | (Argentina) Nicolás Ursprung (Uruguay) Ignacio Moreira | Volkswagen Bora |
| 23 | | (Argentina) Jorge Cersósimo (Argentina) Gaston Ricardo | Volkswagen Bora |
| 24 | 13 | (Argentina) Emanuel Moriatis (Argentina) Diego Aventín | Fiat Linea |
| 25 | 1 | (Argentina) José María López (Italy) Gabriele Tarquini | Honda Civic |
| 26 | 2 | (Argentina) Mariano Altuna (Argentina) Jorge Trebbiani | Honda Civic |
| 27 | 14 | (Argentina) Emiliano Spataro (Argentina) Ezequiel Baldinelli | Fiat Linea |
| 28 | 25 | (Argentina) Daniel Belli (Argentina) Adrián Chiriano | Honda Civic |
| 29 | 8 | (Argentina) Gabriel Ponce de León (Brazil) Daniel Serra | Ford Focus |
| 30 | 43 | (Argentina) Franco Coscia (Argentina) Lucas Benamo | Peugeot 307 |
| 31 | 16 | (Argentina) Matías Muñoz Marchesi (Argentina) Guillermo Albertengo | Peugeot 307 |
| 32 | 17 | (Argentina) Luis José di Palma (Argentina) Franco Vivian | Peugeot 307 |
| 33 | 40 | (Argentina) Leandro Carducci (Sweden) Stefan Johansson | Fiat Linea |
| 34 | 39 | (Argentina) Ezequiel Bosio (Argentina) Marcelo Bugliotti | Fiat Linea |
