= 2006 Buenos Aires 200km =

Autódromo Juan y Óscar Gálvez No 12

The 2006 200 km of Buenos Aires is the third edition of this touring car race on the TC2000 season. The race was held in the Autódromo Juan y Óscar Gálvez in Buenos Aires.

== Report ==
In front of more than 45,000 spectators, displaying much aptitude and aplomb, Argentina's Matías Rossi and Switzerland's Alain Menu, aboard a Chevrolet Astra of the Chevrolet Elaion team, the pairing came home winners of the third edition of the Buenos Aires 200 km, round 12 of the Argentinian TC2000 Championship. Second place went to Martín Basso and Brazil's Hoover Orsi (Ford YPF), and third to Fabián Flaqué and Ernesto Bessone (RV Competición). Buenos Aires, October 29, 2006.- In front of more than 45.000 spectators, displaying much aptitude and aplomb, Argentina's Matías Rossi and Switzerland's Alain Menu, aboard a Chevrolet Astra of the Chevrolet Elaion team, the pairing came home winners of the third edition of the Buenos Aires 200 km, round 12 of the Argentinian TC2000 Championship. Second place went to Martín Basso and Brazil's Hoover Orsi (Ford YPF), and third to Fabián Flaqué and Ernesto Bessone (RV Competición).

Rossi and Menu, gave shape to a duo which dominated at Buenos Aires, because the "Grenadier" (as Rossi is known) -who drove the first stint- climbed through the field from 8th on the grid, to first place, and handed over his car in perfect condition to his co-driver, who kept it in front and escaped even further from his pursuers.

Apart from the show provided by these two, in this event of TC2000, there are many things to point out which gave the day a special brilliance and added more ingredients to the fight for the title. The other contenders, Gabriel Ponce de León (Ford-YPF) and Juan Manuel Silva (Honda Petrobras Lubrax) faced a series of problems and did not add to their championship tally.

Deception came quickly for "Pato" Silva, as on lap 3 he saw as his car's race ended after his co-driver was nerfed off the track by Flaqué (who stated that it was "unavoidable") at the exit of Ascari and ended up in the barriers.

For Ponce de León the story was different, but finished in the same way. The driver from Junín started from 10th and was in 7th place when he stopped at the pits for the driver change on lap 17. After a very quick driver change (15 secs) the number 1 Focus stalled, but the team got it going rapidly again. All would come to an end when Brazil's David Muffato overdid things and hit the tyre barriers.

While their rivals encountered trouble, Rossi climbed through the field and from 4th, shortly after the start, he got past Flaqué on the back straight before the end of lap 1 and did the same with Ortelli (Renault Mégane) on lap 3, and a lap later he overtook Basso superbly at Salotto, with a move that will remain in everyone's minds for a long time.

Once in the lead, the only remaining official Chevrolet driver (Christian Ledesma and Marcelo Bugliotti had already retired) began to worked out an advantage by way of several lap records, while behind him, Basso and Ortelli fought it out for second, closely followed by Emiliano Spataro (Sport team), Diego Aventín (Honda Petrobras Podium) and Norberto Fontana (Toyota Team Argentina).

As from lap 15, driver changes were allowed. Rossi stopped and handed over to Menu, while Ortelli overtook Basso on lap 16, and soon after Basso stopped. But, in the best Formula One style, the Ford team was quicker than the Renault pits staff and Orsi went out onto the track before Verna could retain 2nd place.

After the mentioned driver changes, Spataro took the lead and tried to edge away from his rivals prior to his pit stop, but his efforts were not enough and co-driver Cacá Bueno went back to the track in 3rd behind Menu and Orsi. Flaqué was also coming through the field and claimed 2nd place following the pit stops before he handed over his Ford Focus to Ernesto Bessone on lap 20.

After the driver change period, Menu was a comfortable leader, with a 14secs cushion over Orsi, who in turn was followed by Bueno, Verna and Bessone, who would be one of the leading protagonists of the latter stages of the race, together with Switzerland's Menu and Brazil's Felipe Maluhy (Lucas Benamo's co-driver in the Renault TC2000 Team).

Menu set a number of lap records and increased his advantage on his way to a resounding victory. Bessone got past Verna and Bueno and ended up in 3rd place, while Maluhy also got the better of Verna and then unsuccessfully tried to get past his countryman Bueno.

Behind these came the driver pairings of Leandro Carducci/Henry Martin and Rubén Salerno/Roberto Urretavizcaya, aboard VW Boras of the privateer Sportteam outfit, achieving a strong result for the team directed by Sergio Polze, with three cars in the first seven places. The first ten places were completed by Maximiliano Merlino/Sebastián Diruscio (Proas Motorsport) and Guillermo Valle/José Luis Di Palma (RV Competicion).

== Results ==
Position	Number	Driver	Car
1	8	(Argentina) Matías Rossi (Switzerland) Alain Menu	Chevrolet Astra
2	2	(Argentina) Martín Basso (Brazil) Hoover Orsi	Ford Focus
3	20	(Argentina) Fabián Flaqué (Argentina) Ernesto Bessone	Ford Focus
4	3	(Argentina) Emiliano Spataro (Brazil) Cacá Bueno	Volkswagen Bora
5	12	(Argentina) Lucas Benamo (Brazil) Felipe Maluhy	Renault Mégane
6	11	(Argentina) Guillermo Ortelli (Argentina) Rafael Verna	Renault Mégane
7	4	(Argentina) Leandro Carducci (Argentina) Henry Martin	Volkswagen Bora
8	43	(Argentina) Rubén Salerno (Argentina) Roberto Urretavizcaya	Volkswagen Bora
9	36	(Argentina) Maximiliano Merlino (Argentina) Sebastián Diruscio	Chrysler Neon
10	50	(Argentina) Roberto Valle (Argentina) Jose Luis Di Palma	Ford Focus
11	48	(Argentina) Gabriel Adamoli (Argentina) Federico Lifschitz	Volkswagen Polo
12	22	(Argentina) Mariano Altuna (Argentina) Sebastián Porto	Chevrolet Astra
13	5	(Argentina) Diego Aventín (Brazil) Tarso Marques	Honda Civic
14	32	(Argentina) Nicolás Kern (Argentina) Cesar Coggiola	Ford Focus
15	23	(Argentina) Ezequiel Bosio (Argentina) Ariel Pacho	Chevrolet Astra
16	21	(Argentina) Emanuel Moriatis (Argentina) Lionel Ugalde	Ford Focus
17	18	(Argentina) Mariano Bainotti (Argentina) Diego Menéndez	Honda Civic
18	9	(Argentina) Norberto Fontana (Brazil) Luciano Burti	Toyota Corolla
19	1	(Argentina) Gabriel Ponce de León (Brazil) David Muffato	Ford Focus
20	39	(Argentina) Carlos Okulovich (Brazil) Enrique Bernoldi	Honda Civic
21	14	(Argentina) Nelson García (Argentina) José Ciantini	Ford Focus
22	30	(Argentina) Lucas Armelini (Argentina) Walter Hernández	Chevrolet Astra
23	31	(Argentina) Jorge Trebbiani (Argentina) Nicolás Iglesias	Chevrolet Astra
24	10	(Argentina) Gabriel Furlán (Brazil) Christian Fittipaldi	Toyota Corolla
25	30	(Argentina) Crispín Beitía (Argentina) Luis José di Palma	Ford Focus
26	19	(Argentina) Franco Coscia (Argentina) Cantonati	Honda Civic
27	52	(Argentina) Daniel Belli (Argentina) Pedro Comito	Honda Civic
28	16	(Argentina) Oscar Fineschi (Argentina) Martín Ponte	Honda Civic
29	6	(Argentina) Juan Manuel Silva (United Kingdom) Anthony Reid	Honda Civic
30	49	(Argentina) Guillermo Castellanos (Argentina) Mariano Gonzalez Cono	Volkswagen Polo
31	38	(Argentina) Fabian Yannantuoni (Italy) Fabrizio Giovanardi	Honda Civic
32	40	(Argentina) Marcelo Bugliotti (United Kingdom) Robert Huff	Chevrolet Astra
33	7	(Argentina) Christian Ledesma (Italy) Nicola Larini	Chevrolet Astra
34	27	(Argentina) Rafael Moro (Argentina) Gabriel Suarez	Honda Civic
35	28	(Argentina) Gustavo Der Ohanessian (Argentina) Omar El Bacha	Fiat Stilo
