= 2017 Buenos Aires 200km =

Touring car race

Autódromo Juan y Óscar Gálvez No 15

The 2017 200 km of Buenos Aires was the eighth edition of this race in the TC2000 season. The race was held in the Autódromo Juan y Óscar Gálvez in Buenos Aires.

== Race results ==
Pos	No	Team	Drivers	Chassis	Tyre	Laps
Pos	No	Team	Drivers	Engine	Tyre	Laps
1	22	Renault Sport	(Argentina) Emiliano Spataro (Argentina) Christian Ledesma	Renault Fluence	P	26
1	22	Renault Sport	(Argentina) Emiliano Spataro (Argentina) Christian Ledesma	Radical V8	P	26
2	34	Escuderia Fela	(Argentina) Juan Ángel Rosso (Argentina) Sebastián Peluso	Ford Focus	P	26
2	34	Escuderia Fela	(Argentina) Juan Ángel Rosso (Argentina) Sebastián Peluso	Radical V8	P	26
3	2	YPF Chevrolet	(Argentina) Bernardo Llaver (Uruguay) Santiago Urrutia	Chevrolet Cruze	P	26
3	2	YPF Chevrolet	(Argentina) Bernardo Llaver (Uruguay) Santiago Urrutia	Radical V8	P	26
4	79	Team Peugeot Total Argentina	(Argentina) Facundo Chapur (Argentina) Franco Girolami	Peugeot 408	P	26
4	79	Team Peugeot Total Argentina	(Argentina) Facundo Chapur (Argentina) Franco Girolami	Radical V8	P	26
5	36	Escuderia Fela	(Argentina) Damian Fineschi (Argentina) Juan Manuel Silva	Ford Focus	P	26
5	36	Escuderia Fela	(Argentina) Damian Fineschi (Argentina) Juan Manuel Silva	Radical V8	P	26
6	8	Citroen Total Racing	(Argentina) Martin Moggia (Argentina) Humberto Krujoski	Citroen C4 Lounge	P	26
6	8	Citroen Total Racing	(Argentina) Martin Moggia (Argentina) Humberto Krujoski	Radical V8	P	26
7	10	YPF Chevrolet	(Argentina) Manuel Mallo (Argentina) Matías Russo	Chevrolet Cruze	P	26
7	10	YPF Chevrolet	(Argentina) Manuel Mallo (Argentina) Matías Russo	Radical V8	P	26
8	16	Toyota Gazoo Racing Argentina	(Argentina) Gabriel Ponce de León (Argentina) Norberto Fontana	Toyota Corolla	P	26
8	16	Toyota Gazoo Racing Argentina	(Argentina) Gabriel Ponce de León (Argentina) Norberto Fontana	Radical V8	P	26
9	3	Renault Sport	(Argentina) Leonel Pernia (Argentina) Julian Santero	Renault Fluence	P	26
9	3	Renault Sport	(Argentina) Leonel Pernia (Argentina) Julian Santero	Radical V8	P	26
10	7	FIAT Petronas	(Argentina) Carlos Javier Merlo (Mexico) Ricardo Peréz de Lara	Fiat Linea	P	26
10	7	FIAT Petronas	(Argentina) Carlos Javier Merlo (Mexico) Ricardo Peréz de Lara	Radical V8	P	26
11	28	Toyota Gazoo Racing Argentina	(Argentina) Matías Milla (Argentina) Rafael Morgenstern	Toyota Corolla	P	26
11	28	Toyota Gazoo Racing Argentina	(Argentina) Matías Milla (Argentina) Rafael Morgenstern	Radical V8	P	26
12	13	Renault Sport	(Argentina) Luis José Di Palma (Brazil) Valdeno Brito	Renault Fluence	P	26
12	13	Renault Sport	(Argentina) Luis José Di Palma (Brazil) Valdeno Brito	Radical V8	P	26
13	1	YPF Chevrolet	(Argentina) Agustin Canapino (Argentina) Franco Vivian	Chevrolet Cruze	P	26
13	1	YPF Chevrolet	(Argentina) Agustin Canapino (Argentina) Franco Vivian	Radical V8	P	26
14	83	Renault Sport	(Argentina) Facundo Ardusso (Argentina) Ricardo Risatti	Renault Fluence	P	26
14	83	Renault Sport	(Argentina) Facundo Ardusso (Argentina) Ricardo Risatti	Radical V8	P	26
15	17	Toyota Gazoo Racing Argentina	(Argentina) Matias Rossi (Argentina) José María López	Toyota Corolla	P	26
15	17	Toyota Gazoo Racing Argentina	(Argentina) Matias Rossi (Argentina) José María López	Radical V8	P	26
16	44	Team Peugeot Total Argentina	(Argentina) Mariano Werner (Argentina) Mariano Altuna	Peugeot 408	P	26
16	44	Team Peugeot Total Argentina	(Argentina) Mariano Werner (Argentina) Mariano Altuna	Radical V8	P	26
17	6	FIAT Petronas	(Argentina) Emmanuel Cáceres (Argentina) Fabricio Pezzini	Fiat Linea	P	26
17	6	FIAT Petronas	(Argentina) Emmanuel Cáceres (Argentina) Fabricio Pezzini	Radical V8	P	26
18	15	Escuderia Fela	(Argentina) Luciano Farroni (Argentina) Camilo Echevarria	Ford Focus	P	25
18	15	Escuderia Fela	(Argentina) Luciano Farroni (Argentina) Camilo Echevarria	Radical V8	P	25
19	23	Team Peugeot Total Argentina	(Argentina) Matias Munoz Marchesi (Argentina) Matias Rodriguez	Peugeot 408	P	24
19	23	Team Peugeot Total Argentina	(Argentina) Matias Munoz Marchesi (Argentina) Matias Rodriguez	Radical V8	P	24
20	25	Citroen Total Racing	(Argentina) Esteban Guerrieri (Argentina) Marcelo Ciarrocchi	Citroen C4 Lounge	P	23
20	25	Citroen Total Racing	(Argentina) Esteban Guerrieri (Argentina) Marcelo Ciarrocchi	Radical V8	P	23
DNF	5	Team Peugeot Total Argentina	(Argentina) Fabian Yannantuoni (Argentina) Carlos Okulovich	Peugeot 408	P	21
DNF	5	Team Peugeot Total Argentina	(Argentina) Fabian Yannantuoni (Argentina) Carlos Okulovich	Radical V8	P	21
DNF	99	Escudería FE	(Argentina) Alessandro Salerno (Argentina) Bruno Armellini	Peugeot 408	P	20
DNF	99	Escudería FE	(Argentina) Alessandro Salerno (Argentina) Bruno Armellini	Radical V8	P	20
DNF	4	Renault Sport	(Argentina) Ignacio Julián (Argentina) Manuel Luque	Renault Fluence	P	19
DNF	4	Renault Sport	(Argentina) Ignacio Julián (Argentina) Manuel Luque	Radical V8	P	19
DNF	27	Toyota Gazoo Racing Argentina	(Argentina) Bruno Etman (Costa Rica) José Montalto	Toyota Corolla	P	15
DNF	27	Toyota Gazoo Racing Argentina	(Argentina) Bruno Etman (Costa Rica) José Montalto	Radical V8	P	15
DNF	11	RIVA Racing	(Argentina) Franco Riva (Argentina) Gabriel Gandulia	Ford Focus	P	14
DNF	11	RIVA Racing	(Argentina) Franco Riva (Argentina) Gabriel Gandulia	Radical V8	P	14
DNF	51	Citroen Total Racing	(Argentina) José Manuel Urcera (Brazil) Caca Bueno	Citroen C4 Lounge	P	8
DNF	51	Citroen Total Racing	(Argentina) José Manuel Urcera (Brazil) Caca Bueno	Radical V8	P	8
DNF	18	Escudería FE	(Argentina) Antonino García (Argentina) Gonzalo Fernandez	Peugeot 408	P	5
DNF	18	Escudería FE	(Argentina) Antonino García (Argentina) Gonzalo Fernandez	Radical V8	P	5
DNF	29	YPF Chevrolet	(Argentina) Facundo Conta (Argentina) Jonatan Castellano	Chevrolet Cruze	P	1
DNF	29	YPF Chevrolet	(Argentina) Facundo Conta (Argentina) Jonatan Castellano	Radical V8	P	1
