= 200 km de Buenos Aires =

TC2000 Championship
- Venue: Autódromo Juan y Oscar Gálvez
- First race: 2004
- First TC2000 race: 2004
- Last race: 2025
- Distance: 200 km
- Laps: 57
- Most wins (driver): (Argentina) Leonel Pernia (4)
- Most wins (manufacturer): Renault (6)

The 200 km de Buenos Aires is a 200-kilometre touring car race held annually mostly at Autódromo Juan y Óscar Gálvez in Buenos Aires, Argentina. The race is part of TC2000 Championship calendar and is usually held in October.

== Winners ==
Year	Winners	Car	Circuits/Layout	Results
2004	(Argentina) Gabriel Ponce de León (Argentina) Patricio Di Palma	Ford Focus	Autódromo Juan y Oscar Gálvez/Circuit N° 9	Results
2005	(Argentina) Diego Aventín (Brazil) Luciano Burti	Ford Focus	Autódromo Juan y Oscar Gálvez/Circuit N° 12	Results
2006	(Argentina) Matías Rossi (Switzerland) Alain Menu	Chevrolet Astra	Autódromo Juan y Oscar Gálvez/Circuit N° 12	Results
2007	(Argentina) Juan Manuel Silva (Argentina) Ezequiel Bosio	Honda Civic	Autódromo Juan y Oscar Gálvez/Circuit N° 9	Results
2008	(Argentina) José María López (United Kingdom) Anthony Reid	Honda Civic	Autódromo Juan y Oscar Gálvez/Circuit N° 9	Results
2009	(Argentina) Norberto Fontana (Brazil) Ricardo Mauricio	Toyota Corolla	Autódromo Juan y Oscar Gálvez/Circuit N° 12	Results
2010	(Argentina) Bernardo Llaver (Argentina) Mauro Giallombardo	Toyota Corolla	Autódromo Juan y Oscar Gálvez/Circuit N° 12	Results
2011	(Argentina) Mariano Werner (Argentina) Esteban Guerrieri	Toyota Corolla	Autódromo Roberto José Mouras	Results
2012–2013: Not held
2014	(Argentina) Néstor Girolami (Argentina) Mauro Giallombardo	Peugeot 408	Autódromo Juan y Oscar Gálvez/Circuit N° 8	Results
2015	(Argentina) Matías Rossi (Argentina) Gabriel Ponce de León	Toyota Corolla	Autódromo Provincia de La Pampa	Results
2016	(Argentina) Agustín Canapino (Argentina) Guillermo Ortelli	Chevrolet Cruze	Autódromo Juan y Oscar Gálvez/Circuit N° 9	Results
2017	(Argentina) Emiliano Spataro (Argentina) Christian Ledesma	Renault Fluence	Autódromo Juan y Oscar Gálvez/Circuit N° 15	Results
2018	(Argentina) Facundo Ardusso (Argentina) Mariano Altuna	Renault Fluence	Autódromo Juan y Oscar Gálvez/Circuit N° 15	Results
2019	(Argentina) Leonel Pernia (Argentina) Damián Fineschi	Renault Fluence	Autódromo Juan y Oscar Gálvez/Circuit N° 9	Results
2020: Not held
2021	(Argentina) Leonel Pernia (Argentina) Antonino García	Renault Fluence	Autódromo Juan y Oscar Gálvez/Circuit N° 9	Results
2022	(Argentina) Leonel Pernia (Argentina) Antonino García	Renault Fluence	Autódromo Juan y Oscar Gálvez/Circuit N° 9	Results
2023	(Argentina) Leonel Pernia (Argentina) Antonino García	Renault Fluence	Autódromo Juan y Oscar Gálvez/Circuit N° 8	Results
2024	(Argentina) Damián Fineschi (Argentina) Agustín Canapino	Chevrolet Cruze	Autódromo Juan y Oscar Gálvez/Circuit N° 9	Results
2025	(Argentina) Matías Rossi (Uruguay) Santiago Urrutia	Toyota Corolla Cross	Autódromo Juan y Oscar Gálvez/Circuit N° 8	Results

== Circuit and layouts used ==
Autódromo Juan y Oscar Gálvez/Circuit N° 9, used in 2004, 2007–2008, 2016, 2019, 2021–2022, 2024

Autódromo Juan y Oscar Gálvez/Circuit N° 12, used in 2005–2006, 2009–2010

Autódromo Roberto Mouras, used in 2011

Autódromo Juan y Oscar Gálvez/Circuit N° 8, used in 2014, 2023, 2025

Autódromo Provincia de La Pampa, used in 2015

Autódromo Juan y Oscar Gálvez/Circuit N° 15, used in 2017–2018
