= 2017 Súper TC2000 =

The 2017 Súper TC2000 season was the 6th season of this category, founded in 2012 and since that year was categorized as divisional major, compared to its pair TC2000.

The season was won by Facundo Ardusso.

== Teams and drivers ==
All drivers were registered in Argentina. Guest drivers for the 200 km de Buenos Aires are not included.

Team	Car	No.	Driver	Rounds
Equipo Chevrolet YPF-Pro Racing	Chevrolet Cruze	1	Agustín Canapino	All
Equipo Chevrolet YPF-Pro Racing	Chevrolet Cruze	2	Bernardo Llaver	All
Equipo Chevrolet YPF-Pro Racing	Chevrolet Cruze	10	Manuel Mallo	All
Equipo Chevrolet YPF-Pro Racing	Chevrolet Cruze	29	Facundo Conta	All
Renault Sport	Renault Fluence	3	Leonel Pernía	All
Renault Sport	Renault Fluence	4	Ignacio Julián	All
Renault Sport	Renault Fluence	9	Germán Sirvent	All
Renault Sport	Renault Fluence	13	Luis José Di Palma	All
Renault Sport	Renault Fluence	22	Emiliano Spataro	All
Renault Sport	Renault Fluence	83	Facundo Ardusso	All
Toyota Gazoo Racing Argentina	Toyota Corolla	16	Matías Rossi	All
Toyota Gazoo Racing Argentina	Toyota Corolla	17	Gabriel Ponce de León	All
Toyota Gazoo Racing Argentina	Toyota Corolla	27	Bruno Etman	All
Toyota Gazoo Racing Argentina	Toyota Corolla	28	Matías Milla	All
Team Peugeot Total Argentina	Peugeot 408	5	Fabián Yannantuoni	All
Team Peugeot Total Argentina	Peugeot 408	21	Matías Muñoz Marchesi	All
Team Peugeot Total Argentina	Peugeot 408	44	Mariano Werner	All
Team Peugeot Total Argentina	Peugeot 408	79	Facundo Chapur	All
Citroen Total Racing Super TC 2000 Team	Citroen C4 Lounge	8	Martín Moggia	All
Citroen Total Racing Super TC 2000 Team	Citroen C4 Lounge	25	Esteban Guerrieri	All
Citroen Total Racing Super TC 2000 Team	Citroen C4 Lounge	51	José Manuel Urcera	All
Fiat M&M Group	Fiat Linea	6	Emmanuel Cáceres	All
Fiat M&M Group	Fiat Linea	7	Carlos Javier Merlo	All
FE Peugeot Junior Equipe	Peugeot 408	18	Antonino García	5, 7–9
FE Peugeot Junior Equipe	Peugeot 408	23	Lucas Benamo	1-3
FE Peugeot Junior Equipe	Peugeot 408	32	Lucas Colombo Russell	1-3, 5–6
FE Peugeot Junior Equipe	Peugeot 408	41	Diego Javier Azar	1-2, 4, 6–9
FE Peugeot Junior Equipe	Peugeot 408	64	Bruno Armellini	11
FE Peugeot Junior Equipe	Peugeot 408	72	Lucas Armellini	12
FE Peugeot Junior Equipe	Peugeot 408	77	Mariano Pernía	9
FE Peugeot Junior Equipe	Peugeot 408	99	Alessandro Salerno	3, 5–12
Escudería Fela by RAM	Ford Focus	15	Luciano Farroni	All
Escudería Fela by RAM	Ford Focus	34	Juan Ángel Rosso	All
Escudería Fela by RAM	Ford Focus	36	Damián Fineschi	All
Riva Racing	Ford Focus	11	Franco Riva	6-9, 11–12
Riva Racing	Ford Focus	33	Gustavo Micheloud	1-2, 4–5
JM Motorsport	Chevrolet Cruze	95	Javier Manta	1-2, 4, 6–9

== Race calendar and results ==
All races are scheduled to be held in Argentina.

Round		Circuit	Date	Winning driver	Winning team
1	S	Autódromo Juan y Óscar Gálvez, Buenos Aires	25 March	José Manuel Urcera	Citroen Total Racing Super TC 2000 Team
1	R	Autódromo Juan y Óscar Gálvez, Buenos Aires	26 March	José Manuel Urcera	Citroen Total Racing Super TC 2000 Team
2	S	Circuito de Potrero de los Funes, San Luis	22 April	Gabriel Ponce de León	Toyota Gazoo Racing Argentina
2	R	Circuito de Potrero de los Funes, San Luis	23 April	Facundo Chapur	Team Peugeot Total Argentina
3	S	Autódromo Jorge Ángel Pena, San Martín	6 May	Fabián Yannantuoni	Team Peugeot Total Argentina
3	R	Autódromo Jorge Ángel Pena, San Martín	7 May	Fabián Yannantuoni	Team Peugeot Total Argentina
4	R1	Autódromo Juan Manuel Fangio, Rosario	20 May	Facundo Ardusso	Renault Sportteam
4	R2	Autódromo Juan Manuel Fangio, Rosario	21 May	Agustín Canapino	Equipo Chevrolet YPF-Pro Racing
5	S	Autódromo Termas de Río Hondo, Santiago del Estero	10 June	Agustín Canapino	Equipo Chevrolet YPF-Pro Racing
5	R	Autódromo Termas de Río Hondo, Santiago del Estero	11 June	Esteban Guerrieri	Citroen Total Racing Super TC 2000 Team
6	S	Autódromo Ciudad de Rafaela, Rafaela	1 July	Mariano Werner	Team Peugeot Total Argentina
6	R	Autódromo Ciudad de Rafaela, Rafaela	2 July	Emiliano Spataro	Renault Sportteam
7	S	Oberá, Oberá, Misiones	29 July	Leonel Pernía	Renault Sport
7	R	Oberá, Oberá, Misiones	30 July	Leonel Pernía	Renault Sport
8	R1	Gran Premio de Santa Fe, Streets of Santa Fe	2 September	Facundo Ardusso	Renault Sportteam
8	R2	Gran Premio de Santa Fe, Streets of Santa Fe	3 September	Facundo Ardusso	Renault Sportteam
9		200 km de Buenos Aires, Autódromo Juan y Óscar Gálvez, Buenos Aires	1 October	Emiliano Spataro; Christian Ledesma	Renault Sportteam
10	S	Autódromo Eduardo Copello, San Juan	4 November	Damián Fineschi	Escudería Fela by RAM
10	R	Autódromo Eduardo Copello, San Juan	5 November	Mariano Werner	Team Peugeot Total Argentina
11	S	Autódromo Parque Ciudad, General Roca	25 November	Matías Rossi	Toyota Gazoo Racing Argentina
11	R	Autódromo Parque Ciudad, General Roca	26 November	Matías Rossi	Toyota Gazoo Racing Argentina
12		Autódromo Oscar Cabalén, Alta Gracia	17 December	Agustín Canapino	Equipo Chevrolet YPF-Pro Racing

=== Championship standings ===
Points system

Drivers' championship

Pos.	Driver	BUE (Buenos Aires)	PDF (San Luis Province)	SMM (Mendoza Province)	ROS (Santa Fe Province)		TRH (Santiago del Estero Province)	RAF (Santa Fe Province)	OBE (Misiones Province)	SFE (Santa Fe Province)		BUE (Buenos Aires)	SJU (San Juan Province, Argentina)	RNE (Río Negro Province)	CBA (Córdoba Province, Argentina)	Points
1	(Argentina) Facundo Ardusso	6	3	Ret	1	2	Ret	6	3	1	1	14	2	4	2	226
2	(Argentina) Agustín Canapino	Ret	2	3	4	1	DSQ	Ret	6	3	Ret	13	8	2	1	191
3	(Argentina) Mariano Werner	5	7	2	2	20	5	8	4	9	4	16	1	Ret	4	180
4	(Argentina) Matías Rossi	3	6	Ret	3	3	7	2	22	2	Ret	15	6	1	16	152
5	(Argentina) Damián Fineschi	8	5	21†	5	4	Ret	24†	7	Ret	DNS	5	4	3	7	142,5
6	(Argentina) Leonel Pernía	2	11	10	20	5	20	5	1	Ret	2	9	3	16†	19	139
7	(Argentina) Emiliano Spataro	4	14	5	11	10	4	1	10	14	17	1	12	12	17	136,5
8	(Argentina) Facundo Chapur	24†	1	6	Ret	7	18	3	5	DSQ	5	4	10	Ret	10	133,5
9	(Argentina) Bernardo Llaver	Ret	8	7	6	18	2	15	2	21†	3	3	9	Ret	14	130,5
10	(Argentina) Matías Muñoz Marchesi	12	DSQ	9	7	14	14	7	8	5	13	19	5	5	5	101,5
11	(Argentina) Esteban Guerrieri	19	13	11	Ret	Ret	1	9	Ret	4	DSQ	20†	7	Ret	3	96,5
12	(Argentina) José Manuel Urcera	1	12	16	10	22	3	4	14	DNS	Ret	Ret	DSQ	9	25	83,5
13	(Argentina) Fabián Yannantuoni	Ret	10	1	8	Ret	6	25†	DSQ	Ret	12	21†	Ret	11	8	78
14	(Argentina) Martín Moggia	Ret	16	4	13	Ret	8	19†	12	12	10	6	14	Ret	20	64,5
15	(Argentina) Manuel Mallo	20	Ret	8	12	DSQ	17	11	Ret	10	16	7	13	8	9	63
16	(Argentina) Ignacio Julián	7	Ret	14	DSQ	Ret	19	16	9	8	7	Ret	19†	6	11	56
17	(Argentina) Gabriel Ponce de León	9	4	15	19	15	21	13	Ret	19†	DNS	8	Ret	DNS	13	52,5
18	(Argentina) Facundo Conta	15	21	20	21	17	23†	10	11	11	Ret	Ret	Ret	7	6	44,5
19	(Argentina) Juan Ángel Rosso	21	22†	19	16	21†	15	Ret	15	16	Ret	2	11	13	26	44
20	(Argentina) Matías Milla	11	Ret	24†	9	8	10	23†	21†	17†	6	11	18†	Ret	Ret	44
21	(Argentina) Luis José Di Palma	13	9	12	14	9	Ret	Ret	17	6	Ret	12	16	DSQ	15	40
22	(Argentina) Luciano Farroni	10	Ret	13	Ret	12	9	14	16	7	9	18	15	Ret	24	37,5
23	(Argentina) Carlos Merlo	Ret	18	Ret	Ret	11	11	26	23	Ret	11	10	20†	Ret	18	25
24	(Argentina) Bruno Etman	16	20	22	Ret	6	DSQ	22	19	18†	Ret	Ret	Ret	14	12	19
25	(Argentina) Antonino García						12		20	15	8	Ret				12
26	(Argentina) Emmanuel Cáceres	17	15	23	18	16	Ret	17	13	20†	Ret	17	Ret	10	21	10
27	(Argentina) Lucas Colombo Russell	14	Ret	17			16	12								6
28	(Argentina) Germán Sirvent	18	19	18	15	13	13	Ret	Ret							6
29	(Argentina) Alessandro Salerno			Ret			22†	21	18	13	14	22†	Ret	15	22	5
30	(Argentina) Franco Riva							Ret	DSQ	Ret	15	Ret		Ret	Ret	0,5
NC	(Argentina) Javier Manta	23†	Ret		17	Ret		18	Ret	Ret	Ret	DSQ				0
NC	(Argentina) Gustavo Micheloud	Ret	17		Ret	19	Ret									0
NC	(Argentina) Lucas Benamo	22	Ret	DSQ												0
NC	(Argentina) Diego Azar	Ret	DNS													0
NC	(Argentina) Mariano Pernía											DSQ				0
Guest drivers ineligible for points
NC	(Argentina) Gonzalo Fernández												17†			-
NC	(Argentina) Bruno Armellini													17†		-
NC	(Argentina) Lucas Armellini														23	-
Pos.	Driver	BUE (Buenos Aires)	PDF (San Luis Province)	SMM (Mendoza Province)	ROS (Santa Fe Province)		TRH (Santiago del Estero Province)	RAF (Santa Fe Province)	OBE (Misiones Province)	SFE (Santa Fe Province)		BUE (Buenos Aires)	SJU (San Juan Province, Argentina)	RNE (Río Negro Province)	CBA (Córdoba Province, Argentina)	Points

Teams' championship

Pos	Team	Points
1	Renault Sport	488.5
2	Team Peugeot Total Argentina	405.5
3	Chevrolet YPF Pro Racing	376
4	Toyota Gazoo Racing Argentina	253.5
5	Citroën Total Racing Súper TC 2000 Team	236.5
6	Escudería Fela by RAM	223
7	Fiat Petronas	35
8	Escudería FE	23
9	Riva Racing	0.5
10	JM Motorsport	0

Manufacturers' championship

Pos	Manufacturer	Points
1	Chevrolet	320.5
2	Peugeot	313.5
3	Renault	275.5
4	Toyota	206.5
5	Ford	181.5
6	Citroën	145
7	Fiat	35
