= 2004 Buenos Aires 200km =

Autódromo Juan y Óscar Gálvez No 9

The 2004 200 km of Buenos Aires is the first edition of this race on the TC2000 season. The race was held in the Autódromo Juan y Óscar Gálvez in Buenos Aires.

== Results ==
Position	Number	Driver	Car
1	1	(Argentina) Gabriel Ponce de León (Argentina) Patricio Di Palma	Ford Focus
2	9	(Argentina) Christian Ledesma (Switzerland) Alain Menu	Chevrolet Astra
3	10	(Argentina) Marcelo Bugliotti (Brazil) David Muffato	Volkswagen Bora
4	16	(Argentina) Luis Belloso (Argentina) Jose Luis Di Palma	Renault Mégane
5	15	(Argentina) Crispin Beitia (Argentina) Ernesto Bessone	Ford Focus
6	5	(Argentina) Martín Basso (United Kingdom) Anthony Reid	Honda Civic
7	20	(Argentina) Gabriel Adamoli (Argentina) Emanuel Moriatis	Volkswagen Polo
8	18	(Argentina) Emiliano Spataro (Argentina) Rafael Moro	Chevrolet Astra
9	40	(Chile) Eliseo Salazar (Chile) Julio Infante	Renault Mégane
10	12	(Argentina) Leandro Carducci (Colombia) Jaime Mor	Honda Civic
11	34	(Argentina) Nicolas Kern (Argentina) Pablo Redolfi	Ford Focus
12	44	(Argentina) Mariano Bainotti (Argentina) Gabriel Suarez	Honda Civic
13	17	(Argentina) Juan Pablo Satorra (Argentina) Moreiro	Renault Mégane
14	21	(Argentina) Roberto Urretavizcaya (Argentina) Laureano Campanera	Volkswagen Bora
15	19	(Argentina) Federico Lifschitz (Argentina) Juan Pablo Rossotti	Chevrolet Astra
16	27	(Argentina) Julián Crespo (Argentina) Gastón Caserta	Ford Focus
17	24	(Argentina) Fabian Yannantuoni (Brazil) Cacá Bueno	Honda Civic
18	6	(Argentina) Juan Manuel Silva (Sweden) Rickard Rydell	Honda Civic
19	52	(Argentina) Leonel Larrauri (Argentina) Oscar Larrauri	Ford Focus
20	32	(Argentina) Gustavo Der Ohanessian (Argentina) Daniel Belli	Fiat Stilo
21	43	(Argentina) Fabricio Pezzini (Argentina) Ariel Pacho	Honda Civic
22	28	(Argentina) Guillermo Ortelli (Argentina) Matías Rossi	Peugeot 307
23	4	(Argentina) Nicolás Vuyovich (Argentina) Baldinelli	Toyota Corolla
24	14	(Argentina) Nelson Garcia (Argentina) Fabian Flaque	Ford Focus
25	11	(Argentina) Oscar Fineschi (Argentina) Lorca	Honda Civic
26	29	(Argentina) Carlos Okulovich (Argentina) Henry Martin	Peugeot 307
27	30	(Argentina) Esteban Tuero (Spain) Jordi Gené	Volkswagen Polo
28	3	(Argentina) Norberto Fontana (United Kingdom) Kelvin Burt	Toyota Corolla
29	38	(Argentina) Anibal Zaniratto (Argentina) Mariano Altuna	Peugeot 307
30	8	(Argentina) Gabriel Furlán (Brazil) Flavio Figueiredo	Mitsubishi Lancer
31	42	(Argentina) Ezequiel Toia (Argentina) Pedro Comito	Honda Civic
