= 2008 Buenos Aires 200km =

Autódromo Juan y Óscar Gálvez No 9

The 2008 200 km of Buenos Aires was the second edition of this race on the TC2000 season. The race was held in the Autódromo Juan y Óscar Gálvez in Buenos Aires Augusta 10, 2008.

== Report ==
With more than 70,000 spectators attending the event, Argentina's José María López and Scotland's Anthony Reid won the 5th edition of the Buenos Aires 200 km. Another of the New Civic of the Honda Petrobras cars won second, in the hands of Juan Manuel Silva/Leonel Ugalde. Alain Menu/Christian Ledesma (Chevrolet Elaion) completed the podium.

“This is a dream come true. It is the happiest day of my life. Tears came to my eyes because of all the work we did to achieve this result. It is Honda's victory. It is the team's victory. I suffered very much when I was not at the wheel of the car, it is very different. There were times in which I wanted him to go faster, to take it easier, but I did not want to influence what Anthony was doing at the wheel of the car. We formed a great driver pairing, sincerely", said López, full of emotion.

Pechito recently won on the Santa Fe street circuit.

This was Anthony Reid's first victory in the division. He competed in all five editions. He was second in the previous year's event, co-driving with Brazil's Carlos Bueno. "I've spent five years trying to win this race. Last year we were second. We've raced with Víctor Rosso in Japan, I know him very well and to be here is terrific. I also want to thank López for the great job he did today ... he should be in Formula 1." said the Scot.

Felipe Maluhy's Renault Mégane was co-driving with standings leader Guillermo Ortelli. Maluhy finished 5th in the 2006 edition and 4th in 2007. In this race, he was nerfed by his countryman Cacá Bueno in the Ombú Curve. He was demoted to fifth, as he was overtaken by Bueno and also by Alain Menú, who was co-driving a Chevrolet Astra with Christian Ledesma.

Once the race ended, the Stewards handed out a 30-second penalty to Bueno and this relegated him to 10th, so the third step of the podium finally corresponded to Ledesma/Menú, while Ortelli/Maluhy ended up fourth, ahead of Matías Rossi/Thiago Camilo.

In this way, Switzerland's Alain Menú once again claimed a podium placing in the event, as he had done in his three previous outings in the Buenos Aires 200 km. He and Ledesma were the best-placed Chevrolet drivers. Teammates Bugliotti/Huff were sixth and Risatti/Orsi seventh.

Ford YPF’s Martín Basso retired early on in the race while in fourth. Omar Martinez did not get to race the Focus. The Gabriel Ponce de León/Walter Hernández pairing ended up 12th after engine trouble delayed them.

== Results ==
| Position | Number | Driver | Car |
|---|---|---|---|
| 1 | 37 | (Argentina) José María López (United Kingdom) Anthony Reid | Honda Civic |
| 2 | 9 | (Argentina) Juan Manuel Silva (Argentina) Lionel Ugalde | Honda Civic |
| 3 | 5 | (Argentina) Christian Ledesma (Switzerland) Alain Menu | Chevrolet Astra |
| 4 | 41 | (Argentina) Guillermo Ortelli (Brazil) Felipe Maluhy | Renault Megane |
| 5 | 2 | (Argentina) Matías Rossi (Brazil) Thiago Camilo | Renault Megane |
| 6 | 6 | (Argentina) Marcelo Bugliotti (United Kingdom) Robert Huff | Chevrolet Astra |
| 7 | 39 | (Argentina) Ricardo Risatti (Brazil) Hoover Orsi | Chevrolet Astra |
| 8 | 36 | (Argentina) Mariano Werner (Brazil) Ricardo Mauricio | Ford Focus |
| 9 | 25 | (Argentina) Franco Coscia (Argentina) Lucas Armellini | Honda Civic |
| 10 | 24 | (Argentina) Carlos Okulovich (Brazil) Cacá Bueno | Honda Civic |
| 11 | 61 | (Argentina) Damian Fineschi (Argentina) Franco Berardi | Honda Civic |
| 12 | 15 | (Argentina) Gabriel Ponce de León (Argentina) Walter Hernández | Ford Focus |
| 13 | 17 | (Argentina) Luis Belloso (Argentina) Omar Martinez | Renault Megane |
| 14 | 26 | (Argentina) Gustavo Der Ohanessian (Argentina) Leonel Larrauri | Ford Focus |
| 15 | 40 | (Argentina) Nestor Riva (Argentina) Omar El Bacha | Volkswagen Polo |
| 16 | 17 | (Argentina) Fabian Yannantuoni (Argentina) Néstor Girolami | Chevrolet Astra |
| 17 | 39 | (Argentina) Lucas Benamo (Argentina) Ernesto Bessone | Honda Civic |
| 18 | 41 | (Argentina) Bernardo Llaver (Argentina) Gabriel Furlán | Honda Civic |
