= 2022 TC2000 Championship =

44th season of Turismo Competición 2000

The 2022 TC2000 Championship was the 44th season of Turismo Competición 2000, the premier touring car category of Argentina. It was the first season following its reversion to the TC2000 moniker after ten years as Súper TC2000.

== Calendar ==
Round	Circuit	Date	Map
1	(Santa Fe Province) Autódromo Municipal Juan Manuel Fangio, Rosario	March 13	2022 TC2000 Championship is located in Argentina
2	(Buenos Aires Province) Autódromo Ezequiel Crisol, Bahía Blanca	April 10	2022 TC2000 Championship is located in Argentina
3	(Entre Ríos Province) Autodrómo Ciudad de Concordia, Concordia	May 1	2022 TC2000 Championship is located in Argentina
4	(Neuquén Province) Autódromo Parque Provincia del Neuquén, Centenario	May 22	2022 TC2000 Championship is located in Argentina
5	(Santiago del Estero Province) Autódromo Termas de Río Hondo, Termas de Río Hondo	June 12	2022 TC2000 Championship is located in Argentina
6	(Córdoba Province, Argentina) Autódromo Oscar Cabalén, Alta Gracia	July 3	2022 TC2000 Championship is located in Argentina
7	(Santa Fe Province) Autódromo Ciudad de Rafaela, Rafaela	July 24	2022 TC2000 Championship is located in Argentina
8	(Buenos Aires Province) Autódromo Juan María Traverso, San Nicolás	August 14	2022 TC2000 Championship is located in Argentina
9	(San Juan Province, Argentina) Autódromo San Juan Villicum, Albardón	September 11	2022 TC2000 Championship is located in Argentina
10	Autódromo Oscar y Juan Gálvez, Buenos Aires	October 2	2022 TC2000 Championship is located in Argentina
11	(Córdoba Province, Argentina) Autódromo Oscar Cabalén, Alta Gracia	October 23	2022 TC2000 Championship is located in Argentina
12	(Entre Ríos Province) Autódromo de Concepción del Uruguay, Concepción del Uruguay	November 13	2022 TC2000 Championship is located in Argentina

== Teams and drivers ==
Manufacturer	Car	Entrant (Commercial title)	#	Driver	Rounds	Co-driver (200 km)
Chevrolet	Cruze J400	Pro Racing (Chevrolet YPF)	1	(Argentina) Agustín Canapino	1–10, 12	(Argentina) Christian Ledesma
Chevrolet	Cruze J400	Pro Racing (Chevrolet YPF)	10	(Argentina) Bernardo Llaver	1–10, 12	(Uruguay) Santiago Urrutia
Chevrolet	Cruze J400	FR Motorsport	55	(Uruguay) Gonzalo Reilly	2	—N/a
Chevrolet	Cruze J400	FR Motorsport	78	(Argentina) Franco Riva	3–5, 9	(Argentina) Leonel Sotra
Chevrolet	Cruze J400	JM Motorsport	67	(Argentina) Nicolás Traut	1–4, 7–12	(Argentina) Figgo Bessone
Citroën	C4 Mk.3	Belloso Competición	42	(Argentina) Javier Scuncio Moro	12	—N/a
Citroën	C4 Mk.3	Belloso Competición	49	(Uruguay) Rodrigo Aramendía	10–11	(Argentina) Javier Scuncio Moro
Citroën	C4 Mk.3	Belloso Competición	66	(Paraguay) Miguel García Garcia	10	(Uruguay) Cyro Fontes
Citroën	C4 Mk.3	Equipo FDC	57	(Argentina) Franco Vivian	1–4, 7–12	(Argentina) Ricardo Risatti III
Fiat	Cronos	FS Motorsport	15	(Argentina) Camilo Echevarría	4	—N/a
Fiat	Cronos	FS Motorsport	29	(Argentina) Facundo Aldrighetti	11–12	—N/a
Fiat	Cronos	FS Motorsport	47	(Peru) Rodrigo Pflucker	6–7	—N/a
Fiat	Cronos	FS Motorsport	51	(Argentina) Exequiel Bastidas	2–8	—N/a
Fiat	Cronos	FS Motorsport	55	(Uruguay) Gonzalo Reilly	1, 3–10	(Argentina) Lucas Colombo Russell
Fiat	Cronos	FS Motorsport	56	(Argentina) Baltazar Leguizamón	1	—N/a
Fiat	Cronos	FS Motorsport	65	(Argentina) Emiliano Spataro	5, 9–12	(Argentina) Norberto Fontana
Fiat	Cronos	FS Motorsport	77	(Argentina) Mariano Pernía	2	—N/a
Honda	Civic Mk.10	RAM Racing Factory (Puma Energy Honda Racing)	5	(Argentina) Fabián Yannantuoni	All	(Argentina) Matías Muñoz Marchesi
Honda	Civic Mk.10	RAM Racing Factory (Puma Energy Honda Racing)	24	(Argentina) Matías Cravero	All	(Argentina) Juan José Garriz
Honda	Civic Mk.10	RAM Racing Factory (Puma Energy Honda Racing)	83	(Argentina) Facundo Ardusso	All	(Argentina) Carlos Javier Merlo
Renault	Fluence	Ambrogio Racing (Axion Energy Sport)	3	(Argentina) Leonel Pernía	All	(Argentina) Antonino García
Renault	Fluence	Ambrogio Racing (Axion Energy Sport)	8	(Argentina) Matías Milla	All	(Uruguay) Juan Manuel Casella
Renault	Fluence	Ambrogio Racing (Axion Energy Sport)	17	(Chile) Felipe Barrios Bustos	All	(Argentina) Facundo Marques
Renault	Fluence	Ambrogio Racing (Axion Energy Sport)	23	(Argentina) Ignacio Montenegro	All	(Argentina) Gastón Iansa
Toyota	Corolla E210	Toyota Gazoo Racing Argentina (Toyota Gazoo Racing YPF Infinia) (Note: Cars #41 and #68 entered under the commercial title Toyota Gazoo Racing YPF Infinia.) (Toyota Gazoo Racing Junior) (Note: Cars #29, #53, #55 and #61 entered under the commercial title Toyota Gazoo Racing Junior.)	29	(Argentina) Facundo Aldrighetti	1–10	(Uruguay) Marcelo Ciarrochi
Toyota	Corolla E210	Toyota Gazoo Racing Argentina (Toyota Gazoo Racing YPF Infinia) (Toyota Gazoo Racing Junior)	41	(Argentina) Jorge Barrio	All	(Argentina) Damián Fineschi
Toyota	Corolla E210	Toyota Gazoo Racing Argentina (Toyota Gazoo Racing YPF Infinia) (Toyota Gazoo Racing Junior)	53	(Argentina) Eugenio Provens	1–10	(Argentina) Ever Franetovich
Toyota	Corolla E210	Toyota Gazoo Racing Argentina (Toyota Gazoo Racing YPF Infinia) (Toyota Gazoo Racing Junior)	55	(Uruguay) Gonzalo Reilly	11–12	—N/a
Toyota	Corolla E210	Toyota Gazoo Racing Argentina (Toyota Gazoo Racing YPF Infinia) (Toyota Gazoo Racing Junior)	61	(Argentina) Lucas Bohdanowicz	11–12	—N/a
Toyota	Corolla E210	Toyota Gazoo Racing Argentina (Toyota Gazoo Racing YPF Infinia) (Toyota Gazoo Racing Junior)	68	(Argentina) Julián Santero	All	(Argentina) Matías Rossi

== Results and standings ==
=== Results summary ===
Round			Pole position	Fastest lap	Winning driver	Winning team
1	R1	Rosario	(Argentina) Agustín Canapino	(Argentina) Agustín Canapino	(Argentina) Julián Santero	Toyota Gazoo Racing Argentina
1	R2	Rosario		(Argentina) Agustín Canapino	(Argentina) Leonel Pernía	Axion Energy Sport
2	R1	Bahía Blanca	(Argentina) Leonel Pernía	(Argentina) Agustín Canapino	(Argentina) Agustín Canapino	Chevrolet YPF
2	R2	Bahía Blanca		(Argentina) Agustín Canapino	(Argentina) Agustín Canapino	Chevrolet YPF
3	R1	Concordia	(Argentina) Agustín Canapino	(Argentina) Bernardo Llaver	(Argentina) Julián Santero	Toyota Gazoo Racing Argentina
3	R2	Concordia		(Argentina) Bernardo Llaver	(Argentina) Agustín Canapino	Axion Energy Sport
4	R1	Neuquén	(Argentina) Ignacio Montenegro	(Argentina) Bernardo Llaver	(Argentina) Jorge Barrio	Toyota Gazoo Racing Argentina
4	R2	Neuquén		(Argentina) Jorge Barrio	(Argentina) Bernardo Llaver	Chevrolet YPF
5	R1	Termas de Río Hondo	(Argentina) Leonel Pernía	(Argentina) Fabián Yannantuoni	(Argentina) Fabián Yannantuoni	Puma Energy Honda Racing
5	R2	Termas de Río Hondo		(Argentina) Leonel Pernía	(Argentina) Leonel Pernía	Axion Energy Sport
6	R1	Córdoba	(Argentina) Bernardo Llaver	(Argentina) Facundo Ardusso	(Argentina) Facundo Ardusso	Puma Energy Honda Racing
6	R2	Córdoba		(Argentina) Bernardo Llaver	(Argentina) Bernardo Llaver	Chevrolet YPF
7	R1	Rafaela	(Argentina) Matías Milla	(Argentina) Agustín Canapino	(Argentina) Leonel Pernía	Axion Energy Sport
7	R2	Rafaela		(Argentina) Matías Cravero	(Argentina) Facundo Ardusso	Puma Energy Honda Racing
8	R1	San Nicolás	(Argentina) Ignacio Montenegro	(Argentina) Leonel Pernía	(Argentina) Leonel Pernía	Axion Energy Sport
8	R2	San Nicolás		(Argentina) Ignacio Montenegro	(Argentina) Ignacio Montenegro	Axion Energy Sport
9	R1	Albardón	(Argentina) Agustín Canapino	(Argentina) Agustín Canapino	(Argentina) Julián Santero	Toyota Gazoo Racing Argentina
9	R2	Albardón		(Argentina) Agustín Canapino	(Argentina) Jorge Barrio	Toyota Gazoo Racing Argentina
10	R	Buenos Aires	(Argentina) Leonel Pernía (Argentina) Antonino García	(Argentina) Leonel Pernía	(Argentina) Leonel Pernía (Argentina) Antonino García	Axion Energy Sport
11	R1	Alta Gracia	(Chile) Felipe Barrios Bustos	(Argentina) Julián Santero	(Argentina) Matías Cravero	Puma Energy Honda Racing
11	R2	Alta Gracia		(Argentina) Matías Milla	(Argentina) Matías Milla	Axion Energy Sport
12	R	Concepción del Uruguay	(Argentina) Agustín Canapino	(Argentina) Leonel Pernía	(Argentina) Julián Santero	Toyota Gazoo Racing Argentina

=== Championship standings ===
Points system

Position	1st	2nd	3rd	4th	5th	6th	7th	8th	9th	10th
Qualifying	3	2	1							
Race 1	15	12	10	8	6	5	4	3	2	1
Race 2	30	24	18	15	12	9	6	4	3	1
Race	40	32	26	20	15	10	7	4	2	1

Drivers' championship

Pos.	Driver	ROS (Santa Fe Province)		BHB (Buenos Aires Province)		CCD (Entre Ríos Province)		NEU (Neuquén Province)		TRH (Santiago del Estero Province)		AGC (Córdoba Province, Argentina)		RAF (Santa Fe Province)		SNI (Buenos Aires Province)		ALB (San Juan Province, Argentina)		BUA (Buenos Aires)	AGC (Córdoba Province, Argentina)		CDU (Entre Ríos Province)	Points
1	(Argentina) Leonel Pernía	4	1	7	4	17	8	7	3	4	1	6	3	1	4	1	5	4	3	1	5	2	3	314
2	(Argentina) Julián Santero	1	2	3	3	1	4	Ret	8	5	4	3	5	Ret	2	15	9	1	5	2	3	Ret	1	279
3	(Argentina) Agustín Canapino	Ret	Ret	1	1	9	1	8	4	2	2	DSQ	DSQ	5	Ret	Ret	2	2	2	13			2	243
4	(Argentina) Bernardo Llaver	DSQ	3	8	2	4	2	5	1	13	9	4	1	6	6	3	4	6	10	3			9	226
5	(Argentina) Jorge Barrio	12	5	4	5	3	Ret	1	11	11	6	7	2	8	11	5	3	5	1	4	6	4	5	217
6	(Argentina) Ignacio Montenegro	7	8	10	6	2	12	2	10	7	7	5	4	7	3	7	1	9	4	5	8	3	6	198
7	(Argentina) Matías Milla	6	9	9	13	5	3	6	2	6	3	2	6	9	5	4	6	15	6	7	10	1	7	186
8	(Argentina) Facundo Ardusso	2	4	6	Ret	7	6	3	13	3	Ret	1	11	4	1	2	Ret	7	7	Ret	7	Ret	15	145
9	(Argentina) Franco Vivian	5	7	2	Ret	6	5	4	15					2	7	6	7	3	8	6	4	7	8	123
10	(Argentina) Fabián Yannantuoni	3	6	5	8	8	DSQ	10	5	1	5	12	8	11	13	9	8	12	Ret	8	9	11	Ret	85
11	(Argentina) Matías Cravero	13	11	11	12	18	9	Ret	6	8	8	Ret	Ret	3	8	8	11	10	Ret	10	1	5	14	62
12	(Argentina) Facundo Aldrighetti	10	Ret	Ret	9	15	13	9	7	10	12	13	Ret	12	Ret	16	12	13	9	Ret	12	6	4	48
13	(Chile) Felipe Barrios Bustos	9	12	12	10	10	Ret	13	14	9	13	8	9	15	12	DSQ	15	8	Ret	Ret	2	9	13	30
14	(Argentina) Eugenio Provens	8	10	Ret	11	13	Ret	11	17	Ret	11	9	7	13	Ret	11	13	11	Ret	9				14
15	(Argentina) Exequiel Bastidas			14	Ret	12	7	15	12	Ret	10	10	Ret	10	9	10	16							13
16	(Argentina) Mariano Pernía			15	7																			6
17	(Uruguay) Gonzalo Reilly	11	Ret	13	Ret	14	11	Ret	Ret	12	14	14	10	Ret	10	14	10	14	11	11	13	Ret	11	4
18	(Argentina) Emiliano Spataro									Ret	15					12	Ret			12	Ret	8	Ret	4
19	(Argentina) Franco Riva					11	10	12	9	Ret	Ret													1
20	(Argentina) Nicolás Traut	Ret	Ret	16	Ret	16	Ret	16	16					14	Ret	13	14	Ret	12	Ret	15	13	12	0
21	(Peru) Rodrigo Pflucker											11	12	DSQ	Ret									0
22	(Argentina) Camilo Echevarría							14	Ret															0
23	(Argentina) Baltazar Leguizamón	DNS	13																					0
Guest drivers ineligible for championship points
	(Argentina) Antonino García																			1				
	(Argentina) Matías Rossi																			2				
	(Uruguay) Santiago Urrutia																			3				
	(Argentina) Damián Fineschi																			4				
	(Argentina) Gastón Iansa																			5				
	(Argentina) Ricardo Risatti																			6				
	(Uruguay) Juan Manuel Casella																			7				
	(Argentina) Matías Muñoz Marchesi																			8				
	(Argentina) Ever Franetovich																			9				
	(Argentina) Lucas Bohdanowicz																				11	10	16	
	(Argentina) Javier Scuncio Moro																			Ret			10	
	(Argentina) Juan José Garriz																			10				
	(Argentina) Lucas Colombo Russell																			11				
	(Uruguay) Rodrigo Aramendía																			Ret	14	12		
	(Argentina) Norberto Fontana																			12				
	(Argentina) Christian Ledesma																			13				
	(Paraguay) Miguel García Garcia																			Ret				
	(Argentina) Figgo Bessone																			Ret				
	(Uruguay) Marcelo Ciarrocchi																			Ret				
	(Uruguay) Cyro Fontes																			Ret				
	(Argentina) Facundo Marques																			Ret				
	(Argentina) Carlos Javier Merlo																			Ret				
