= 2005 Buenos Aires 200km =

Autódromo Juan y Óscar Gálvez No 12

The 2005 200 km of Buenos Aires is the second edition of this race on the TC2000 season. The race was held in the Autódromo Juan y Óscar Gálvez in Buenos Aires.

== Results ==
Posición	Número	Piloto	Automóvil
1	4	(Argentina) Diego Aventín (Brazil) Luciano Burti	Ford Focus
2	22	(Argentina) Emiliano Spataro (Argentina) Patricio Di Palma	Volkswagen Bora
3	1	(Argentina) Christian Ledesma (Switzerland) Alain Menu	Chevrolet Astra
4	41	(Argentina) Fabian Yannantuoni (United Kingdom) Anthony Reid	Honda Civic
5	14	(Argentina) Guillermo Ortelli (Argentina) Ezequiel Bosio	Peugeot 307
6	6	(Argentina) Martín Basso (Brazil) Caca Bueno	Honda Civic
7	39	(Argentina) Mariano Altuna (Argentina) Marcos Di Palma	Chevrolet Astra
8	36	(Argentina) Fabien Flaque (Argentina) Lucas Armellini	Ford Focus
9	25	(Argentina) Crispin Beitia (Argentina) Luis Soppelsa	Ford Focus
10	24	(Argentina) Nelson Garcia (Argentina) Daniel Cingolani	Ford Focus
11	61	(Argentina) Carlos Okulovich (Argentina) Sebastián Porto	Chevrolet Astra
12	15	(Argentina) Anibal Zaniratto (Brazil) Felipe Giaffone	Peugeot 307
13	17	(Argentina) Luis Belloso (Argentina) Omar Martinez	Renault Megane
14	26	(Chile) Julio Infante (Argentina) Leonel Larrauri	Ford Focus
15	18	(Argentina) Juan Pablo Satorra (Argentina) Jose Ciantini	Renault Megane
