= Mauro Giallombardo =

Argentine racing driver

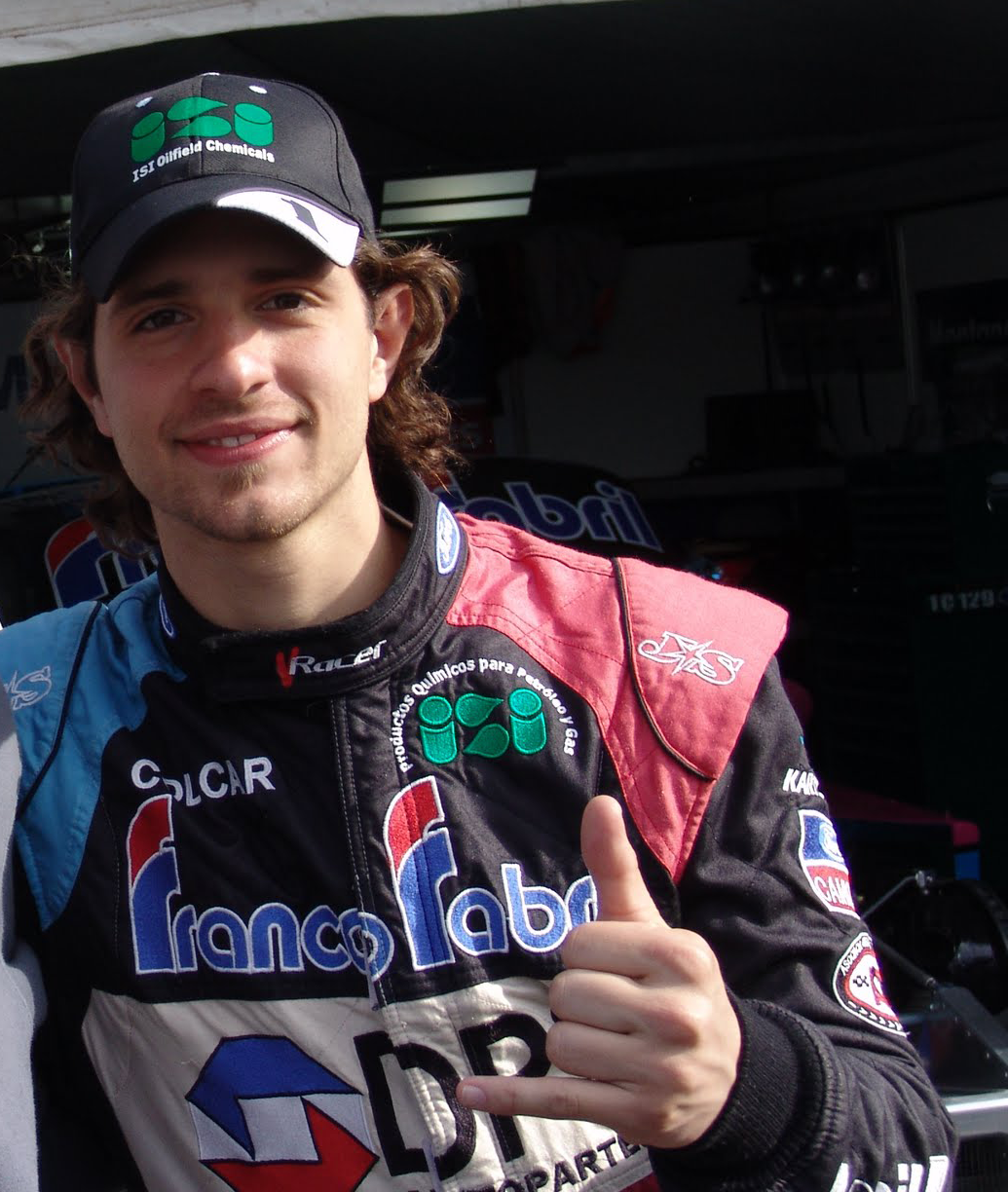
Mauro Giallombardo in 2013

Mauro Giallombardo (born December 29, 1989) is an Argentine racing driver. He has run in different series, with major success in Turismo Carretera.

Giallombardo was champion in two lower championships to Turismo Carretera: TC Mouras and TC Pista in 2008 and 2010, respectively. In 2011, he made his TC debut and won the championship the following year.

Giallombardo later debuted in Turismo Nacional, Súper TC 2000, Stock Car Brasil and Top Race V6. He won the 200 km de Buenos Aires in 2010 (with Bernardo Llaver) and 2014 (with Néstor Girolami).

In August 2017, Giallombardo had a road accident where he suffered a head injury and was in an induced coma for almost a month. After this, he focused on recovering his motor skills affected by the accident. He has not raced since.

Sporting positions
Preceded by Norberto Fontana; Ricardo Mauricio	Winner of the 200 km de Buenos Aires; 2010 (with Bernardo Llaver)	Succeeded by Mariano Werner; Esteban Guerrieri
Preceded by Guillermo Ortelli	Turismo Carretera champion 2012	Succeeded by Diego Aventin
Preceded by Mariano Werner; Esteban Guerrieri	Winner of the 200 km de Buenos Aires; 2014 (with Néstor Girolami)	Succeeded by Matías Rossi; Gabriel Ponce de León
