= Diego Aventín =

Argentine racing driver

Diego Oscar Raúl Aventín (born 21 September 1980 in Morón, Buenos Aires) is an Argentine racing driver. He has run in different series, with major success in Turismo Carretera, TC 2000 and TRV6. He is the son of former driver Oscar Aventín.

Sporting positions
Preceded by Guillermo Ortelli	Top Race V6 champion 2002	Succeeded by Juan María Traverso
Preceded by Gabriel Ponce de León; Patricio Di Palma	Winner of the 200 km de Buenos Aires; 2005 (with Luciano Burti)	Succeeded by Matías Rossi; Alain Menu
Preceded by Mauro Giallombardo	Turismo Carretera champion 2013	Succeeded by Matías Rossi
