= Ernesto Bessone =

Argentine racing driver

Ernesto Celestino "Tito" Bessone II (born 3 April 1958, in Buenos Aires) is an Argentine racing driver. He won four national championships throughout his career: TC 2000 in 1996, Turismo Carretera and Turismo Nacional Clase 3 in 2003 and Top Race in 2004.

Bessone now has a touring car team (Bratton Tito Bessone Team) which mainly competes races in the TCR South America championship. In 2023, he also fielded Esteban Guerrieri in the TCR World Tour when the series visited Uruguay and Argentina.

Sporting positions
| Preceded by Juan María Traverso | TC2000 champion 1996 | Succeeded by Henry Martin |
| Preceded by Guillermo Ortelli | Turismo Carretera champion 2003 | Succeeded by Omar Martínez |
| Preceded by Juan María Traverso | Top Race champion 2004 | Succeeded by Guillermo Ortelli |
