= Daniel Belli =

Canadian sports shooter

Personal information
- Born: 1 December 1963 (age 61); Toronto, Ontario, Canada

Sport
- Sport: Sports shooting

Daniel Belli (born 1 December 1963) is a Canadian sports shooter. He competed in the mixed skeet event at the 1984 Summer Olympics.
