= Toyota Gazoo Racing Argentina =

- Founded: 2000
- Founder(s): Darío Ramonda; Gustavo Ramonda †
- Base: Córdoba, Córdoba Province
- Team principal(s): Darío Ramonda
- Current series: TC2000; Rally Argentino; Top Race V6; Turismo Nacional; TC Pick Up; Turismo Carretera
- Teams' Championships: 3 TC2000 (2011, 2013, 2020); 2 Top Race V6 (2019, 2020)
- Drivers' Championships: 4 TC2000 (2002, 2011, 2013, 2020); 2 Top Race V6 (2019, 2020)
- Website: toyotagazooracing.com.ar

Toyota Gazoo Racing Argentina, formerly known as Toyota Team Argentina until 2016, is a racing team representing Toyota Gazoo Racing in Argentina. It is owned by Toyota's national subsidiary, Toyota Argentina. It was established in 2000 and began with official representation in the Turismo Competición 2000.

They currently compete in TC2000, Top Race V6, Rally Argentino, TC Pick Up and Turismo Carretera. In addition, they give official support to Julián Santero in Turismo Nacional.

In April 2021 it was announced that Toyota Gazoo Racing Argentina would build and manage the sales of a new TCR touring car for competition globally.

== Other activities ==
Since 2020, Julián Santero has received official support from TGR Argentina in his Turismo Nacional campaign, where he participates with a Corolla under the roof of the Tito Bessone Toyota Team. In 2021, he raced in the TC Pick Up championship, competing with Toyota Hilux units.

== See also ==
- Toyota Gazoo Racing
