= Bernardo Llaver =

Argentine racing driver

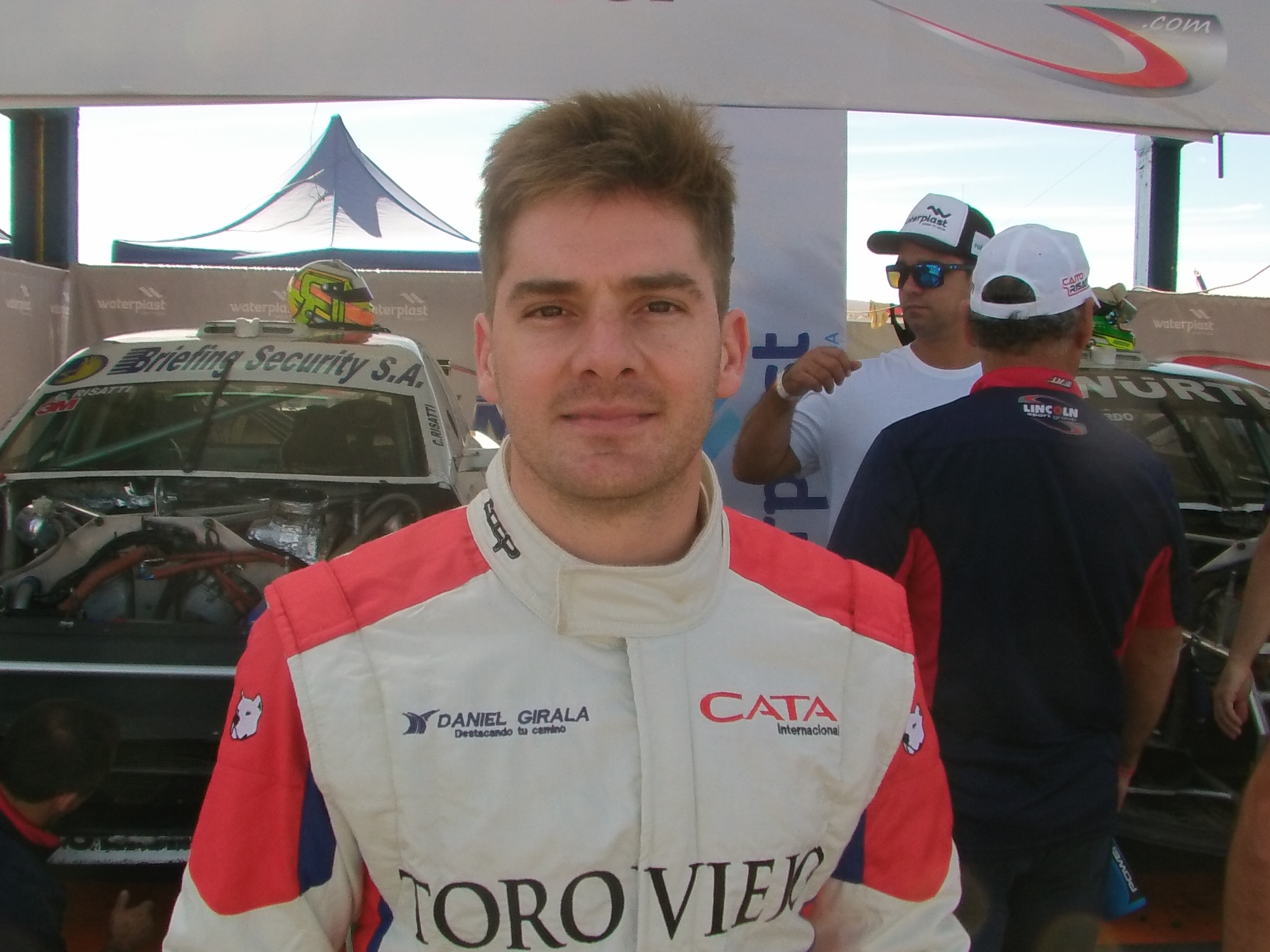
Bernardo Llaver in 2017

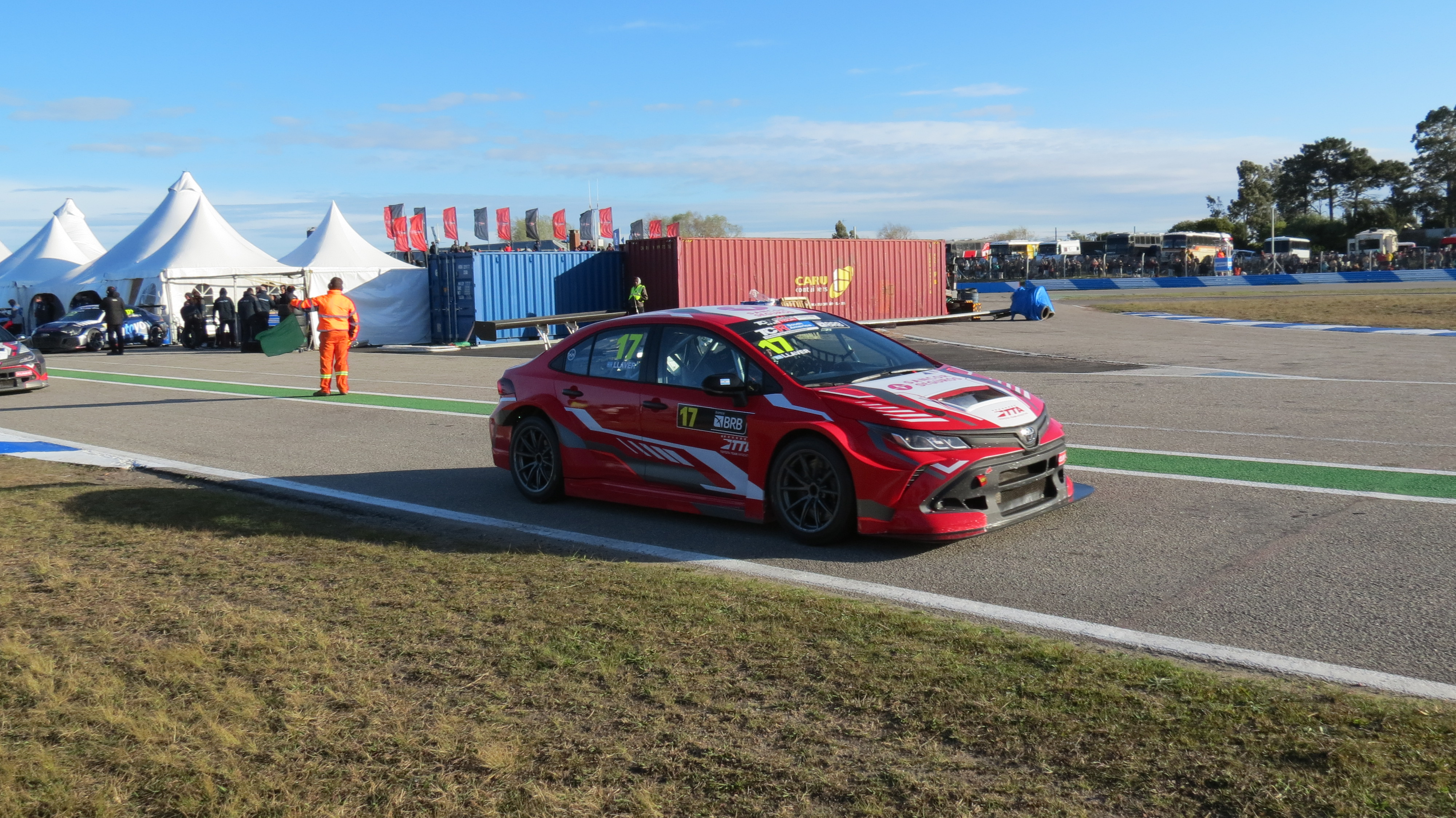
Bernardo Llaver in 2023 TCR South America Touring Car Championship

Bernardo "Berni" Llaver (San Martín, Mendoza Province; December 4, 1987) is an Argentine racing driver. He currently drives in TC2000 and TCR South America.

Since 2009, Llaver has been a driver in TC2000 (renamed Súper TC2000 between 2012 and 2021), establishing himself as a prominent figure in the series. He was a driver for several seasons with Toyota Team Argentina and later with Chevrolet YPF, achieving more than ten wins.

In 2023, Llaver competes in TC2000 with YPF Honda RV Racing and in TCR South America with Toyota Team Argentina.

== Racing record ==
=== Racing career summary ===
Season	Series	Team	Races	Wins	Poles	F/Laps	Podiums	Points	Position
2005	Fórmula Renault Argentina	?	14	0	0	0	0	17	33rd
2006	Fórmula Renault Argentina	?	14	0	1	0	1	47	12th
2007	Fórmula Renault Argentina	GF Racing	13	1	0	0	3	56	7th
2008	TC2000 Championship	Bainotti Dowen Pagio	12	0	0	0	0	2	21st
2009	TC2000 Championship	Escudería Río de la Plata/ Fineschi Racing	13	0	0	0	0	2	30th
2010	TC2000 Championship	Toyota Team Argentina	12	1	0	1	1	39	14th
2011	TC2000 Championship	Toyota Team Argentina	13	0	0	0	0	61,5	18th
2012	Súper TC2000	Toyota Team Argentina	12	0	0	0	0	51	18th
2013	Súper TC2000	Toyota Team Argentina	12	0	0	0	1	93	8th
2014	Súper TC2000	Toyota Team Argentina	13	0	0	0	0	81	12th
2015	Súper TC2000	Toyota Team Argentina	1	0	0	0	0	-	
2015	TC Pista	Di Meglio Motorsport	10	0	0	0	0	137,5	34th
2016	Súper TC2000	Fiat Petronas	13	2	0	1	3	110,5	8th
2016	TC2000	PSG-16 Team	1	0	0	0	1	-	
2017	Súper TC2000	YPF Chevrolet	14	0	0	1	4	130,5	9th
2017	TC2000	Pro Racing	2	0	0	0	1	-	
2017	Top Race V6	Lincoln Sport Group	5	0	0	0	0	0	NC
2018	Súper TC2000	Chevrolet YPF	14	1	1	1	2	135	6th
2018	TC2000	Litoral Group	1	0	0	0	0	-	
2019	Súper TC2000	Chevrolet YPF	13	0	0	1	2	44	9th
2019	TC2000	Toyota Young	1	0	0	0	0	-	
2019	Top Race V6	Azar Motorsport	4	0	0	0	0	2	18th
2020	Súper TC2000	Chevrolet YPF	19	3	0	3	4	67	6th
2021	Súper TC2000	Chevrolet YPF	19	3	0	3	4	67	6th
2022	TC2000 Championship	Chevrolet YPF	19	2	1	4	7	226	4th
2022	TCR South America Touring Car Championship	W2 ProGP	3	0	0	0	2	83	15th
2022	Turismo Nacional - Clase 3	DTA Racing	1	0	0	0	0	-	
2022	Top Race V6	Lincoln Motorsport	2	0	0	0	0	6	24th
2023	TC2000 Championship	YPF Honda RV Racing	21	2	1	0	8	192	7th
2023	TCR South America Touring Car Championship	Toyota Team Argentina	18	2	0	0	7	452	2nd
2023	TCR World Tour	Toyota Team Argentina	4	0	0	0	0	28	20th
2024	TC2000 Championship	YPF Honda RV Racing							
