= Gabriel Ponce de León =

Argentine racing driver (born 1979)

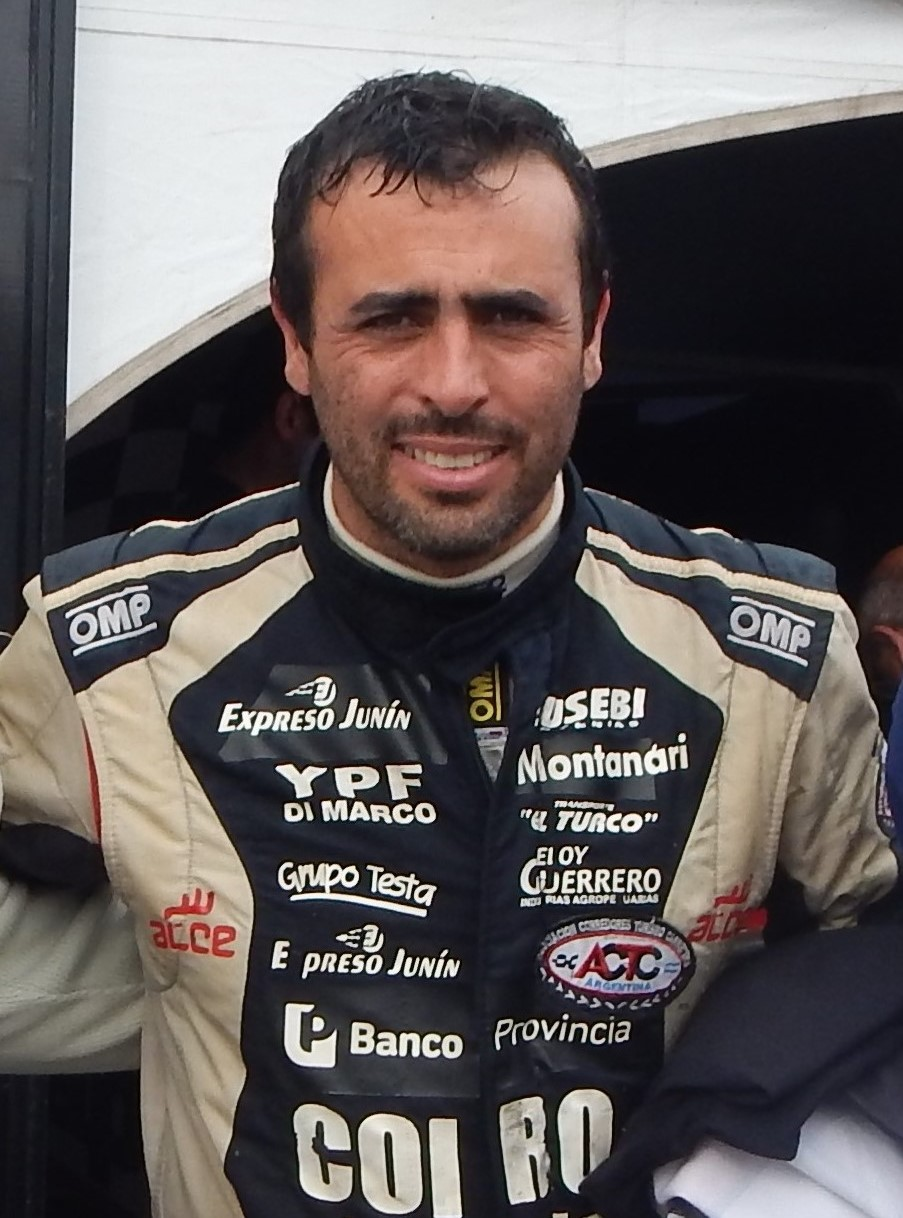
Ponce de León in 2019.

Gabriel Fernando Ponce de León (born 14 March 1979 in Junín, Buenos Aires) is an Argentine racing driver. He has run in different series, with major success in Turismo Carretera and TC 2000.

Ponce de León won the Formula Renault Argentina championship in 1998. He debuted in the TC 2000 championship the following year in the Ford YPF team of Oreste Berta. He won three titles, in 2001, 2003 and 2005. He was in the team until 2011. He remained in the series for two more years with Fiat Argentina and Honda Argentina factory-backed teams.

Since 2002, Ponce de León has been Turismo Carretera driver, where he was vice-champion in 2010. He has also competed in Top Race V6, including with the Toyota Gazoo Racing Argentina team. He was third in the 2007 championship.

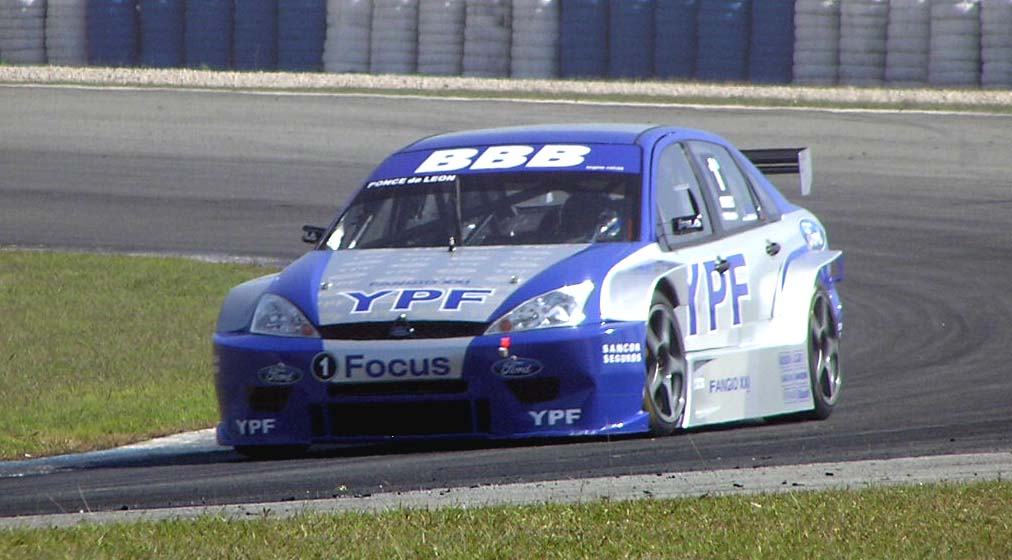
Ponce de León driving a Ford Focus TC 2000 in 2006.

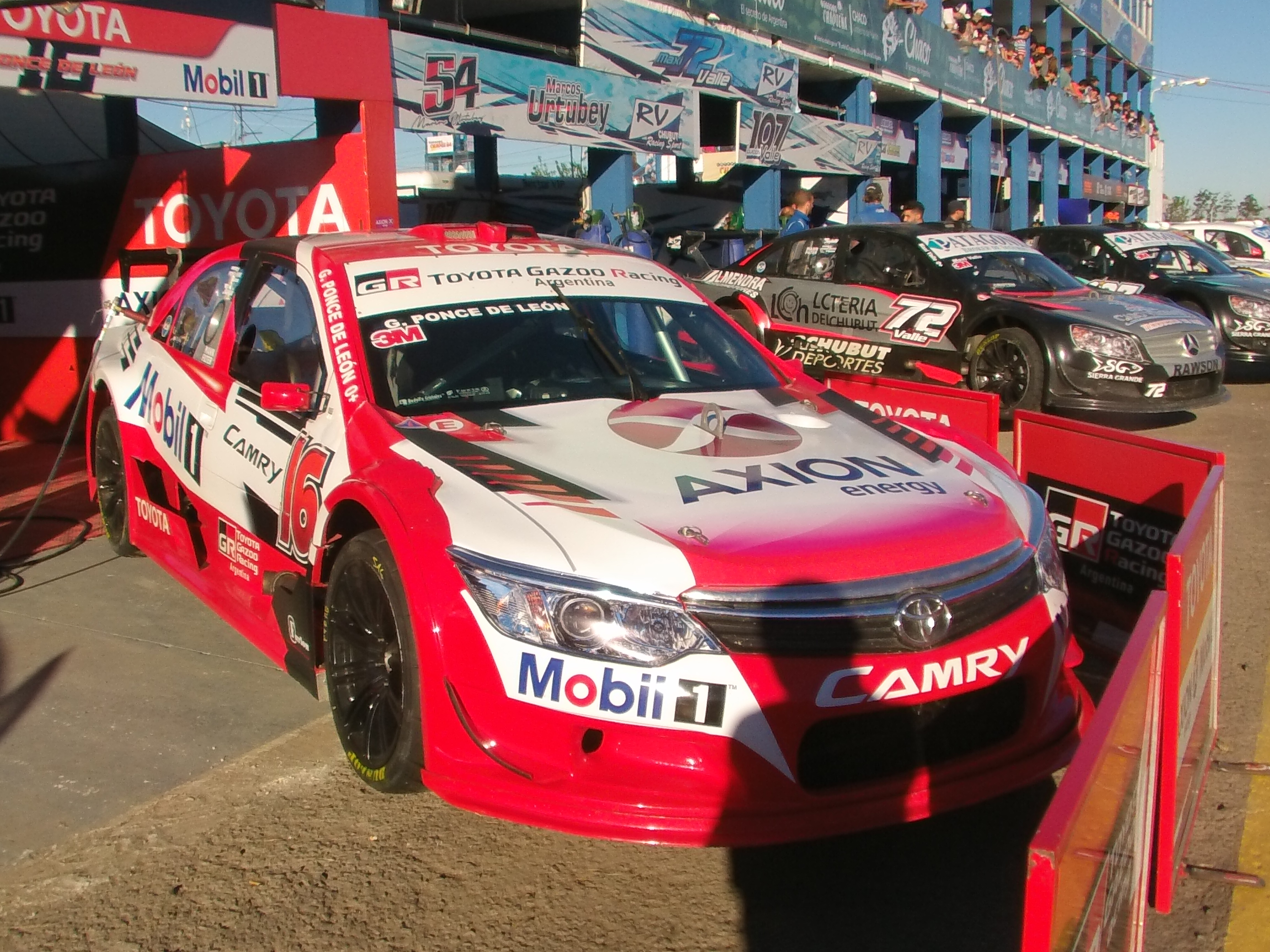
His Toyota Camry TRV6.

== Career ==
- 1996: Formula Renault Argentina
- 1997: Formula Renault Argentina
- 1998: Formula Renault Argentina (Champion), TC 2000 (Ford Escort Zetec, YPF Ford)
- 1999: TC2000 (Ford Escort Zetec, YPF Ford)
- 2000: TC2000 (Ford Escort Zetec, YPF Ford)
- 2001: TC2000 (Ford Escort Zetec, YPF Ford) (Champion)
- 2002: TC2000 (Ford Escort Zetec, YPF Ford); Turismo Carretera (Ford)
- 2003: TC2000 (Ford Focus Zetecc, YPF Ford) (Champion); Turismo Carretera (Ford)
- 2004: TC2000 (Ford Focus Zetecc, YPF Ford), won the 200 km de Buenos Aires; Turismo Carretera (Ford)
- 2005: TC2000 (Ford Focus-YPF Ford) (Champion), Turismo Carretera (Ford); TRV6 (Ford)
- 2006: TC2000 (Ford Focus-YPF Ford); Turismo Carretera (Ford); TRV6 (Ford)
- 2007: TC2000 (Ford Focus-YPF Ford); Turismo Carretera (Ford); TRV6 (Ford)
- 2008: TC2000 (Ford Focus-Ford YPF); Turismo Carretera (Ford); TRV6 (Ford)
- 2009: TC2000 (Ford Focus-Ford YPF); Turismo Carretera (Ford); TRV6 (Ford)
- 2010: TC2000 (Ford Focus-Ford YPF); Turismo Carretera (Ford) (Vice-champion)
- 2011: TC2000 (Fiat Linea, Equipo Fiat Oil Combustibles); Turismo Carretera (Ford); Turismo Nacional Clase 3 (Fiat Línea)
- 2012: Súper TC 2000 (Honda Civic IX, Honda Petrobras); Turismo Carretera (Ford)
- 2013: Turismo Carretera (Ford); TRV6 (Volkswagen)
- 2014: Turismo Carretera (Ford)
- 2015: Turismo Carretera (Ford); won the 200 km of Buenos Aires (Súper TC 2000; Toyota Corolla, guest driver)
- 2016: Turismo Carretera (Ford)
- 2017: Turismo Carretera (Ford); TRV6 (Toyota)
- 2018: Turismo Carretera (Ford); TRV6 (Toyota)
- 2019: Turismo Carretera (Ford); TRV6 (Toyota)
- 2020: Turismo Carretera (Ford)

Sporting positions
Preceded by Mauro Fartuszek	Argentine Formula Renault Champion; 1998	Succeeded by Mariano Acebal
Preceded by Daniel Cingolani	TC2000 champion 2001	Succeeded by Norberto Fontana
Preceded by Norberto Fontana	TC2000 champion 2003	Succeeded by Christian Ledesma
Preceded by None	Winner of the 200 km de Buenos Aires; 2004 (with Patricio Di Palma)	Succeeded by Diego Aventín; Luciano Burti
Preceded by Christian Ledesma	TC2000 champion 2005	Succeeded by Matías Rossi
Preceded by Néstor Girolami; Mauro Giallombardo	Winner of the 200 km de Buenos Aires; 2015 (with Matías Rossi)	Succeeded by Incumbent
