= Leonel Pernía =

Argentine racing driver

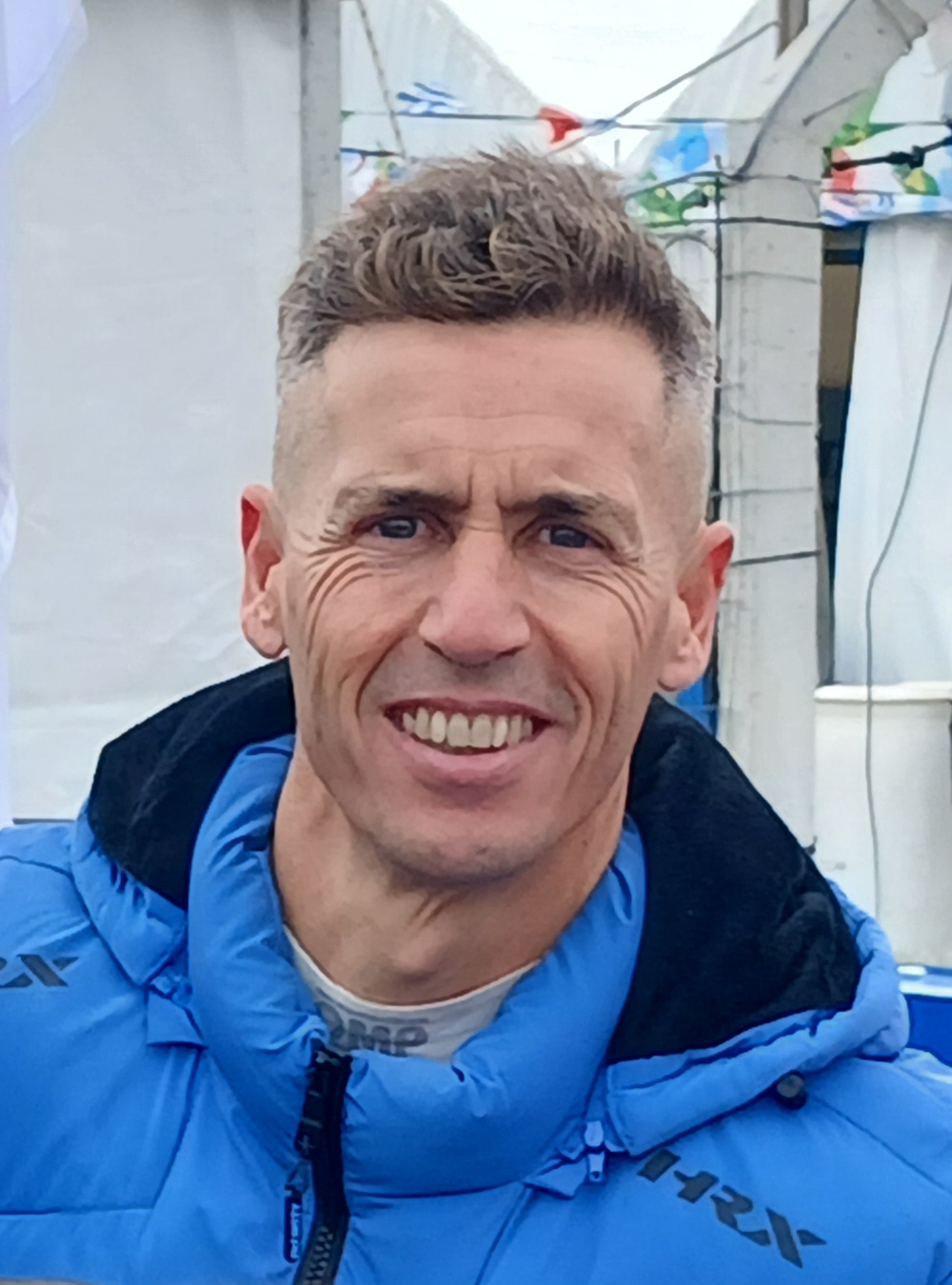
- Leonel Pernía in 2025
- Born: Leonel Adrián Pernía; September 27, 1975 (age 51) Buenos Aires (Argentina)

World Touring Car Championship career
- Debut season: 2010
- Current team: Chevrolet Motorsport Sweden
- Car number: 34
- Starts: 2
- Wins: 0
- Poles: 0
- Fastest laps: 0

Leonel Adrián Pernía (born September 27, 1975 in Buenos Aires) is an Argentine racing driver. He has run in different series, He won the TC2000 championship in 2019, 2022, 2023 and 2024, the Turismo Nacional Class 3 in 2018 and 2023, and the TCR South America in 2025.

Pernía is the son of former footballer and racing driver Vicente Pernía, and brother of Spanish international footballer Mariano Pernía. In fact, he played for Boca Juniors First Division in 1997, in the National Professional Soccer League the next two years, then raced at the Argentine Turismo Nacional in 2000 and 2001. Because of the crisis, he returned to the United States to compete in the Major Indoor Soccer League from 2002 to 2005.

In 2006, Pernía retired from football and returned to Argentina to race professionally. That year, he competed at the TC Pista in a Chevrolet (12th) and the TC2000 in a Honda (three races). The next season, Pernía raced two TC Pista races, half of the TC2000 season in a Fineschi Honda and the rest of the year in a works Honda, ending up 13th.

The next years, Pernía continued racing for Honda and was vice-championship in 2009 and 2010. He also raced at the Turismo Nacional Clase 3, the Top Race V6 and Turismo Carretera. In 2009, he also won the Drivers Masters karting all-star race in the downtown Buenos Aires streets.

In 2013, 2014 and 2015, Pernía was runner-up in Super TC2000 (successor to TC2000) behind Matías Rossi and Néstor Girolami (twice), already with the Renault Argentina factory team. In 2018 he won the Turismo Nacional Clase 3 championship for Chetta Racing with a Honda Civic. The following year, he won the Súper TC2000 with Renault. He won two more TC2000 championships (successor to Súper TC2000) in 2022, 2023 and 2024. He also won his second Turismo Nacional Clase 3 championship in 2023 for MG-C Pergamino with a Ford Focus. In 2025 he won the TCR South America for Honda YPF Racing with a Honda Civic.

== Career ==
=== Complete World Touring Car Championship results ===
(key) (Races in bold indicate pole position) (Races in italics indicate fastest lap)

Year	Team	Car	1	2	3		4	5	6	7	8	9	10	11	Position	Points
2010	Chevrolet Motorsport Sweden	Chevrolet Cruze	BRA	MAR	ITA		BEL	POR	UK	CZE	GER	ESP	JPN	MAC	18th	1
2010	Chevrolet Motorsport Sweden	Chevrolet Cruze			18	10									18th	1
