= Guillermo Ortelli =

Racing driver from Argentina

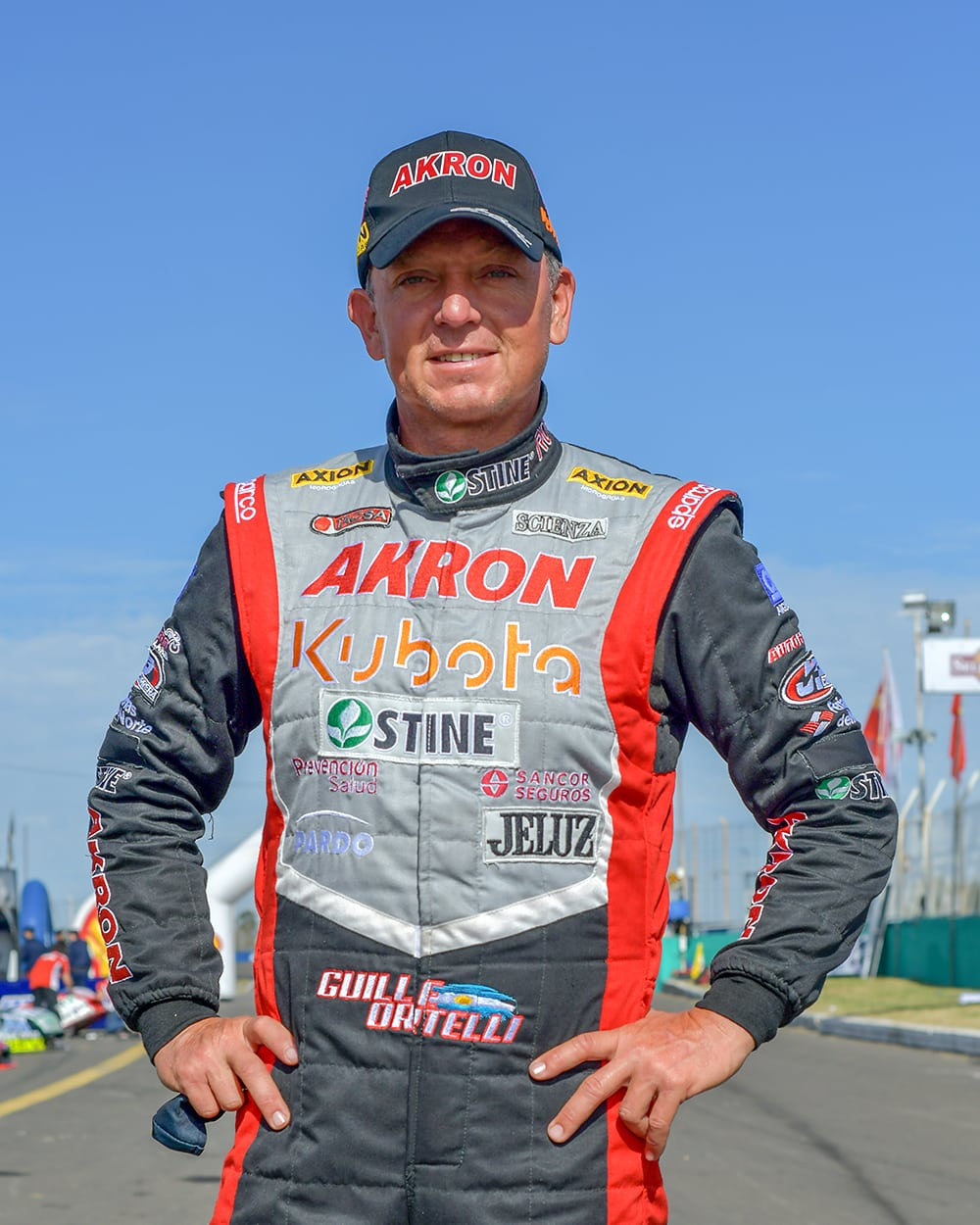
- Ortelli in 2021
- Nationality: Argentine
- Born: Guillermo Javier Ortelli; 25 April 1973 (age 53) Salto, Buenos Aires Province

Championship titles
- 1998, 2000, 2001, 2002, 2008, 2011, 2016: Turismo Carretera

Guillermo Javier Ortelli (born in Salto, Buenos Aires Province on April 25, 1973) is an Argentine race car driver, who currently is competing in several domestic series. He is one of the drivers with the most titles in the history of Turismo Carretera: seven.

== Biography ==
After having some success in football (he played for homecity's Club Sports Salto until 5th division and was champion once), Ortelli started his career in motor racing.

Ortelli's father, Hugo, bought him a go-kart when he was 16 years old so he could compete in the Buenos Aires Province kart tournament. He was vice-champion in the series with rivals as Norberto Fontana. His talent was worthy of an invite by Tulio Crespi to drive for Argentine Formula Renault.

The two-year period in Formula Renault meant an opportunity to drive a Tulio Crespi's Ford Escort XR3 in TC2000 series. He also started his career in Turismo Carretera (TC), the most popular car racing category in Argentina. In 1998, he became the youngest TC champion. He was distinguished by Clarín and Olimpia Awards that year.

Ortelli got his second TC championship in 2000, assisted by Jorge Pedersoli and Sandro Crespi. He was also vice-champion in Top Race that year. The conflict between ACTC and CDA (ACA) meant that he could not compete in TC2000 (he was planned to partner Juan María Traverso and Lucas Armelini in Toyota team).

Ortelli managed to win both the 2001 Top Race and TC Championships to Omar Martínez in the last race of each season. After the ACTC-ACA conflict came to an end, he could return to TC2000 at the wheel of Honda partnering Juan Manuel Silva and Oscar Larrauri.

In 2002, Ortelli was recruited by Tango Racing to drive for ARCA series. He took part of one race at the wheel of Chevy Monte Carlo but did not finish. He returned to Argentina and crowned himself again as Turismo Carretera champion.

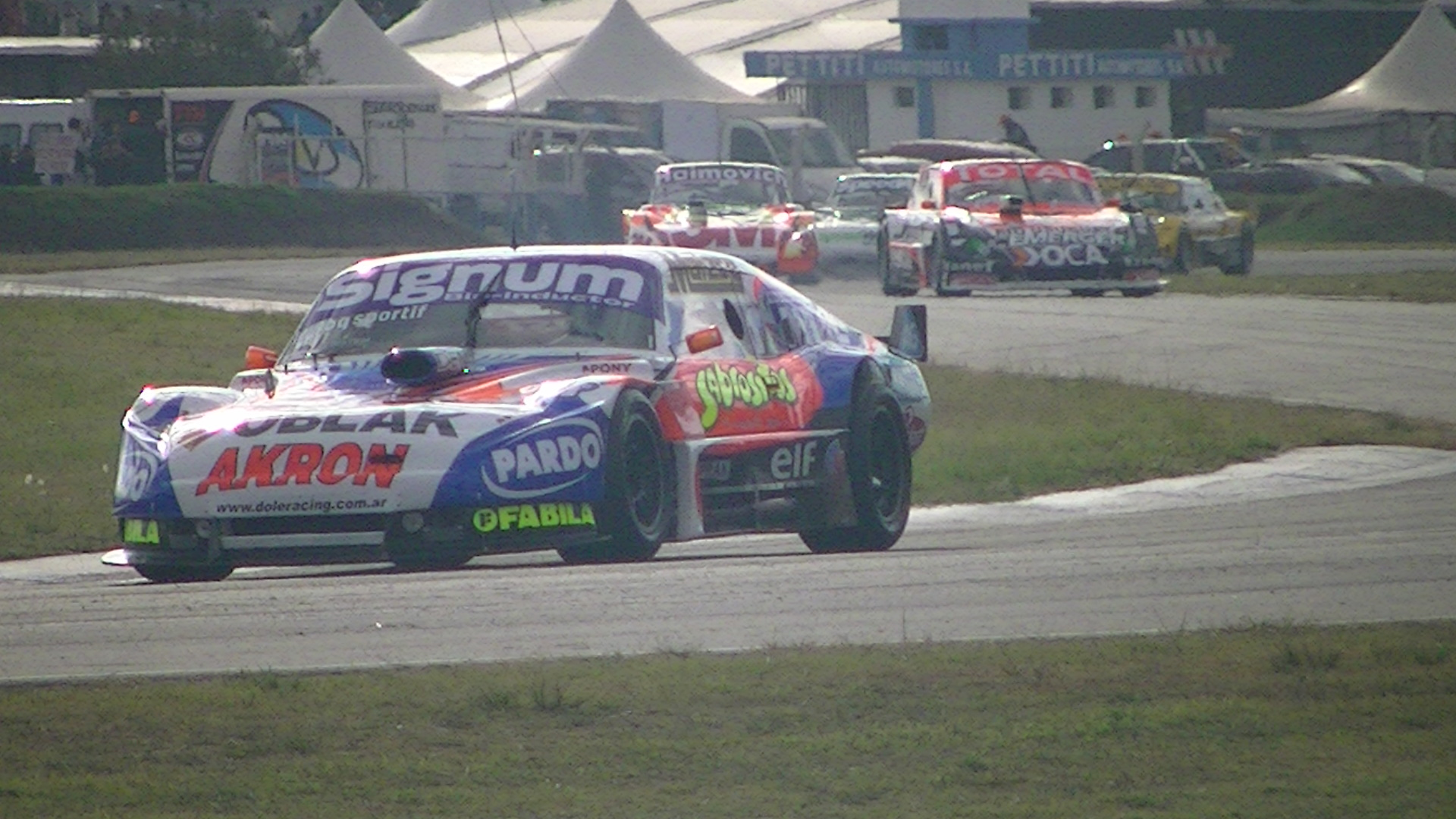
Guillermo Ortelli in 2012

Ortelli returned to new-born Top Race V6 in 2005, driving a Chevrolet Vectra sponsored by Club Atlético Boca Juniors. He snatched away with the title at the end of the season.

From 2006 to 2008, Ortelli continued in TC2000 in the works Chevrolet squad, finishing sixth, fourth, and second respectively. In 2009, he switched to Chevrolet, where he resulted eighth that year and 11th the next year. Therefore, he returned to Renault for 2011.

In 2010, Ortelli won the Konex Award as one of the five best Racing Drivers from the last decade in Argentina.

It continues to the present in TC. Ortelli was champion again in 2016, but has not won a race since that year. Ortelli has statistics close to 400 races, 30 victories, 30 poles and 100 podiums. Between 2012 and 2014, he raced with Renault in Súper TC 2000 and between 2014 and 2017 in Turismo Nacional.

== Titles ==
Sporting positions
Preceded by Juan María Traverso	Turismo Carretera champion 1998	Succeeded by Juan María Traverso
Preceded by Juan María Traverso	Turismo Carretera champion 2000–2002	Succeeded by Ernesto Bessone
Preceded by Omar Martínez	Top Race V6 champion 2001	Succeeded by Diego Aventín
Preceded by Ernesto Bessone	Top Race V6 champion 2005	Succeeded by Omar Martínez
Preceded by Christian Ledesma	Turismo Carretera champion 2008	Succeeded by Emanuel Moriatis
Preceded by Agustín Canapino	Turismo Carretera champion 2011	Succeeded by Mauro Giallombardo
Preceded by Omar Martínez	Turismo Carretera champion 2016	Succeeded by Agustín Canapino
