= Emiliano Spataro =

Racing driver from Argentina

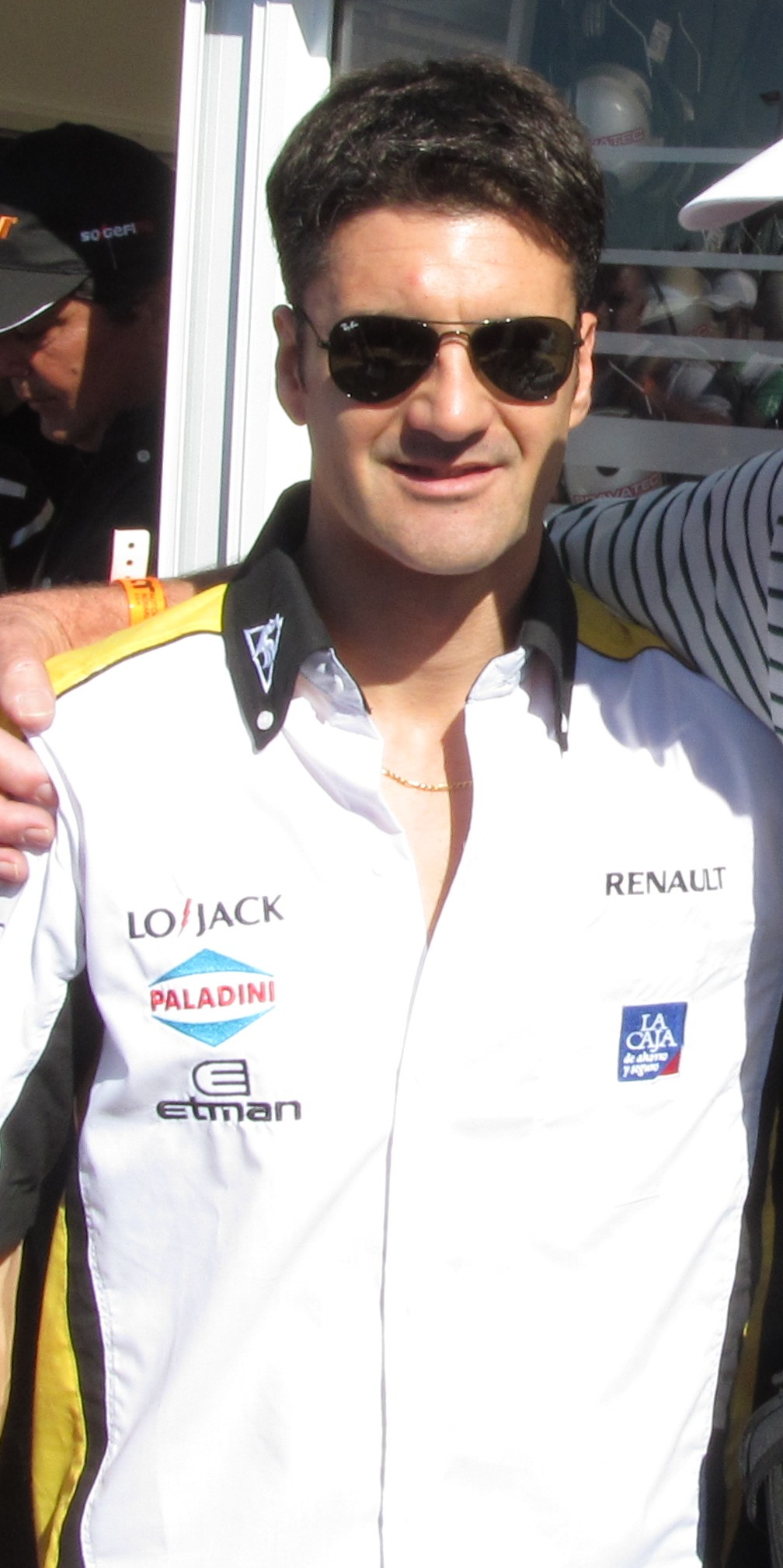
- Spataro in 2013
- Nationality: Argentine
- Born: 25 May 1976 (age 50) Lanús, Buenos Aires Province, Argentina

Previous series
- 1994 1995 1996 1997 1997–1999 2000–2023 2002–2024 2005–2012: Fórmula Honda Argentina; Formula 3 Sudamericana; Italian Super Formula; International Formula 3000 Championship; South American Super Touring Car Championship; TC2000; Turismo Carretera; Top Race V6

Championship titles
- 1995 1999 2007, 2008: Formula 3 Sudamericana; South American Super Touring Car Championship; Top Race V6

Emiliano Spataro (born 25 May 1976 in Lanús, Buenos Aires) is an Argentine racing driver. He has run in different series, with major success in Turismo Carretera, TC 2000, Top Race and Formula Three Sudamericana. He also raced at the 2010 Dakar Rally.

== Career results ==
- 1992: Karting
- 1993: Karting
- 1994: Fórmula Honda Argentina
- 1995: Formula Three Sudamericana Light (Champion)
- 1996: Italian Super Formula, one win
- 1997: Formula 3000; South American Super Touring Car Championship (BMW 320i)
- 1998: South American Super Touring Car Championship (Alfa Romeo 155)
- 1999: South American Super Touring Car Championship (Peugeot 406)(Champion), with Cacá Bueno
- 2000: TC2000 (Peugeot 306) Peugeot Sport
- 2001: TC2000 (Peugeot 306) Peugeot Sport
- 2002: TC2000, Turismo Carretera (Chevrolet)
- 2003: TC2000
- 2004: TC2000 Sportteam (Volkswagen Bora) and DTA (Chevrolet Astra)
- 2005: TC2000 Sportteam (Volkswagen Bora)
- 2006: TC2000 Sportteam (Volkswagen Bora), ninth; Turismo Carretera
- 2007: TC2000 Renault (Renault Mégane), sixth; Turismo Carretera BA; TRV6 Oro (champion)
- 2008: Turismo Carretera BA, Haz; TRV6 Oro (champion)
- 2009: TC2000 Fiat (Fiat Linea); Turismo Carretera Plavicon, BA; TRV6 Midas
- 2010: TC2000 Fiat (Fiat Linea), fourth; Turismo Carretera SFP, Alifraco (Chevrolet); TRV6 Midas

=== International F3000 results ===
(key) (Races in bold indicate pole position) (Races in italics indicate fastest lap)

Year	Team	1	2	3	4	5	6	7	8	9	10	Pos.	Pts
1997	Coloni Motorsport	SIL; DNQ	PAU; DNQ	HEL; DNQ	NÜR; 11	EPG; 13	HOC; 16	SPI; 12	SPA; Ret	MUG; Ret	JER	30th	0

Spataro faced a fine in 2026 for not submitting front camera footage.

Sporting positions
Preceded by Oscar Larrauri	South American Super Touring Car Champion; 1999; Cacá Bueno	Succeeded by Oscar Larrauri
Preceded by Omar Martínez	TRV6 champion 2007–2008	Succeeded by José María López
