= Christian Ledesma =

Argentine racing driver (born 1976)

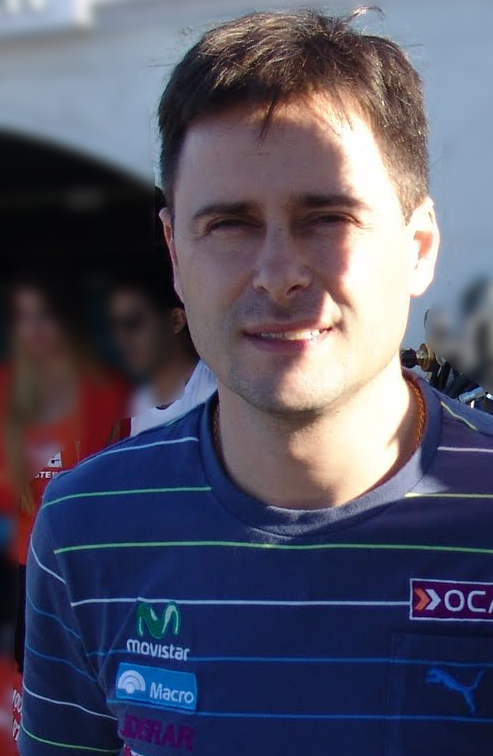
Christian Ledesma in 2013

Christian Ariel Ledesma (born February 4, 1976, in Mar del Plata, Buenos Aires Province) is an Argentine racing driver. He has run in different series, with major success in Turismo Carretera (2007 champion) and TC2000/STC2000 (2004 champion).

== Career ==
=== Junior series ===
From 1987 to 1994, Ledesma took part of more than 100 races, being three times champion and four times vice-champion (Junior Category, Senior Category and Sudam Senior Series) and driving for his brother Jhonny Ledesma's team.

=== Formula Honda ===
Ledesma took part of 1994 Drivers' National Contest, Prodriver. He was the winner of the first contest among 40 participants and got the right of driving for Formula Honda's Prodriver team, managed by Guillermo Kissling.

Ledesma won the 1995 Argentine Champhionship by mid-season; he got six pole positions, six wins and ten podiums in ten races.

=== South American Formula 3 ===
Ledesma took part of the 1996 championship becoming the best rookie of the season, at the wheel of a Tom's Toyota of Víctor Rosso's ProRacing team. He got a third place at Goiânia, Brazil, and finished tenth overall in the championship.

=== Formula Super Renault ===
Ledesma got the 1997 Argentine Formula Super Renault title driving a Reynard/Renault of Guillermo and Raúl Kissling's team - four wins, and eight podiums overall.

=== Formula 3000 ===
Ledesma tested for F3000's Team Draco at Magione, Italy. He managed to score 1:06.500 - 0.3 seconds away from the fastest driver of the test's time.

=== Touring car series ===
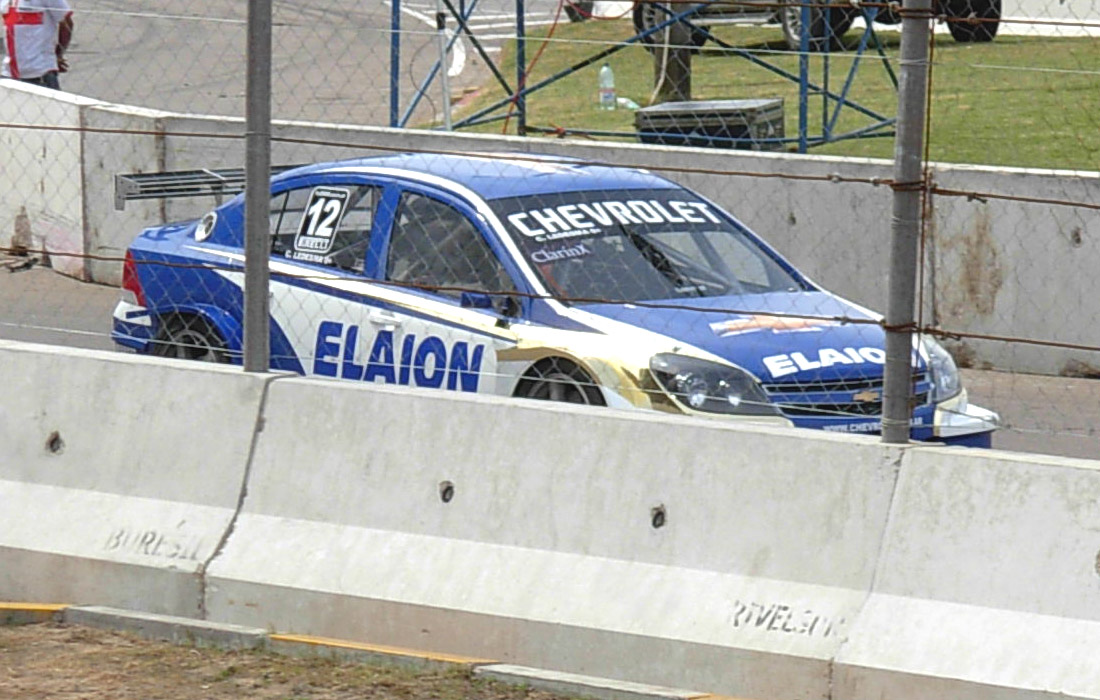
Ledesma driving a Chevrolet at the opening round of the 2010 TC 2000 season in Punta del Este, Uruguay

Ledesma's debut in TC 2000 was in the second race of 2003 season. That first year, he got two wins, Bahía Blanca and Río Cuarto, and one third place at Mar del Plata.

Ledesma crowned himself as 2004 champion, with four wins overall. It was the first time Chevrolet got a championship inside TC2000 series.

Ledesma fought the 2006 to 2008 championships, resulting fifth, third and fourth respectively. After a poor 2009, he was ninth in 2010. In 2011, he continued racing for Chevrolet, now with a Chevrolet Cruze. He competed on the Chevrolet Argentina factory team until 2012. Then he went through others in the category until 2016, his final year in the championship.

In Turismo Carretera (TC), Ledesma started driving a Ford (1998–2000). As of 2001, he has been driving a Chevrolet.

Ledesma clinched the 2007 championship, with six wins and 294.5 points overall. In addition to that, he broke Juan María Traverso's 1995 pointscoring record (five wins and 272 points). He was runner-up in 2014 and has won more than 20 races in his TC career.

Ledesma also competed in Turismo Nacional, Top Race V6 and TC Pick Up.

== See also ==
- Office site (in Spanish)
- Driver profile (HistoricRacing.com) (in English)

Sporting positions
Preceded by Gabriel Ponce de León	TC2000 champion 2004	Succeeded by Gabriel Ponce de León
Preceded by Norberto Fontana	Turismo Carretera champion 2007	Succeeded by Guillermo Ortelli
