= Mariano Werner =

Argentine racing driver (born 1988)

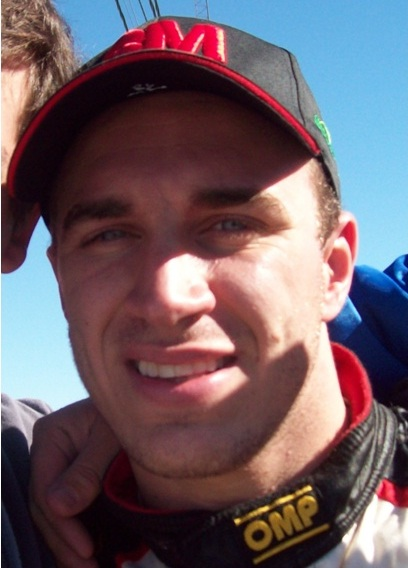
- Werner in 2013
- Nationality: Argentine
- Born: Mariano Raúl Werner; 30 December 1988 (age 37) Paraná, Entre Ríos, Argentina

Turismo Carretera
- Years active: 2009–present
- Starts: 231
- Wins: 23 (Finals); 53 (Heats)
- Poles: 27
- Fastest laps: 27
- Best finish: 1st in 2020, 2021, 2023

Championship titles
- 2020, 2021, 2023: Turismo Carretera

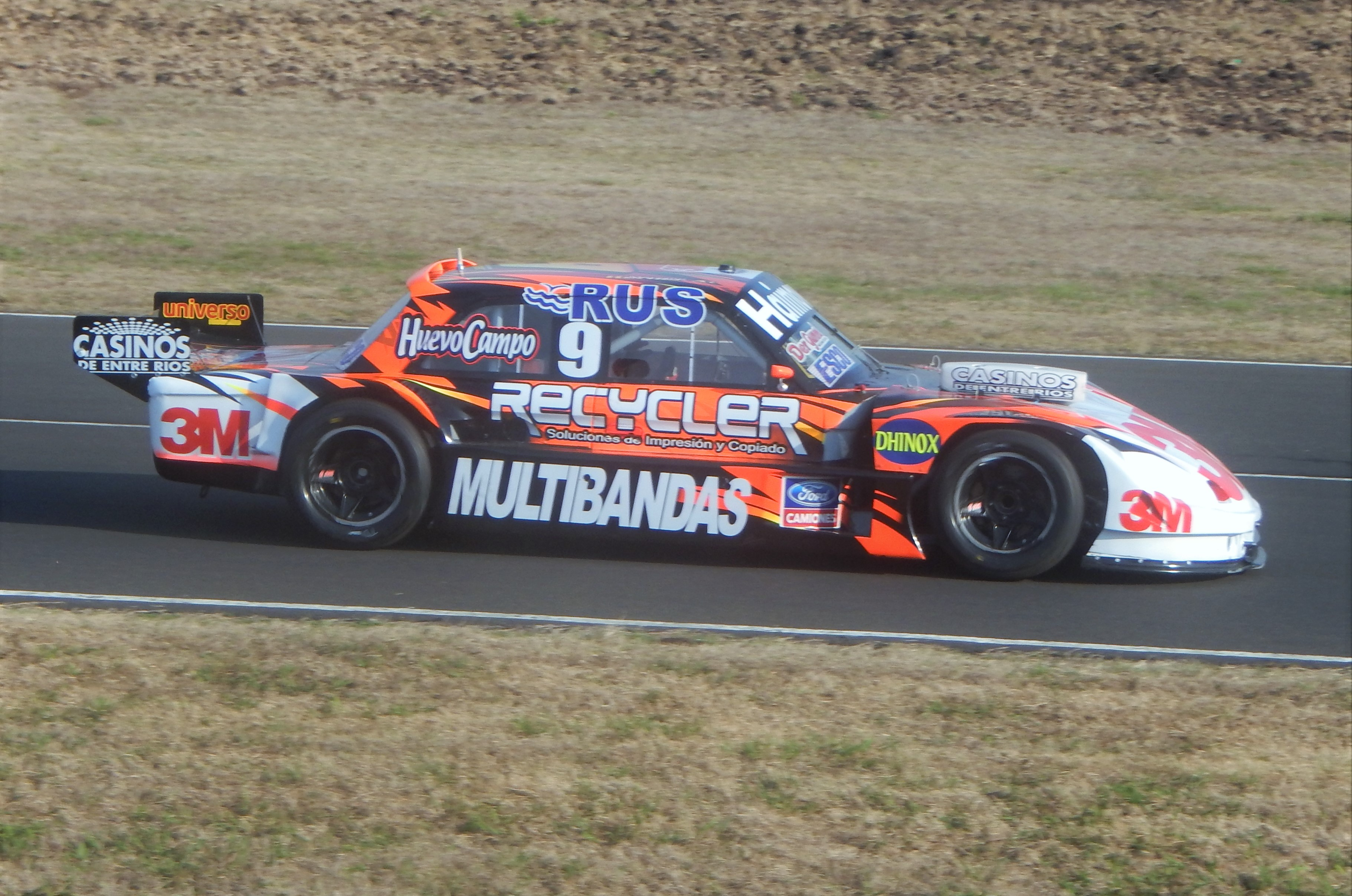
Mariano Werner in Turismo Carretera (2015)

Mariano Raúl Werner (born December 30, 1988) is an Argentine motor racing driver. He is currently competing in Turismo Carretera (TC), Turismo Nacional (TN) and TC Pick Up series.

Throughout his career, Werner has won seven national championships: Formula Renault Argentina (2006 and 2007), Turismo Nacional Clase 3 (2017), Turismo Carretera (2020, 2021 and 2023) and TC Pick Up (2023).

== Career ==
Werner started his career in 2005 in the FR national series. He stayed two more years in this series, winning the 2006 and 2007 championships. He was racing for the Werner Competición team. In 2006, he competed in a Formula Renault 2.0 Eurocup round with Jenzer.

In 2007, Werner finished third in TC Pista, which allowed him to promote to Turismo Carretera the next year. In 2008, Werner also made his TC 2000 debut with Toyota Team Argentina and in 2009 wins for the first time in both series.

In 2010, competing with Omar Martínez's team, Werner lost the TC championship for not having won a final race. It was he who added the most points in the play-offs but victory was a necessary requirement and then the title went to Agustín Canapino. Besides he was third in the TC 2000 championship.

In 2011, Werner finished second in TC 2000, behind Matías Rossi. In 2013 and 2016, he is runner-up in the TC championship.

After an illegal maneuver on Matías Rossi on the last lap of the final TC race in 2016, Werner was sanctioned with exclusion for the middle of the 2017 season and a financial fine. Werner took Rossi off the track in the last corner and caused him to lose the championship to Guillermo Ortelli.

In 2017, Werner was third in the Súper TC 2000 championship (successor to TC 2000) with a Peugeot 408 of Team Peugeot Total Argentina and Turismo Nacional Clase 3 champion with a Fiat Linea of FP Racing. He was third in 2018 in TN Clase 3 and in 2019 in TC.

Werner was TC champion in the 2020 season. With three victories, he won the play-off with a 20 points of advantage. That same year, he also raced in TC Pick Up with a Toyota Hilux.

Werner was again champion of Turismo Carretera in 2021. He scored fewer points in the play-offs than Uruguayan Mauricio Lambiris, but Lambiris did not achieve the victory necessary to be champion.

Having lost the championship to José Manuel Urcera in 2022, Werner claimed his third TC title in 2023 and also secured the TC Pick Up championship.

== Racing record ==
=== Racing career summary ===
| Season | Series | Team | Races | Wins | Poles | F/Laps | Podiums | Points | Position |
|---|---|---|---|---|---|---|---|---|---|
| 2005 | Formula Renault Argentina | Werner Competición | 13 | 2 | 3 | 2 | 4 | 101 | 4th |
| 2006 | Formula Renault Argentina | Werner Competición | 13 | 7 | 7 | 6 | 8 | 175 | **1st** |
| 2006 | Eurocup Formula Renault 2.0 | Team Jenzer | 2 | 0 | 0 | 0 | 0 | N/A | NC |
| 2007 | Formula Renault Argentina | Werner Jr | 13 | 10 | 10 | 8 | 13 | 236 | **1st** |
| 2007 | TC Pista | Rush Racing | 15 | 3 | 0 | 4 | 4 | 156 | **3rd** |
| 2007 | TC2000 | Ford YPF; Toyota Team Argentina | 4 | 0 | 0 | 0 | 0 | N/A | NC |
| 2008 | Turismo Carretera | Micheli Motorsport | 9 | 0 | 0 | 0 | 0 | 32,5 | 34th |
| 2008 | TC2000 | Toyota Team Argentina | 14 | 0 | 0 | 0 | 1 | 46 | 13th |
| 2009 | Turismo Carretera | Micheli Motorsport; Martínez Competición | 15 | 1 | 0 | 0 | 1 | 101,5 | 18th |
| 2009 | TC2000 | Toyota Team Argentina | 13 | 2 | 1 | 0 | 2 | 65 | 7th |
| 2009 | TC2000 - Copa Endurance Series | Toyota Team Argentina | 3 | 0 | 0 | 0 | 0 | 1 | 26th |
| 2009 | Top Race V6 | Martínez Competición | 1 | 0 | 0 | 0 | 0 | N/A | NC |
| 2010 | Turismo Carretera | Martínez Competición | 15 | 0 | 2 | 2 | 5 | 209,25 | **3rd** |
| 2010 | TC2000 | Toyota Team Argentina | 13 | 0 | 1 | 2 | 4 | 94 | **3rd** |
| 2010 | TC2000 - Copa Endurance Series | Toyota Team Argentina | 3 | 0 | 1 | 2 | 2 | 38 | **1st** |
| 2010 | Top Race V6 - Torneo Clausura | Schick Racing | 1 | 0 | 0 | 0 | 0 | 7 | 36th |
| 2011 | Turismo Carretera | Martínez Competición | 12 | 1 | 3 | 0 | 3 | 124,75 | 13th |
| 2011 | TC2000 | Toyota Team Argentina | 13 | 1 | 2 | 1 | 4 | 182,5 | **2nd** |
| 2011 | Top Race V6 | Schick Racing | 3 | 0 | 0 | 1 | 1 | N/A | NC |
| 2012 | Turismo Carretera | 3M Racing | 16 | 1 | 1 | 0 | 1 | 116,25 | 15th |
| 2012 | Súper TC2000 | Toyota Team Argentina | 13 | 2 | 2 | 0 | 3 | 151 | 5th |
| 2012 | TC Mouras - Guest Drivers Tournament | Alifraco Sport | 1 | 0 | 0 | 0 | 0 | 2,25 | 33rd |
| 2013 | Turismo Carretera | Lincoln Sport Group | 16 | 1 | 3 | 0 | 4 | 493,75 | **2nd** |
| 2013 | Súper TC2000 | Toyota Team Argentina | 12 | 0 | 0 | 0 | 3 | 136 | 6th |
| 2013 | TC Mouras - Guest Drivers Tournament | Werner Competición | 3 | 0 | 1 | 0 | 1 | 46 | 7th |
| 2014 | Turismo Carretera | 3M Werner Competición | 16 | 1 | 2 | 1 | 3 | 362 | 9th |
| 2014 | Súper TC2000 | Equipo Petronas | 12 | 1 | 1 | 1 | 2 | 157 | 6th |
| 2014 | TC Mouras - Guest Drivers Tournament | Werner Competición | 4 | 1 | 0 | 0 | 4 | 74 | **1st** |
| 2014 | Turismo Nacional Clase 3 | Vittal G Racing Car | 11 | 1 | 0 | 1 | 3 | 173 | 6th |
| 2015 | Turismo Carretera | Werner Competición | 16 | 1 | 3 | 1 | 2 | 371 | 7th |
| 2015 | Súper TC2000 | Lincoln Sport Group | 13 | 0 | 0 | 0 | 0 | 67 | 16th |
| 2015 | TC Mouras - Guest Drivers Tournament | Werner Competición | 2 | 0 | 0 | 0 | 0 | 17,5 | 22nd |
| 2015 | Top Race V6 | ABH Sport | 2 | 0 | 0 | 0 | 0 | 21 | 26th |
| 2016 | Turismo Carretera | Werner Competición | 15 | 3 | 3 | 4 | 9 | 646 | **3rd** |
| 2016 | Súper TC2000 | Team Peugeot Total Argentina | 14 | 0 | 2 | 2 | 0 | 160 | 5th |
| 2017 | Turismo Carretera | Werner Competición | 9 | 1 | 1 | 2 | 1 | 264,75 | 23rd |
| 2017 | Súper TC2000 | Team Peugeot Total Argentina | 14 | 1 | 0 | 0 | 3 | 180 | **3rd** |
| 2017 | Turismo Nacional Clase 3 | FP Racing | 12 | 1 | 1 | 2 | 6 | 273,5 | **1st** |
| 2018 | Turismo Carretera | Werner Competición | 15 | 1 | 2 | 2 | 3 | 441,5 | 4th |
| 2018 | Súper TC2000 | Team Peugeot Total Argentina | 13 | 2 | 0 | 1 | 4 | 128 | 7th |
| 2018 | Turismo Nacional Clase 3 | FP Racing | 12 | 3 | 1 | 3 | 5 | 247,5 | **3rd** |
| 2019 | Turismo Carretera | Fadel DTA Racing | 15 | 1 | 1 | 2 | 3 | 485,25 | **3rd** |
| 2019 | Súper TC2000 | Fiat Racing Team STC2000 | 13 | 0 | 0 | 1 | 3 | 60 | 7th |
| 2019 | Turismo Nacional Clase 3 | FPC Competición; Fiat FP Racing | 3 | 0 | 0 | 0 | 0 | 43 | 28th |
| 2020 | Turismo Carretera | Memo Corse by DTA; Memo Corse by Azul | 11 | 3 | 5 | 3 | 6 | 389,25 | **1st** |
| 2020 | TC Pick Up | Homero Racing | 7 | 2 | 1 | 2 | 2 | 231 | **3rd** |
| 2020 | Turismo Nacional Clase 3 | SL Sports Racing | 5 | 0 | 0 | 0 | 0 | 36 | 24th |
| 2021 | Turismo Carretera | Martínez Competición | 15 | 4 | 6 | 3 | 6 | 660.75 | **1st** |
| 2021 | TC Pick Up | Toyota Gazoo Racing Argentina | 11 | 2 | 4 | 2 | 4 | 287 | **3rd** |
| 2021 | Turismo Nacional Clase 3 | SL Sports Racing | 11 | 1 | 4 | 1 | 2 | 176 | 12th |
| 2022 | Turismo Carretera | Fadel Werner Competición | 15 | 2 | 1 | 2 | 5 | 466 | **2nd** |
| 2022 | TC Pick Up | Toyota Gazoo Racing Argentina | 11 | 2 | 3 | 2 | 4 | 272.5 | 6th |
| 2023 | Turismo Carretera | Fadel Werner Competición | 15 | 3 | 5 | 3 | 4 | 676.5 | **1st** |
| 2023 | TC Pick Up | Toyota Gazoo Racing Argentina | 12 | 3 | 3 | 3 | 7 | 652.5 | **1st** |
| 2023 | Turismo Nacional - Clase 3 | Coiro Dole Racing | 5 | 0 | 2 | 0 | 0 | 59 | 24th |
| 2023 | Trans-Am - TA2 Series | Memo Corse | 3 | 0 | 0 | 0 | 0 | 104 | 41st |

=== Complete Eurocup Formula Renault 2.0 results ===
(key) (Races in bold indicate pole position; races in italics indicate fastest lap)

| Year | Entrant | 1 | 2 | 3 | 4 | 5 | 6 | 7 | 8 | 9 | 10 | 11 | 12 | 13 | 14 | DC | Points |
|---|---|---|---|---|---|---|---|---|---|---|---|---|---|---|---|---|---|
| 2006 | Team Jenzer | ZOL; 1 | ZOL; 2 | IST; 1 | IST; 2 | MIS; 1 | MIS; 2 | NÜR; 1 | NÜR; 2 | DON; 1 | DON; 2 | LMS; 1 | LMS; 2 | CAT; 1; 23 | CAT; 2; 28† | NC† | 0 |

† As Werner was a guest driver, he was ineligible for points

=== Turismo Carretera results ===
(key) (Races in bold indicate pole position) (Races in italics indicate fastest lap) (Numbers in ^{superscript} indicate heat race results)

| Year | Team | Car | 1 | 2 | 3 | 4 | 5 | 6 | 7 | 8 | 9 | 10 | 11 | 12 | 13 | 14 | 15 | 16 | Pos. | Pts |
|---|---|---|---|---|---|---|---|---|---|---|---|---|---|---|---|---|---|---|---|---|
| 2008 | Micheli Motorsport | Ford Falcon | MDA | BAL | BUA1 | SLU1; DNQ^{46} | 9DJ; 24 | TRH; 24 | PAR1; 20 | POS; Ret | RAF; 32 | RCU; DNQ | SLT; DNQ | SLU2; 27 | OLA | PAR2 | LPL | BUA2 | 34th | 32.5 |
| 2009 | Gurí Martínez Competición | Ford Falcon | MDA; 30 | BAL; 41 | BUA1; 39 | RCU; 31 | TRH1; 45 | RAF; 8 | POS ? | PDF ? | 9DJ ? | TRH2 ? | BUA2 ? | PAR; 1 | SLU ? | OLA ? | LPL ? | BUA3 ? | 18th | 101.5 |
| 2010 | Gurí Martínez Competición | Ford Falcon | MDA; 4^{?} | BAL; 10^{?} | BUA1; 5^{8} | NEU; 2^{1} | TRH; 5^{1} | RAF; 11^{7} | POS; 15^{9} | BUA2; 11^{3} | RCU; DSQ^{?} | SLT; 28^{?} | 9DJ; 44^{3} | TLW; 2^{1} | OLA; 2^{2} | PAR; 2^{1} | LPL; 4^{2} | BUA3; 2^{2} | 3rd | 209.25 |
| 2011 | Gurí Martínez Competición | Ford Falcon | MDA; 3^{2} | TLW ? | SLU; 11^{3} | NEU; 1^{1} | TRH; 21^{7} | BUA1 ? | POS; 31^{3} | RAF ? | RCU; 37^{1} | JUN; 31^{9} | PAR ? | OLA; 9^{5} | RGA; 41^{6} | LPL; 2^{1} | BAL; 45^{12} | BUA2; 11^{5} | 13th | 124.75 |
| 2012 | Werner Competición | Ford Falcon | MDA; 17^{6} | PAR1; 21^{5} | MDZ; 18^{1} | TLW; 4^{2} | TRH; 41^{8} | RCU; 12^{5} | POS; 40^{10} | RAF; 15^{7} | OLA; 42^{10} | BUA1; 33^{12} | PAR2; 5^{3} | JUN; 39^{13} | SLU; 41^{5} | BUA2; 1^{1} | TOA; 34^{4} | LPL; 19^{2} | 15th | 116.25 |
| 2013 | Lincoln Sport Group | Ford Falcon | MDA; 7^{3} | NEU; 10^{7} | JUN; 1^{1} | MDZ; 3^{1} | OLA1; 5^{2} | TRH; 2^{1} | POS; 43^{3} | RAF; 10^{1} | BUA1; 15^{14} | OLA2; 15^{6} | PAR; 45^{5} | SLU; 4^{3} | CMR; 6^{2} | TOA; 13^{7} | TLW; 2^{1} | BUA2; 5^{4} | 2nd | 493.75 |
| 2014 | Werner Competición | Ford Falcon | NEU; 22^{1} | PAR; 21^{15} | JUN; 3^{2} | CCD; 1^{1} | TOA1; 24^{14} | CDU; 21^{12} | TRH; 10^{1} | POS; 20^{5} | AGC; 37^{14} | OLA; 34^{2} | RAF; 21^{6} | SLU; 33^{3} | LPL; 2^{1} | TOA2; 5^{1} | TLW; 24^{3} | BUA; 10^{3} | 9th | 362 |
| 2015 | Werner Competición | Ford Falcon | CCD; 5^{2} | TOA1; 11^{3} | NEU; 22^{13} | VIE; 28^{14} | CDU; 36^{5} | POS; 1^{1} | TRH1; 39^{1} | TRH2; 22^{9} | PAR; 13^{3} | OLA; 17 | RAF; 38^{2} | SLU; 10^{3} | RGA; 25^{12} | TOA2; 6^{2} | CMR; 13^{3} | LPL; 3^{1} | 7th | 371 |
| 2016 | Werner Competición | Ford Falcon | VIE; DNS^{13} | NEU; 2^{1} | TOA1; 4^{1} | CCD; 27^{3} | OLA; 14 | TRH1; 3^{1} | TRH2; 1^{1} | POS; 3^{2} | CDU1; 5^{2} | RAF; 1^{1} | PAR; 2^{1} | SLU; 14^{6} | CDU2; 2^{1} | TOA2; 1^{1} | TLW; 2^{1} | LPL; 30^{3} | 3rd | 646 |
| 2017 | Werner Competición | Ford Falcon | VIE | NEU | OLA | CDU | VMC1 | POS | PAR; 21^{11} | BUA; 12 | TRH; 1 | CCD; 13^{9} | VMC2; 18^{11} | RAF; 13^{6} | TOA; 7^{3} | CMR; 17^{3} | LPL; 17^{4} | | 23rd (Note: Werner was banned from participating in the first 6 rounds of the 2017 season for deliberately crashing into Matías Rossi at the final round of the 2016 season.) | 264.75 |
| 2018 | Werner Competición | Ford Falcon | VIE; 2^{1} | NEU; 15^{5} | SLU; 21^{12} | CDU; 36^{8} | POS; 7^{13} | CCD; 1^{1} | TRH; 7 | RAF; 5^{3} | BUA; 20 | PAR; 21^{13} | VMC; 11^{2} | TOA; 7^{6} | OLA; 3^{1} | SJV; 21^{2} | SNI; 8^{3} | | 4th | 441.5 |
| 2019 | Werner Competición DTA Racing | Ford Falcon | VIE; 3^{1} | NEU1; 3^{2} | CDU; 14^{5} | SLU; 5^{2} | ROS; 15^{7} | RAF1; 10^{3} | TRH; 37^{3} | POS; 5^{3} | CCD; 5^{2} | SJV; 7 | RAF2; 6^{3} | PAR; 6^{3} | SNI; 6^{3} | TOA; 1^{1} | NEU2; 6^{4} | | 3rd | 485.25 |
| 2020 | Werner Competición DTA Racing | Ford Falcon | VIE; DSQ^{DSQ} | NEU; 2^{1} | SNI1; 39^{1} | SNI2; 5^{6} | BUA1; 3^{2} | SNI3; 1^{1} | LPL1; 1^{1} | LPL2; 1^{1} | BUA2; 2^{1} | SJV1; 4^{2} | SJV2; 5^{2} | | | | | | 1st | 389.25 |
| 2021 | Gurí Martínez Competición | Ford Falcon | LPL; 13^{7} | BUA; 30^{1} | SNI1; 1^{1} | CDU; 34^{6} | PAR; 2^{1} | SNI2; 2^{1} | CCD; 40^{3} | SJV1; 26 | SJV2; 8^{4} | POS; 1^{1} | RAF; 23^{14} | SLU; 1^{1} | VIE; 1^{1} | TOA; 7^{4} | SJV3; 9^{2} | | 1st | 647.25 |
| 2022 | Werner Competición | Ford Falcon | VIE; 11^{7} | NEU; 5^{2} | CDU; 19^{8} | TOA1; 41^{7} | TRH; 9^{6} | RAF; 2^{1} | CCD; 38^{7} | POS; 4^{2} | SJV1; 12 | PAR; 3^{2} | SLU; 1^{1} | CMR; 1^{1} | SNI; 2^{1} | TOA2; 10^{8} | SJV2; 5^{3} | | 2nd | 466 |
| 2023 | Werner Competición | Ford Falcon | VIE; 1^{1} | NEU; 4^{2} | TOA1; 4 | ELC; 10^{8} | CDU; 51^{1} | TRH; 21^{15} | RAF1; 4^{2} | POS; 1^{1} | SJV1; 20 | BUA; 10^{13} | SLU; 2^{1} | SNI; 10^{2} | RAF2; 1^{1} | TOA2; 15^{6} | SJV2; 4^{1} | | 1st | 676.5 |
| 2024 | Werner Competición | Ford Mustang S650 | ELC; 16^{1} | VIE; 2^{1} | NEU; 7^{3} | TOA1; 1^{2} | TRH; 37^{3} | CDU; 20^{4} | RAF; 40^{4} | POS; 4^{3} | SJV; 8 | BUA; 44^{10} | SLU; 6^{2} | PAR; 5^{3} | SNI; 1^{1} | TOA2; 1^{1} | LPL; 22^{2} | | 2nd | 464.25 |
| 2025 | Werner Competición | Ford Mustang S650 | VIE; 45^{1} | ELC; 8^{5} | NEU; C^{16} | TOA1; 49 | TRH; 13^{9} | AGC; 1^{1} | POS; 49^{18} | CDU; 13^{5} | SJV; 28 | BUA; 5^{1} | SLU; 44^{16} | SNI; 16^{11} | PAR; 3^{1} | TOA2; 43^{1} | LPL; 2^{1} | | 11th | 310 |
| 2026 | Werner Competición | Ford Mustang S650 | ELC; 32^{5} | VIE; 26^{3} | NEU; 12^{7} | CDU; 14^{5} | TRH; 1^{1} | AGC; 15^{6} | RAF; 21^{11} | POS; 6^{3} | SJV; 19 | PAR; 5^{3} | SLU | SNI | ROS | RCU | LPL | | 5th* | 241.5* |

*Season in progress.

== Notes ==
Sporting positions
| Preceded by Agustín Canapino | Turismo Carretera champion 2020-2021 | Succeeded by José Manuel Urcera |
