= 2019 Súper TC2000 =

Motorsport in Argentina

Seasons
- ← 2018 2020 →

The 2019 Súper TC2000 Championship is the 41st season of Turismo Competición 2000 and the 8th season of Súper TC2000. The series began on April in Autódromo Oscar Cabalén and finished on December in Autódromo Parque Provincia del Neuquén.

== Calendar ==
Round	Circuit	Date
1	(Córdoba Province, Argentina) Autódromo Oscar Cabalén, Alta Gracia	April 7
2	(Río Negro Province) Autódromo Parque Ciudad de General Roca, General Roca	April 28
3	(San Juan Province, Argentina) Circuito San Juan Villicum, Albardón	May 19
4	(Santa Fe Province) Autódromo Municipal Juan Manuel Fangio, Rosario	June 9
5	(Entre Ríos Province) Autódromo Ciudad de Paraná, Paraná	June 30
6	(Salta Province) Autódromo Martín Miguel de Güemes, Salta	July 21
7	(Buenos Aires Province) Autódromo San Nicolás Ciudad, San Nicolás	August 18
8	(San Juan Province, Argentina) Autódromo Eduardo Copello, Quebrada de Zonda	September 15
9	(Mendoza Province) Autódromo Jorge Ángel Pena, San Martín	October 6
10	Autódromo Oscar y Juan Gálvez, Buenos Aires	November 10
11	(Córdoba Province, Argentina) Autódromo Parque Ciudad de Río Cuarto, Río Cuarto	November 24
12	(Neuquén Province) Autódromo Parque Provincia del Neuquén, Centenario	December 15

== Teams and drivers ==
Teams and drivers who have participated in at least one race of the season.

Team	Car	#	Driver	Rounds	Co-driver (200 km)
Renault Sport	Renault Fluence	1	(Argentina) Facundo Ardusso	All	(Argentina) Gabriel Ponce de León
Renault Sport	Renault Fluence	3	(Argentina) Leonel Pernía	All	(Argentina) Damián Fineschi
Renault Sport	Renault Fluence	28	(Argentina) Matías Milla	All	(Argentina) Franco Vivian
Renault Sport	Renault Fluence	29	(Argentina) Facundo Conta	All	(Argentina) Gregorio Conta
Chevrolet YPF	Chevrolet Cruze J400	2	(Argentina) Bernardo Llaver	All	(Argentina) Lucas Colombo Russell
Chevrolet YPF	Chevrolet Cruze J400	30	(Argentina) Tomás Gagliardi Genné	All	(Argentina) Antonino García
Chevrolet YPF	Chevrolet Cruze J400	31	(Argentina) Franco Girolami	9	—N/a
Chevrolet YPF	Chevrolet Cruze J400	64	(Argentina) Bruno Armellini	10–12	(Argentina) Sebastián Peluso
Chevrolet YPF	Chevrolet Cruze J400	86	(Argentina) Agustín Canapino	1–5, 7–12	(Argentina) Franco Girolami
Fiat Racing Team STC2000	Fiat Tipo II	5	(Argentina) Fabián Yannantuoni	All	(Argentina) Juan Bautista De Benedictis
Fiat Racing Team STC2000	Fiat Tipo II	21	(Argentina) Matías Muñoz Marchesi	All	(Argentina) Juan Cruz Álvarez
Fiat Racing Team STC2000	Fiat Tipo II	44	(Argentina) Mariano Werner	All	(Uruguay) Mauricio Lambiris
Honda Racing	Honda Civic X	14	(Argentina) Ricardo Risatti III	All	(Argentina) Martín Chialvo
Honda Racing	Honda Civic X	34	(Argentina) Juan Ángel Rosso	All	(Argentina) Néstor Girolami
Honda Racing	Honda Civic X	51	(Argentina) José Manuel Urcera	All	(Argentina) Emanuel Moriatis
Toyota Gazoo Racing YPF Infinia	Toyota Corolla (E170)	17	(Argentina) Matías Rossi	All	(Uruguay) Santiago Urrutia
Toyota Gazoo Racing YPF Infinia	Toyota Corolla (E170)	27	(Argentina) Mariano Altuna	7–12	(Argentina) Manuel Luque
Toyota Gazoo Racing YPF Infinia	Toyota Corolla (E170)	68	(Argentina) Julián Santero	All	(Argentina) Emiliano Spataro
Citroën Total Racing Súper TC2000 Team	Citroën C4 Lounge	25	(Argentina) Marcelo Ciarrocchi	All	(Argentina) José Manuel Sapag
Citroën Total Racing Súper TC2000 Team	Citroën C4 Lounge	79	(Argentina) Facundo Chapur	1-10	(Argentina) Matías Cravero
Citroën Total Racing Súper TC2000 Team	Citroën C4 Lounge	33	(Argentina) José Manuel Sapag	11–12	—N/a
TS Racing	Chevrolet Cruze J400	67	(Argentina) Nicolás Traut	11	—N/a

== Results and standings ==
Results and standings of the season.

=== Results summary ===
Round			Pole position	Fastest lap	Winning driver	Winning team	Winning car
1		(Argentina) Alta Gracia	(Argentina) Leonel Pernía	(Argentina) Matías Rossi	(Argentina) Leonel Pernía	Renault Sport	Renault Fluence
2		(Argentina) General Roca	(Argentina) Leonel Pernía	(Argentina) Mariano Werner	(Argentina) Leonel Pernía	Renault Sport	Renault Fluence
3		(Argentina) Villicum	(Argentina) Matías Rossi	(Argentina) Matías Rossi	(Argentina) Matías Rossi	Toyota Gazoo Racing YPF Infinia	Toyota Corolla (E170)
4		(Argentina) Rosario	(Argentina) Facundo Ardusso	(Argentina) Facundo Ardusso	(Argentina) Facundo Ardusso	Renault Sport	Renault Fluence
5		(Argentina) Paraná	(Argentina) Leonel Pernía	(Argentina) Julián Santero	(Argentina) Matías Rossi	Toyota Gazoo Racing YPF Infinia	Toyota Corolla (E170)
6		(Argentina) Salta	(Argentina) Matías Rossi	(Argentina) Facundo Ardusso	(Argentina) Matías Rossi	Toyota Gazoo Racing YPF Infinia	Toyota Corolla (E170)
7		(Argentina) San Nicolás	(Argentina) Matías Rossi	(Argentina) Julián Santero	(Argentina) Matías Rossi	Toyota Gazoo Racing YPF Infinia	Toyota Corolla (E170)
8		(Argentina) San Juan	(Argentina) Agustín Canapino	(Argentina) Matías Milla	(Argentina) Matías Milla	Renault Sport	Renault Fluence
9	R1	(Argentina) San Martín	(Argentina) Agustín Canapino	(Argentina) Agustín Canapino	(Argentina) Agustín Canapino	Chevrolet YPF	Chevrolet Cruze J400
9	R2	(Argentina) San Martín		(Argentina) Bernardo Llaver	(Argentina) Agustín Canapino	Chevrolet YPF	Chevrolet Cruze J400
10		(Argentina) Buenos Aires	(Argentina) Facundo Ardusso	(Argentina) Leonel Pernía	(Argentina) Leonel Pernía (Argentina) Damián Fineschi	Renault Sport	Renault Fluence
11		(Argentina) Río Cuarto	(Argentina) Leonel Pernía	(Argentina) Agustín Canapino	(Argentina) Marcelo Ciarrocchi	Citroën Total Racing Súper TC 2000 Team	Citroën C4 Lounge
12		(Argentina) Centenario	(Argentina) Leonel Pernía	(Argentina) Agustín Canapino	(Argentina) Agustín Canapino	Chevrolet YPF	Chevrolet Cruze J400

=== Championship standings ===
Points system

Pos.	1st	2nd	3rd	4th	5th	6th	7th	8th	9th	10th
Qualifying	2									
Super Qualifying	3									
Race	20	15	12	10	8	6	4	3	2	1
200 km race (round 10)	30	25	21	17	14	11	8	5	3	1

Drivers' championship

Pos	Driver	AGC (Córdoba Province, Argentina)	GRO (Río Negro Province)	VIL (San Juan Province, Argentina)	ROS (Santa Fe Province)	PAR (Entre Ríos Province)	SAL (Salta Province)	SNI (Buenos Aires Province)	SJU (San Juan Province, Argentina)	SMM (Mendoza Province)		BUE (Buenos Aires)	RCU (Córdoba Province, Argentina)	NEU (Neuquén Province)	Pts
1	(Argentina) Leonel Pernía	1	1	4	2	3	3	3	8	9	8	1	2	2	190
2	(Argentina) Matías Rossi	6	8	1	4	1	1	1	2	10	5	3	5	4	173
3	(Argentina) Facundo Ardusso	2	2	Ret	1	2	4	5	11†	5	15	5	3	18†	129
4	(Argentina) Julián Santero	3	5	2	10	4	2	2	Ret	13	6	4	6	3	121
5	(Argentina) Agustín Canapino	4	4	Ret	5	15		8	Ret	1	1	Ret	4	1	111
6	(Argentina) Matías Milla	9	6	3	3	7	DSQ	7	1	6	4	2	17	8	106
7	(Argentina) Mariano Werner	8	3	Ret	11	12	5	Ret	6	3	3	15	10	6	60
8	(Argentina) Mariano Altuna							4	4	4	7	10	7	5	47
9	(Argentina) Bernardo Llaver	15	Ret	11†	8	10	Ret	9	DSQ	2	2	7	11	16	44
10	(Argentina) Marcelo Ciarrocchi	DSQ	14	Ret	12	8	9	11	Ret	17	12	6	1	7	40
11	(Argentina) Facundo Chapur	7	11	Ret	6	6	Ret	DSQ	5	7	9	12			30
12	(Argentina) Matías Muñoz Marchesi	13	Ret	10	Ret	9	11†	6	3	16	17†	8	15	9	28
13	(Argentina) Tomás Gagliardi Genné	5	12	7	15	11	Ret	10	7	DSQ	14	9	18	11	21
14	(Argentina) Ricardo Risatti III	12	10	6	9	5	Ret	Ret	9	12	16	11	Ret	12	19
15	(Argentina) José Manuel Urcera	10	9	5	DSQ	16†	6	Ret	Ret	11	11	Ret	9	13	19
16	(Argentina) Facundo Conta	11	15	8	7	14	7	DSQ	Ret	14	Ret	14	8	Ret	14
17	(Argentina) Fabián Yannantuoni	16	7	Ret	14	13	8	Ret	Ret	Ret	10	16	16	15	8
18	(Argentina) Juan Ángel Rosso	14	13	9	13	17†	10	12	10	15	13	13	13	14	4
19	(Argentina) Franco Girolami									8	18†				3
Guest drivers ineligible for points
	(Argentina) Damián Fineschi											1			
	(Argentina) Franco Vivian											2			
	(Uruguay) Santiago Urrutia											3			
	(Argentina) Emiliano Spataro											4			
	(Argentina) Gabriel Ponce de León											5			
	(Argentina) José Manuel Sapag											6			
	(Argentina) Lucas Colombo Russell											7			
	(Argentina) Juan Cruz Álvarez											8			
	(Argentina) Antonino García											9			
	(Argentina) Bruno Armellini											17	14	10	
	(Argentina) Manuel Luque											10			
	(Argentina) Martín Chialvo											11			
	(Argentina) José Manuel Sapag												12	17	
	(Argentina) Matías Cravero											12			
	(Argentina) Néstor Girolami											13			
	(Argentina) Gregorio Conta											14			
	(Uruguay) Mauricio Lambiris											15			
	(Argentina) Juan Bautista De Benedictis											16			
	(Argentina) Sebastián Peluso											17			
	(Argentina) Franco Girolami											Ret			
	(Argentina) Emanuel Moriatis											Ret			
	(Argentina) Nicolás Traut												DNS		
Pos	Driver	AGC (Córdoba Province, Argentina)	GRO (Río Negro Province)	VIL (San Juan Province, Argentina)	ROS (Santa Fe Province)	PAR (Entre Ríos Province)	SAL (Salta Province)	SNI (Buenos Aires Province)	SJU (San Juan Province, Argentina)	SMM (Mendoza Province)		BUE (Buenos Aires)	RCU (Córdoba Province, Argentina)	NEU (Neuquén Province)	Pts
