= Autódromo Parque Provincia del Neuquén =

- Full Circuit (2009–present)
- Location: Centenario, Neuquén, Argentina
- Coordinates: 38°51′17″S 68°09′20″W
- Broke ground: August 2007; 18 years ago
- Opened: 6 September 2009; 16 years ago
- Former names: Autódromo de Centenario
- Major events: Current: Turismo Carretera (2010–2011, 2013–2020, 2022–present); Former: TC2000 (2009–2010, 2019, 2022); Turismo Nacional (2010, 2014, 2018–2019, 2022); Top Race V6 (2013, 2022); TC Mouras (2017–2019, 2022); TC Pick Up (2019, 2022)

Full Circuit (2009–present)
- Length: 4.319 km (2.684 mi)
- Turns: 8
- Race lap record: 1:28.034 ( (Argentina) Bernardo Llaver, Chevrolet Cruze, 2022, TC2000)

Autódromo Parque Provincia del Neuquén is a 4.319 km (2.684 mi) motorsports circuit located near Centenario, Neuquén, Argentina. The circuit was officially opened on 6 September 2009. The circuit has hosted Argentine national championships, such as Turismo Carretera and TC2000 Championship.

== Events ==
Current

- March: Turismo Carretera, Turismo Carretera Pista, Turismo Carretera 2000, Fórmula 2 Argentina

Former

- Fórmula Nacional Argentina (2009–2010, 2019, 2022)
- TC2000 (2009–2010, 2019, 2022)
- TC Mouras (2017–2019, 2022)
- TC Pick Up (2019, 2022)
- Top Race V6 (2013, 2022)
- Turismo Nacional (2010, 2014, 2018–2019, 2022)

== Lap records ==
As of October 2022, the fastest official race lap records at the Autódromo Parque Provincia del Neuquén are listed as:

Category	Time	Driver	Vehicle	Event
Full Circuit (2009–present): 4.319 km (2.684 mi)
TC2000	1:28.034	Bernardo Llaver	Chevrolet Cruze	2022 Neuquén TC2000 round
Turismo Carretera	1:29.238	Juan Cruz Benvenuti	Torino Cherokee	2020 Neuquén Turismo Carretera round
Formula Renault 2.0	1:30.794	Guido Moggia	Tito F4-A	2019 Neuquén Formula Renault Argentina round
TC Pick Up	1:33.622	Mariano Werner	Toyota Hilux	2022 Neuquén TC Pick Up round
Turismo Nacional Clase 3	1:34.747	Nicolás Montanari	Chevrolet Cruze	2022 Neuquén Turismo Nacional round
Turismo Nacional Clase 2	1:38.418	Alejandro Torrisi	Nissan March	2022 Neuquén Turismo Nacional round
