= Autódromo Rosamonte =

Motorsport venue in Argentina

- Full Circuit (2007–present)
- Location: Posadas, Argentina
- Coordinates: 27°26′25″S 55°55′34″W
- Operator: Misiones Automobile Club
- Opened: 1980
- Former names: Autódromo Ciudad de Posadas
- Major events: Current: TCR South America (2026); Turismo Carretera (2007–2019, 2021–present); Former: Turismo Nacional (1995, 2008–2013, 2015–2018, 2023); TC Pick Up (2022); Top Race V6 (2007); TC2000 (1994–1997, 1999); F3 Sudamericana (1993–1999); SASTC (1998)

Full Circuit (2007–present)
- Length: 4.370 km (2.715 mi)
- Turns: 11
- Race lap record: 1:31.934 ( (Argentina) Otto Fritzler, Toyota Camry TC, 2025, TC)

Original Circuit (1980–2006)
- Length: 2.472 km (1.536 mi)
- Turns: 9
- Race lap record: 0:58.237 ( (Brazil) Hoover Orsi, Dallara F394, 1999, F3)

The Autódromo Rosamonte, also known as the Autódromo Ciudad de Posadas, is a race track situated in Argentina, located on the outskirts of the City of Posadas, in the Province of Misiones. It was founded in 1980 and since its major remodeling in 2007, it has become the most crucial racing circuit in the province, relegating the Ciudad de Oberá Autodrome in terms of relevance, beyond its strategic location. The circuit is managed by the Misiones Automobile Club and is named after the yerbatero company -íctica Rosamonte, the main producer of Yerba mate in the Province and main sponsor of various sports activities.

It has a total length of 4.370 km (2.715 mi) in its main extension. It is characterized by a layout that adopts the qualities of the terrain of the Province of Misiones, with slopes and climbs that propose high demands to those who compete on its layout, especially in the contracurve. called "Carousel", a fast contracurve located on a slope, where the cars are required to the maximum to avoid forgetfulness.

The remodeling of the circuit was carried out with a view to the organization of the Rosamonte Highway Tourism Grand Prix and was finally inaugurated in 2007. On that occasion, the victory went to the driver from Salto, Guillermo Ortelli, with a Chevrolet Chevy. In addition to Turismo Carretera, this racetrack is the venue for the grand prizes of two of the other three most important categories in the Argentine Republic: Top Race V6 and Turismo Nacional.

== History ==
The Rosamonte Autodrome was inaugurated in 1980 and began as a circuit for zonal competitions in the Province of Misiones. The layout is located in the San Isidro neighborhood, in Posadas, capital of the Province. It was reserved for that kind of racing, until the ambitious plan to renovate it began in 2006, building a new circuit with nine curves (three to the right and six to the left) on its original layout. Its inauguration in 2007 marked a milestone within national motorsports, since for the first time, this racetrack was located at the top of the ranking of importance in the northeast region, thanks to the arrival of Turismo Carretera., a category considered the most important in Argentina. In this way, for the first time, the northeast region could enjoy the passage of that mentioned category and at the same time, the north of the country began to have two important racetracks, together with the Autódromo Martín Miguel de Güemes in the City of Salta. To these two, would be added a few years later, the Autódromo Termas de Río Hondo in the Province of Santiago del Estero.

This circuit is not characterized by having clear areas for overtaking, in addition to presenting a stuck drawing where the pilots must deploy their potential to the maximum to establish a good classification, due to the little overtaking space that exists in competition. The characteristic undulations of the terrain of the Province of Misiones are adopted by this route, putting together a circuit with slopes and climbs that require maximum concentration from its pilots. One of the most complicated sections to complete is a curve and counter-curve located on a slope, called the "Carousel", in which the pilots are required to be able to travel it at high speed. A minimal error in the Carousel would lead to a mistake at high speed.

=== Location ===
The circuit is located in the San Isidro neighborhood of the City of Posadas. To get there, you can enter by taking National Route 12, and from there choose to enter directly on Avenida Cabo de Hornos, or take Provincial Route 123 or Avenida Mario del Tránsito Cocomarola, and then enter through Cabo de Hornos. The access openings are ordered as follows:

North Access: After entering Route 12, take Avenida Mario del Tránsito Cocomarola, until Avenida Cabo de Hornos. East Access: After entering Route 12, it is accessed directly by Avenida Cabo de Hornos. Northeast Access: After entering Route 12, take Provincial Route 123, up to Avenida Cabo de Hornos.

== Lap records ==
As of October 2026, the fastest official race lap records at the Autódromo Rosamonte are listed as:

| Category | Time | Driver | Vehicle | Event |
Full Circuit (2007–present): 4.370 km (2.715 mi)
| Turismo Carretera | 1:31.934 | Otto Fritzler | Toyota Camry TC | 2025 Posadas Turismo Carretera round |
| TCR Touring Car | 1:33.855 | Néstor Girolami | Hyundai Elantra N TCR (2024) | 2026 Posadas TCR South America round |
| Formula Renault 2.0 | 1:36.157 | Ignacio Monti | Tito F4-A | 2026 Posadas Fórmula 2 Argentina round |
| TC Pick Up | 1:40.291 | Valentín Aguirre | Volkswagen Amarok | 2022 Posadas TC Pick Up round |
Original Circuit (1980–2006): 2.472 km (1.536 mi)
| Formula Three | 0:58.237 | Hoover Orsi | Dallara F394 | 1999 Posadas F3 Sudamericana round |
| TC2000 | 1:05.567 | Henry Martin | Ford Escort VI | 1997 Posadas TC2000 round |
| Super Touring | 1:06.719 | Oscar Larrauri | BMW 320i | 1998 Posadas SASTC round |
