= Autódromo Juan Manuel Fangio =

Circuit

- Full Circuit with Chicane (1972–present)
- Location: Balcarce, Buenos Aires Province
- Coordinates: 37°52′58.9″S 58°16′1.4″W
- Opened: 16 January 1972; 54 years ago
- Major events: Former: TC Pick Up (2026); Former: Turismo Carretera (1984–2002, 2004–2011); Top Race V6 (1998, 2000, 2005–2007); Turismo Nacional (1973–1974, 1977, 1979, 1983, 1985, 1996, 1998, 2001); TC2000 (1982–1984, 1986, 1988, 1990)

Full Circuit with Chicane (1972–present)
- Length: 4.592 km (2.853 mi)
- Turns: 19
- Race lap record: 1:42.393 ( (Argentina) José Hernán Palazzo, Toyota Hilux VIII, 2026, TCPK)

Full Circuit (1972–present)
- Length: 4.522 km (2.810 mi)
- Turns: 16
- Race lap record: 1:34.070 ( (Italy) Carlo Facetti, Alfa Romeo T33/3, 1972, Group 6)

Autódromo Juan Manuel Fangio is a 4.592 km (2.853 mi) motorsports circuit located near Balcarce, Argentina. The track was named after five-time Formula One World Champion Juan Manuel Fangio, who was born in Balcarce.

== History ==
The circuit was inaugurated in January 1972 with a race for Group 6 sport prototypes, and was won by Englishman John Hine in a Chevron B19.

In 2011, Guido Falaschi was fatally injured in a multi-car crash during a Turismo Carretera event. After this, the circuit was abandoned by Argentina's top national championships and lay mostly dormant aside from a domestic rallycross round in 2019. In May 2023, the Buenos Aires Province government allocated AR$580 million to upgrading the circuit to meet FIA standards.

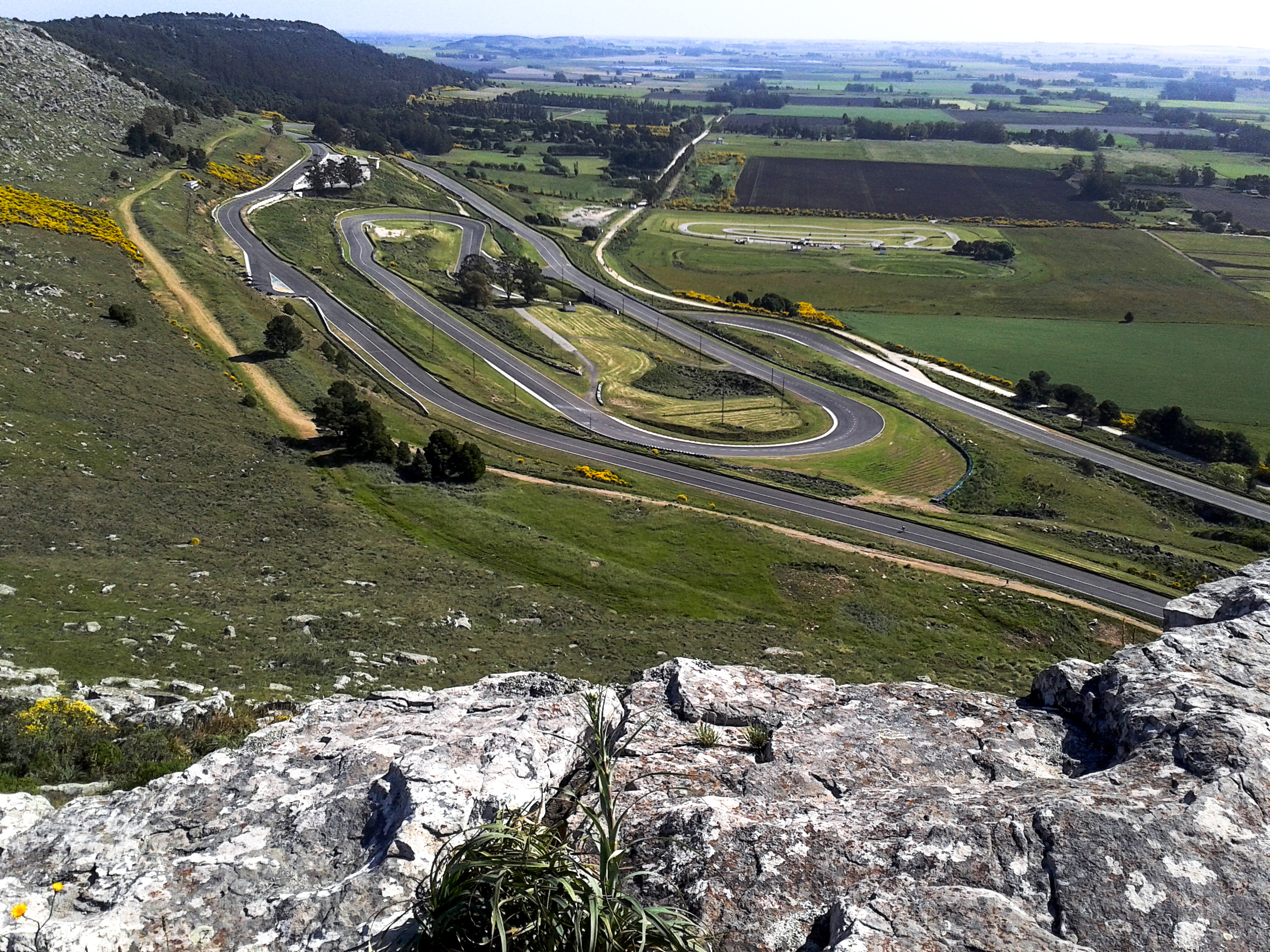
View of Autodromo JM Fangio

== Lap records ==
As of September 2026, the fastest official race lap records at the Autódromo Juan Manuel Fangio are listed as:

Category	Time	Driver	Vehicle	Event
Full Circuit with Chicane (1972–present): 4.592 km (2.853 mi)
TC Pick Up	1:42.393	José Hernán Palazzo	Toyota Hilux VIII	2026 Balcarce TC Pick Up round
Turismo Carretera	1:46.305	Omar Martínez	Ford Falcon	2010 Balcarce Turismo Carretera round
Full Circuit (1972–present): 4.522 km (2.810 mi)
Group 6	1:34.070	Carlo Facetti	Alfa Romeo T33/3	1972 Carrera Sports de Balcarce
Formula Three	1:38.210	Oscar Larrauri	Martini MK27	1979 Gran Premio de Balcarce
