= Circuito San Juan Villicum =

Motorsport venue in Argentina

- Grand Prix Circuit (2018–present)
- Location: Albardón, San Juan, Argentina
- Coordinates: 31°23′55″S 68°34′03″W
- Broke ground: October 2016; 9 years ago
- Opened: 12 October 2018; 7 years ago
- Architect: Leonardo Stella
- Major events: Current: Turismo Carretera (2018–present); Turismo Nacional (2020–2021, 2024–present); Former: World SBK (2018–2019, 2021–2022); TCR South America (2022, 2024–2025); TC2000 (2019, 2021–2022, 2024); TC Pick Up (2021, 2024); Top Race V6 (2021–2022)
- Website: https://www.circuitosanjuanvillicum.ar

Grand Prix Circuit (2018–present)
- Length: 4.276 km (2.657 mi)
- Turns: 17
- Race lap record: 1:37.277 ( (United Kingdom) Jonathan Rea, Kawasaki Ninja ZX-10RR, 2022, World SBK)

Turismo Carretera Circuit (2019–present)
- Length: 4.254 km (2.643 mi)
- Turns: 14
- Race lap record: 1:41.714 ( (Argentina) Santiago Mangoni, Chevrolet Camaro ZL1, 2025, TC)

The Circuito San Juan Villicum is a motor sports racing circuit located in the San Juan Province of Argentina close to National Route 40. The circuit is anti-clockwise with a length of 4.276 km (2.657 mi). There are seven turns to the right and ten left. The undulating contours were artificially created by moving more than 700,000 cubic meters of earth.

The track was designed by Leonardo Stella, a specialist architect in autodromes, and look for a degree of approval A1.

The inaugural racing event was on October 14, 2018 with the World Superbike Championship for motorcycles. The first automobile race was on November 18 of the same year with the Turismo Carretera and Súper TC 2000.

== Events ==
Current

- May: Turismo Nacional
- June: Latin America Talent Cup
- August: Turismo Carretera, Turismo Nacional, Turismo Carretera Pista, Fórmula 2 Argentina
- September: GP3 Chile
- November: GP3 Chile

Former

- Formula Renault Argentina (2019, 2021)
- Superbike World Championship (2018–2019, 2021–2022)
- Supersport World Championship (2018–2019, 2021–2022)
- TC Mouras (2021)
- TC Pick Up (2021, 2024)
- TC Pista Pick Up (2024)
- TC2000 Championship (2019, 2021–2022, 2024)
- TCR South America Touring Car Championship (2022, 2024–2025)
- Top Race V6 (2021–2022)
- Turismo Carretera 2000 (2025)

== Lap records ==
As of August 2026, the fastest official race lap records at the Circuito San Juan Villicum are listed as:

Category	Time	Driver	Vehicle	Event
Grand Prix Circuit (2018–present): 4.276 km (2.657 mi)
World SBK	1:37.277	Jonathan Rea	Kawasaki Ninja ZX-10RR	2022 San Juan Villicum World SBK round
World SSP	1:41.693	Raffaele De Rosa	Ducati Panigale V2	2022 San Juan Villicum World SSP round
TCR Touring Car	1:47.772	Juan Ángel Rosso	Honda Civic Type R TCR (FK8)	2022 San Juan Villicum TCR South America round
Súper TC2000	1:48.631	Agustín Canapino	Toyota Corolla Mk.12	2021 San Juan Villicum Súper TC2000 round
Turismo Carretera	1:49.736	Mariano Werner	Ford Falcon TC	2018 San Juan Villicum Turismo Carretera round
Formula Renault 2.0	1:50.527	Mateo Polakovich	Tito F4-A	2019 San Juan Villicum Formula Renault Argentina round
Turismo Carretera Circuit (2019–present): 4.254 km (2.643 mi)
Turismo Carretera	1:41.714	Santiago Mangoni	Chevrolet Camaro ZL1	2025 San Juan Villicum Turismo Carretera round
TC2000	1:43.098	Agustín Canapino	Chevrolet Cruze	2022 San Juan Villicum TC2000 round
TCR Touring Car	1:43.110	Leonel Pernía	Honda Civic Type R TCR (FL5)	2025 San Juan Villicum TCR South America round
Turismo Carretera 2000	1:44.574	Bernardo Llaver	Honda All New Civic	2025 San Juan Villicum Turismo Carretera 2000 round
TC Pick Up	1:47.229	Mariano Werner	Toyota Hilux	2024 San Juan Villicum TC Pick Up round
Formula Renault 2.0	1:48.802	Franco Ledesma	Tito F4-A	2026 San Juan Villicum Fórmula 2 Argentina round
Turismo Nacional Clase 3	1:49.742	Rodrigo Lugón	Volkswagen Virtus	2025 San Juan Villicum Turismo Nacional round
Top Race V6	1:49.772	Stéfano Di Palma	Fiat Cronos	2021 San Juan Villicum Top Race V6 round
Top Race Series	1:51.837	Ariel Persia	Mercedes-Benz CLA	2022 San Juan Villicum Top Race Series round
Turismo Nacional Clase 2	1:53.195	Renzo Blotta	Toyota Etios	2025 San Juan Villicum Turismo Nacional round
