= Autódromo Hermanos Emiliozzi =

- Full Circuit (1998–present)
- Location: Olavarría, Buenos Aires, Argentina
- Coordinates: 36°51′34.4″S 60°15′5.9″W
- Opened: 1998
- Former names: Autódromo Sudamericano de Olavarría (1998–2008)
- Major events: Current: TC2000 (1998–1999, 2005–2006, 2026); Former: Top Race V6 (2001, 2003–2005, 2007, 2011–2012, 2015, 2019, 2021–2024); Turismo Carretera (1998–2006, 2008–2018); Turismo Nacional (1998, 2000–2001, 2003, 2005–2006, 2009, 2014, 2016); SASTC (1998–2000)

Full Circuit (1998–present)
- Length: 5.079 km (3.156 mi)
- Turns: 9
- Race lap record: 1:52.423 ( (Argentina) Omar Martínez, Honda Civic VI, 1998, TC2000)

Turismo Carretera Circuit (1998–present)
- Length: 4.117 km (2.558 mi)
- Turns: 6
- Race lap record: 1:20.456 ( (Argentina) Mathías Nolesi, Ford Falcon TC, 2015, TC)

Turismo Nacional Circuit (2014–present)
- Length: 4.313 km (2.680 mi)
- Turns: 9

No.5 Circuit (1998–present)
- Length: 3.679 km (2.286 mi)
- Turns: 7
- Race lap record: 1:25.933 ( (Argentina) Marcelo Bugliotti, Honda Civic VI, 1999, TC2000)

Autódromo Hermanos Emiliozzi (formerly known as Autódromo Sudamericano de Olavarría until 2008) is a 5.079 km (3.156 mi) motor sports circuit located near Olavarría, Argentina. The circuit was opened in 1998 and is notable for its minimal elevation change (being constructed on a flat, grassy plain) and its very long (~1 km) main straight.

== Gallery ==
Full Circuit (1998–present)

Turismo Nacional Circuit (2014–present)

Turismo Carretera Circuit (1998–present)

No.5 Circuit (1998–present)

== Lap records ==
As of August 2015, the fastest official race lap records at the Autódromo Hermanos Emiliozzi are listed as:

| Category | Time | Driver | Vehicle | Event |
Full Circuit (1998–present): 5.079 km (3.156 mi)
| TC2000 | 1:52.423 | Omar Martínez | Honda Civic VI | 1998 Olavarría TC2000 round |
Turismo Carretera Circuit (1998–present): 4.117 km (2.558 mi)
| Turismo Carretera | 1:20.456 | Mathías Nolesi | Ford Falcon TC | 2015 Olavarría Turismo Carretera round |
No.5 Circuit (1974–present): 3.679 km (2.286 mi)
| TC2000 | 1:25.933 | Marcelo Bugliotti | Honda Civic VI | 1999 Olavarría TC2000 round |
