= Autódromo Parque Ciudad de Río Cuarto =

- Long Circuit (2003–2025)
- Location: Río Cuarto, Córdoba, Argentina
- Coordinates: 33°10′39.5″S 64°21′58.7″W
- Opened: 26 August 1959; 67 years ago
- Major events: Current: Turismo Carretera (1994–2012, 2026); Turismo Nacional (1972–1973, 1975–1978, 1985–1986, 1988, 1990–1994, 1996, 1998, 2000, 2006–2009, 2011–2012, 2018, 2025–present); Former: TCR South America (2021); TC Pick Up (2019, 2022, 2025); TC2000 (1979–1980, 1982–1988, 1990–1993, 1995–2004, 2012, 2019, 2021, 2023–2024); Top Race V6 (2006, 2015–2020, 2022–2024); TC Mouras (2019, 2022); Formula 3 Sudamericana (1991–1992, 1994, 1996, 1998–2001)

Medium Circuit (1959–present)
- Length: 3.313 km (2.059 mi)
- Turns: 7
- Race lap record: 1:02.900 ( (Brazil) João Paulo de Oliveira, Dallara F394, 2000, F3)

Long Circuit (2003–2025)
- Length: 4.047 km (2.515 mi)
- Turns: 11
- Race lap record: 1:27.092 ( (Argentina) José María López, Chevrolet Chevy, 2012, TC)

Long Circuit (2026)
- Length: 3.646 km (2.266 mi)
- Turns: 9
- Race lap record: 1.20.739 ( (Argentina) Otto Fritzler, Mercedes-AMG CLE 53 (C236), 2026, TC)

Autódromo Parque Ciudad de Río Cuarto is a motorsports circuit located near Río Cuarto, Argentina. It has hosted events in the Turismo Carretera series. It is one of the most important sporting arenas in the Province of Cordoba Argentina, next to the Autódromo Oscar Cabalén, the other Cordovan stage located in the town of Alta Gracia. It is administered by the Automobile Club of Rio Cuarto.

== Events ==
Current

- July: Turismo Pista, Turismo Carretera 2000
- September: Turismo Nacional
- November: Turismo Carretera, Turismo Carretera Pista

Former

- Formula 3 Sudamericana (1991–1992, 1994, 1996, 1998–2001)
- South American Super Touring Car Championship (1999)
- TC Mouras (2019, 2022)
- TC Pick Up (2019, 2022, 2025)
- TC Pista Mouras (2019, 2022)
- TC Pista Pick Up (2025)
- TC2000 Championship (1979–1980, 1982–1988, 1990–1993, 1995–2004, 2012, 2019, 2021, 2023–2024)
- TCR South America Touring Car Championship (2021)
- Top Race V6 (2006, 2015–2020, 2022–2024)

== Lap records ==
As of November 2026, the fastest official race lap records at the Autódromo Parque Ciudad de Río Cuarto are listed as:

Category	Time	Driver	Vehicle	Event
Medium Circuit (1959–present): 3.313 km (2.059 mi)
Formula Three	1:02.900	João Paulo de Oliveira	Dallara F394	2000 Río Cuarto F3 Sudamericana round
Súper TC2000	1:08.996	Ricardo Risatti	Honda Civic IX	2012 Río Cuarto Súper TC2000 round
TC Pick Up	1:09.031	Tomás Abdala	Ford Ranger	2025 Río Cuarto TC Pick Up round
Formula Renault 2.0	1:09.251	Emiliano Marino	Tito F4-A	2015 Río Cuarto Formula Renault Argentina round
TC Mouras	1:10.671	Marcos Landa	Torino Cherokee	2019 Río Cuarto TC Mouras round
TCR Touring Car	1:10.752	Pepe Oriola	Honda Civic Type R TCR (FK8)	2021 Río Cuarto TCR South America round
Super Touring	1:13.608	Cacá Bueno	Peugeot 406	1999 Río Cuarto SASTC round
Long Circuit (2003–2025): 4.047 km (2.515 mi)
Turismo Carretera	1:27.092	José María López	Chevrolet Chevy	2012 Río Cuarto Turismo Carretera round
TC2000	1:32.242	Nelson García	Ford Focus I	2004 Río Cuarto TC2000 round
Long Circuit (2026): 3.646 km (2.266 mi)
Turismo Carretera	1.20.739	Otto Fritzler	Mercedes-AMG CLE 53 (C236)	2026 Turismo Carretera Río Cuarto round
TC Pista	1.22.364	Bautista Damiani	Chevrolet Camaro	2026 TC Pista Río Cuarto round
