= Autódromo Luis Rubén Di Palma =

Motorsport circuit

- Full Circuit (1998–present)
- Location: Mar de Ajó, Buenos Aires Province, Argentina
- Coordinates: 36°42′29″S 56°43′05″W
- Opened: 8 February 1998; 28 years ago
- Major events: Former: TC Mouras (2014–2017); Top Race V6 (1999, 2003, 2005, 2008, 2012, 2014); Turismo Carretera (1998–2000, 2002–2013); Turismo Nacional (1998–2000, 2006); TC2000 (2001); F3 Sudamericana (2001); SASTC (1998)

Full Circuit (1998–present)
- Length: 4.696 km (2.918 mi)
- Turns: 10
- Race lap record: 1:39.673 ( (Argentina) Lionel Ugalde, Ford Falcon TC, 2011, TC)

Short Circuit (1998–present)
- Length: 3.490 km (2.169 mi)
- Turns: 6
- Race lap record: 1:14.884 ( (Brazil) Juliano Moro, Dallara F301, 2001, F3)

Autódromo Luis Rubén Di Palma is a 4.696 km (2.918 mi) motorsports circuit located in Mar de Ajó, Argentina. The circuit was inaugurated on 8 February 1998 with Turismo Carretera race, and it was named in honour of Luis Rubén Di Palma. The circuit has hosted mainly national championships. But it has also hosted some continental championship events, Formula 3 Sudamericana in 2001, and South American Super Touring Car Championship in 1998.

== Lap records ==
As of February 2011, the fastest official race lap records at the Autódromo Luis Rubén Di Palma are listed as:

Category	Time	Driver	Vehicle	Event
Full Circuit (1998–present): 4.696 km (2.918 mi)
Turismo Carretera	1:39.673	Lionel Ugalde	Ford Falcon TC	2011 Mar de Ajó Turismo Carretera round
TC2000	1:57.521	Oscar Larrauri	Honda Civic VI	2001 Mar de Ajó TC2000 round
Short Circuit (1998–present): 3.490 km (2.169 mi)
Formula Three	1:14.884	Juliano Moro	Dallara F301	2001 Mar de Ajó F3 Sudamericana round
Super Touring	1:25.257	Oscar Larrauri	BMW 320i	1998 Mar de Ajó SASTC round
