= Autódromo San Nicolás =

Autódromo Juan María Traverso
- Location: San Nicolás de los Arroyos, Buenos Aires Province, Argentina
- Coordinates: 33°24′00″S 60°12′13″W
- Opened: 7 October 2018; 7 years ago
- Former names: Autódromo San Nicolás Ciudad (October 2018–October 2022)
- Major events: Current: Turismo Carretera (2018–present); TC2000 (2018–2019, 2021–2024, 2026); Turismo Nacional (2019, 2021–2024, 2026); Top Race V6 (2019, 2021, 2023, 2025–present); Turismo Pista (2019, 2021–2022, 2026); Former: TC Pick Up (2020, 2022, 2025); TC Mouras (2020, 2022)

Full Circuit (2018–present)
- Length: 4.000 km (2.485 mi)
- Turns: 9
- Race lap record: 1:26.728 ( (Argentina) Agustín Canapino, Chevrolet Cruze, 2018, Súper TC2000)

Oval Circuit (2018–present)
- Length: 2.414 km (1.500 mi)
- Turns: 4

Autódromo San Nicolás, officially called the Autódromo Juan María Traverso is a 4.000 km (2.485 mi) motorsports circuit located in San Nicolás de los Arroyos, Argentina. The circuit was inaugurated on 7 October 2018. It has hosted national events, such as Turismo Carretera, TC2000 Championship and Turismo Nacional.

== Events ==
Current

- May: La Gran Carrera del Año
- June: TC2000 Championship, Top Race V6, Fórmula Nacional Argentina, Moto4 Latin Cup
- August: Turismo Pista Carrera de los 300 Pilotos, Turismo Carretera 2000
- October: Turismo Carretera, Turismo Carretera Pista, Fórmula 2 Argentina
- November: Turismo Nacional

Former

- TC Mouras (2020, 2022)
- TC Pick Up (2020, 2022, 2025)
- TC Pista Mouras (2020, 2022)
- TC Pista Pick Up (2025)
- Top Race V6 (2019, 2021, 2023, 2025)

== Lap records ==
As of August 2025, the fastest official race lap records at the Autódromo Juan María Traverso are listed as:

Category	Time	Driver	Vehicle	Event
Full Circuit (2018–present): 4.000 km (2.485 mi)
Súper TC2000	1:26.728	Agustín Canapino	Chevrolet Cruze	2018 San Nicolas Súper TC2000 round
Turismo Carretera	1:27.900	Julián Santero	Ford Falcon TC	2021 2nd San Nicolas Turismo Carretera round
Formula Renault 2.0	1:29.879	Guido Moggia	Tito F4-A	2018 San Nicolas Formula Renault Argentina round
TC Pick Up	1:31.564	Germán Todino	Toyota Hilux	2025 San Nicolas TC Pick Up round
