= Autódromo Martín Miguel de Güemes =

Motor racing track in Salta, Salta Province, Argentina

- Full Circuit (2003–present)
- Location: Salta, Salta Province, Argentina
- Coordinates: 24°46′55″S 65°22′32″W
- Owner: Auto Club Salta
- Operator: Auto Club Salta
- Opened: 18 August 1974; 51 years ago
- Major events: Current: TC2000 Championship (1986, 1994, 2002–2003, 2008, 2012, 2019, 2025–present); Former: Turismo Carretera (1978, 2003–2004, 2006, 2008, 2010); Top Race V6 (2000, 2003–2012, 2016–2019); Turismo Nacional (1976, 1997–2001, 2003–2004, 2008)

Full Circuit (2003–present)
- Length: 4.106 km (2.551 mi)
- Turns: 11
- Race lap record: 1:32.638 ( (Argentina) Franco Vivian, Chevrolet Tracker, 2026, TC2000)

Original Circuit (1974–present)
- Length: 3.409 km (2.118 mi)
- Turns: 8
- Race lap record: 1:09.418 ( (Argentina) Gianfranco Collino, Tito F4-A, 2012, Formula Renault 2.0)

TC2000 Circuit (2002)
- Length: 2.830 km (1.758 mi)
- Turns: 7
- Race lap record: 1:13.137 ( (Argentina) Fabián Yannantuoni, Honda Civic VI, 2002, TC2000)

Autódromo Martín Miguel de Güemes is a 4.106 km (2.551 mi) motorsports circuit located on the 8 km (5.0 mi) east of Salta. The circuit has hosted national events including as the Turismo Carretera, TC2000 Championship, Top Race V6 and Turismo Nacional, especially in the 1990s and the 2000s.

The circuit was built in 1974 by the Auto Club Salta, and renovated in 2003. It was named after Martín Miguel de Güemes, a local military hero born in that city.

== Events ==
Current

- May: TC2000 Championship, Fiat Competizione

Former

- Formula Renault 2.0 Argentina (2008, 2012, 2019)
- Top Race V6 (2000, 2003–2012, 2016–2019)
- Turismo Nacional (1976, 1997–2001, 2003–2004, 2008)
- Turismo Carretera (1978, 2003–2004, 2006, 2008, 2010)

== Lap records ==
As of May 2026, the fastest official race lap records at the Autódromo Martín Miguel de Güemes are listed as:

Category	Time	Driver	Vehicle	Event
Full Circuit (2003–present): 4.106 km (2.551 mi)
TC2000	1:32.638	Franco Vivian	Chevrolet Tracker	2026 Salta TC2000 round
Turismo Carretera	1:32.831	Gabriel Ponce de León	Ford Falcon TC	2010 Salta Turismo Carretera round
Original Circuit (1974–present): 3.409 km (2.118 mi)
Formula Renault 2.0	1:09.418	Gianfranco Collino	Tito F4-A	2012 Salta Formula Renault 2.0 Argentina round
TC2000	1:18.802	Marcelo Ciarrocchi	Toyota Corolla Cross GR-S	2025 Salta TC2000 round
TC2000 Circuit (2002): 2.830 km (1.758 mi)
TC2000	1:13.137	Fabián Yannantuoni	Honda Civic VI	2002 Salta TC2000 round
