= Henry Martin (racing driver) =

Argentine racing driver (born 1965)

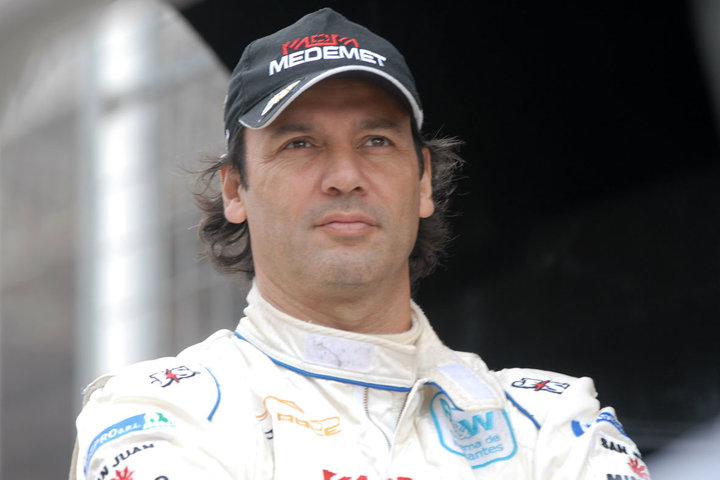
Henry Martin in 2013

Henry Rubén Antonio Martin (born 1965-07-25 in San Juan) is an Argentine racing driver. He has run in different series, with major success in Turismo Carretera, TRV6 and TC 2000.

== Career ==
- 1979: Championship Sudamericano Júnior
- 1981: Championship Sudamericano of Karting, Campeón Argentino de Karting Seniors
- 1982: Championship Panamericano Señor (Chile)
- 1985: Fórmula Renault Cuyana
- 1986: Argentine Formula Renault
- 1987: Argentine Formula Renault
- 1988: Argentine Formula Renault
- 1989: Argentine Formula Renault
- 1990: TC2000 (Renault Fuego), Fórmula 2 Argentina, Formula Three Sudamericana (Reynard / VW)
- 1991: Argentine Formula Renault
- 1992: Argentine Formula Renault, Turismo Carretera (coupé Dodge)
- 1993: TC2000 (Ford Sierra XR4), Turismo Carretera (Coupé Dodge), Supercart (Ford Falcon)
- 1994: TC2000 (Renault Fuego), Supercart (Ford Falcon), Formula Three Sudamericana (Ralt / VW)
- 1995: TC2000 (Ford Escort Ghía), Supercart (Ford Falcon)
- 1996: Formula Three Sudamericana (Dallara Fiat)
- 1997: TC2000 (Ford Escort Zetec), (Champion)
- 1998: TC2000 (Ford Escort Zetec)
- 1999: TC2000 (Ford Escort Zetec)
- 2000: TC2000 (Ford Escort Zetec), subcampeón
- 2001: Turismo Carretera (Ford Falcon), TRV6
- 2002: Turismo Carretera (Ford Falcon), TRV6
- 2003: Turismo Carretera, TRV6
- 2004: TRV6 - Turismo Carretera (Ford Falcon), 200 km of Buenos Aires TC2000 with Peugeot
- 2005: Turismo Carretera (Ford Falcon) - TRV6
- 2006: TRV6, 200 km of Buenos Aires TC2000 (VW Bora)
- 2007: TC2000 (Honda Civic07) Honda Lubrax Team
- 2008: TRV6, Turismo Carretera

Sporting positions
Preceded by Ernesto Bessone	TC2000 champion 1997	Succeeded by Omar Martínez
