= Centenario, Neuquén =

Centenario
- Town
- Centenario Centenario (Argentina)
- Coordinates: 38°48′S 68°08′W
- Country: Argentina
- Province: Neuquén
- Founded: October 11, 1922

Government
  - Mayor: Javier Bertoldi

Area
  - Total: 274 km^{2} (106 sq mi)
- Elevation: 290 m (950 ft)

Population (2010 census)
  - Total: 32,928
  - Density: 120/km^{2} (311/sq mi)
- Time zone: UTC−3 (ART)
- ZIP: Q8309
- Area code: 0299
- Climate: BWk
- Website: Official website

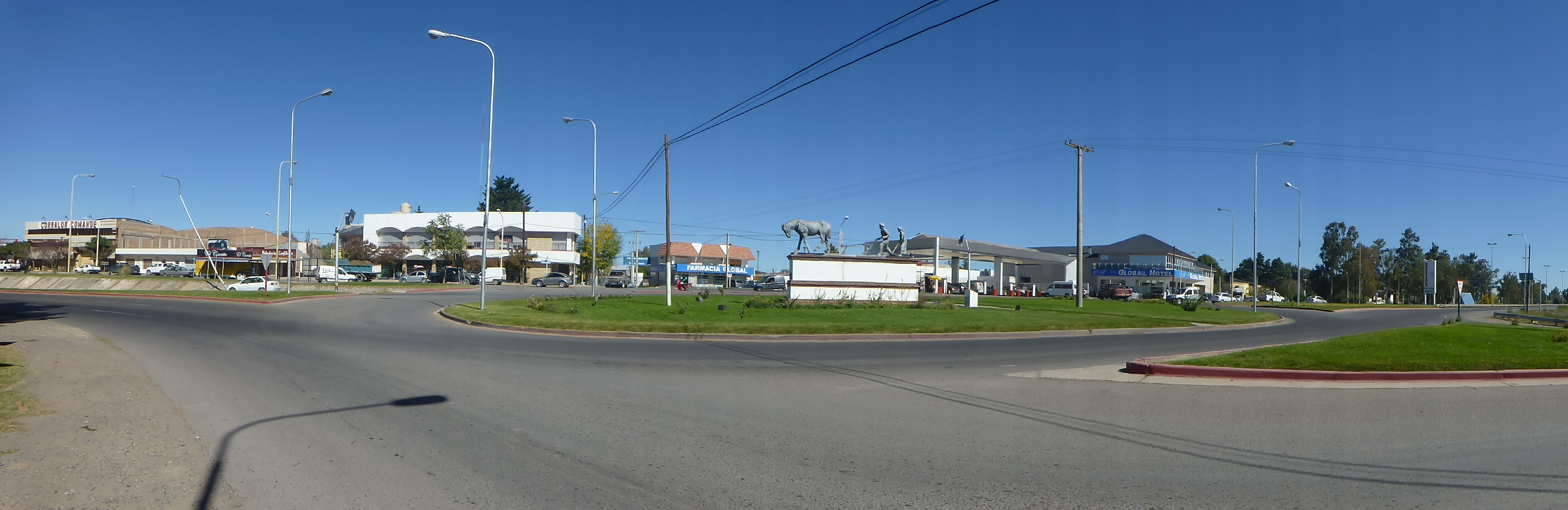

Centenario is a town and municipality in Neuquén Province in southwestern Argentina.
