= Omar Martínez =

Argentine racing driver (born 1966)

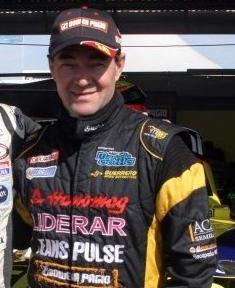
- Martínez in 2010
- Nationality: Argentine
- Born: Omar José Martínez; 1 January 1966 (age 60) Rosario del Tala, Entre Ríos Province

Turismo Carretera
- Years active: 1994–2019
- Starts: 356
- Wins: 33 (Finals)
- Best finish: 1st in 2004, 2015

Championship titles
- 2004, 2015: Turismo Carretera

Omar José "Gurí" Martínez (born January 1, 1966, in Rosario del Tala, Entre Ríos Province) is an Argentine racing driver. He competed in Turismo Carretera, TC2000, Top Race V6 and others. His nickname Gurí is a common Guaraní term used in his hometown to refer to a young boy.

== Career ==
Martínez started his career in domestical Formula Entrerriana in 1983, being vice-champion in 1985 and then passed to Argentine Formula Renault. He clinched back-to-back both 1990 and 1991 Championships before joining the competitive Formula Three Sudamericana, where he was runner-up in 1994.

Back to Argentine series, Martínez started racing in Turismo Carretera and TC2000 in 1995, representing Ford in both championships.

In 1997, Martínez crowned himself as Top Race champion by winning to Juan María Traverso in the final race. Traverso and himself were team-mates in 1998 TC 2000 season driving Hondas, and Martínez got his first title in that series.

Nevertheless, Gurí could not become Turismo Carretera champion until 2004, being four times vice-champion from 1999 to 2002. He has held since racing duels with drivers as Guillermo Ortelli and Traverso. He won the Konex Award Merit Diploma in 2010 as one of the five best Racing Drivers of the last decade in Argentina. He became TC champion again in 2015. Since 2018, he has been semi-retired.

== Career ==
- 1983–1986: Formula Entrerriana
- 1987–1992: Argentine Formula Renault (1990 and 1991 Champion)
- 1992–1994: Formula Three Sudamericana
- 1995: TC (Ford Falcon), TC2000 (Ford Escort XR3)
- 1996: TC (Ford Falcon), TC2000 (Renault 19)
- 1997: TC (Ford Falcon), Top Race Champion (Honda Prelude), TC2000 (Honda Civic VI)
- 1998: TC (Ford Falcon), Top Race (Honda Prelude), TC2000 Champion (Honda Civic VI)
- 1999: TC (Ford Falcon), Top Race (Honda Prelude), TC2000 (Honda Civic VI)
- 2000: TC (Ford Falcon), Top Race Champion (Honda Prelude and BMW 320), TC2000 (Honda Civic VI)
- 2001: TC (Ford Falcon), Top Race (Honda Civic VI), TC2000 (Honda Civic VI)
- 2002: TC (Ford Falcon), TC2000 (Honda Civic VI and Toyota Corolla)
- 2003: TC (Ford Falcon), Top Race (Peugeot 406), TC2000 (Toyota Corolla)
- 2004: TC Champion (Ford Falcon), Top Race (Ford Focus I)
- 2005: TC (Ford Falcon), TRV6 (Ford Mondeo MK III)
- 2006: TC (Ford Falcon), TRV6 Champion (Ford Mondeo MK III)
- 2007: TC (Ford Falcon), TRV6 (Ford Mondeo MK III)
- 2008: TC (Ford Falcon), TRV6 (Ford Mondeo MK III)
- 2009: TC (Ford Falcon), TRV6 (Ford Mondeo MK III), TC2000 (Fiat Linea)
- 2010: TC (Ford Falcon), TRV6 (Ford Mondeo MK III)
- 2011: TC (Ford Falcon), TRV6 (Ford Mondeo MK IV)
- 2012: TC (Ford Falcon), TRV6 (Ford Mondeo MK IV and Mercedes-Benz C-Class W204)
- 2013: TC (Ford Falcon)
- 2014: TC (Ford Falcon)
- 2015: TC Champion (Ford Falcon)
- 2016: TC (Ford Falcon), Turismo Nacional Clase 3 (Ford Focus II and Ford Focus III)
- 2017: TC (Ford Falcon)
- 2018: TC Pick Up (Ford Ranger)
- 2019: TC Pick Up (Ford Ranger)
- 2020: TC Pick Up (Ford Ranger)
- 2021: TC Pick Up (Ford Ranger)
- 2022: TC Pick Up Champion (Ford Ranger)

Sporting positions
Preceded by Sergio Solmi	Argentine Formula Renault Champion; 1990–1991	Succeeded by Norberto Della Santina
Preceded by None	Top Race V6 champion 1997	Succeeded by Juan María Traverso
Preceded by Henry Martin	TC2000 champion 1998	Succeeded by Juan Manuel Silva
Preceded by Juan María Traverso	Top Race V6 champion 2000	Succeeded by Guillermo Ortelli
Preceded by Ernesto Bessone	Turismo Carretera champion 2004	Succeeded by Juan Manuel Silva
Preceded by Guillermo Ortelli	Top Race V6 champion 2006	Succeeded by Emiliano Spataro
Preceded by Matías Rossi	Turismo Carretera; 2015	Succeeded by Guillermo Ortelli
