= TC Pick Up =

Argentine racing championship

- Category: Stock cars, pickup truck racing
- Country: Argentina
- Inaugural season: 2018
- Drivers' champion: Mariano Werner (Toyota Gazoo Racing Argentina)
- Official website: ACTC.org.ar

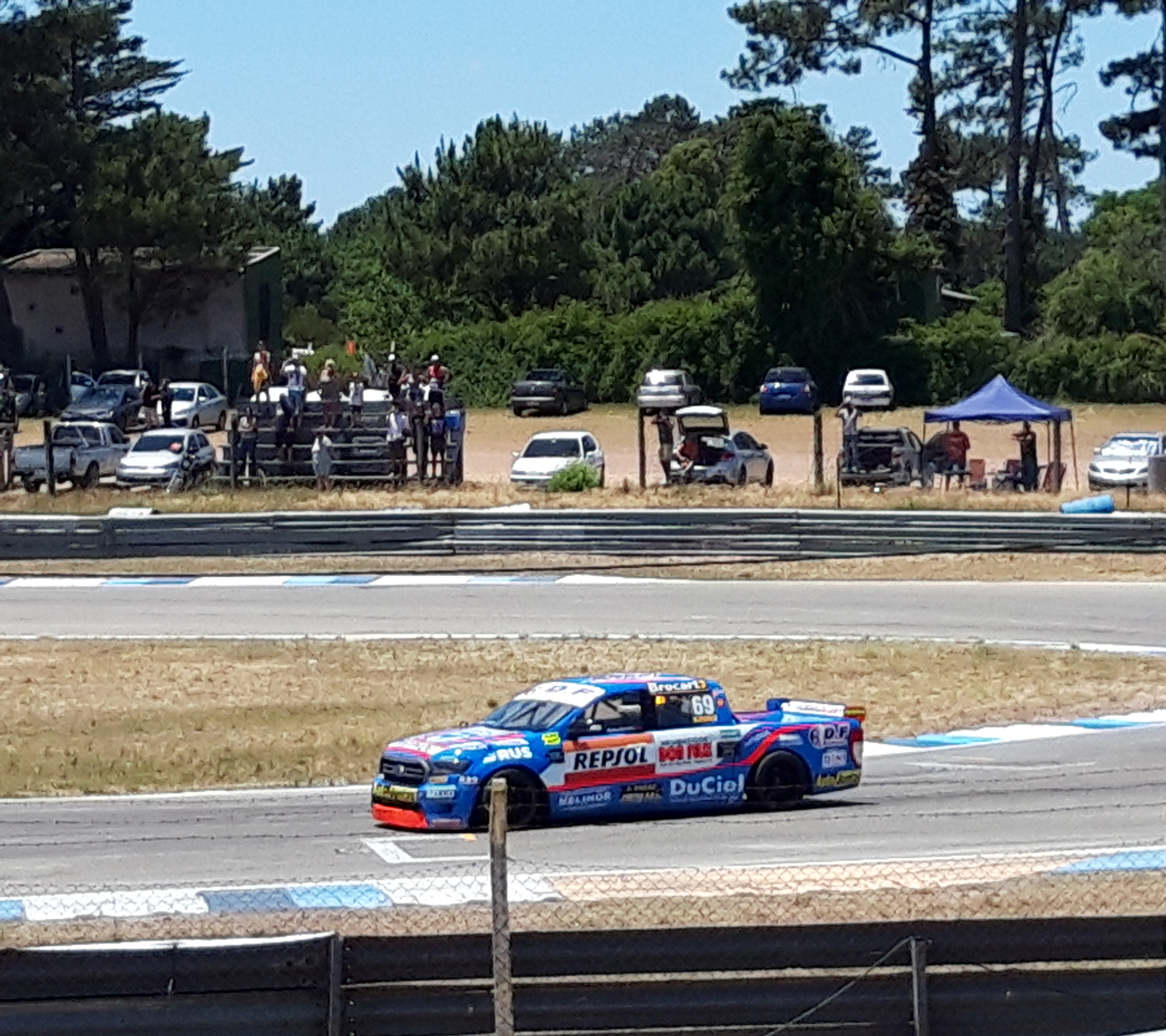
Ford Ranger of Eddy Mión

TC Pick Up (ACTC code: TCPK) is a pickup truck racing series in Argentina. It was created at the initiative of the president of the Asociación Corredores de Turismo Carretera, Hugo Mazzacane, who in October 2017 expressed the intention of creating a new category of motorsport, but specialized in pickup trucks. At the same time, the objective was to offer the usual racing drivers a new space in which to develop their racing careers, sharing a calendar with the lower divisions of the ACTC (TC Mouras and TC Pista Mouras), while offering the public a category composed of the representative models of the Argentine automotive market.

== History ==
The official presentation of this category was on 10 December 2017, with an exhibition held by one of the prototypes at the Autódromo Roberto José Mouras in La Plata, while the inaugural competition took place on 23 September 2018 in the aforementioned circuit, prior announcement by the ACTC Board of Directors. Guillermo Ortelli had the honor of being the first winner in history competing in command of a Nissan Frontier, while Gastón Mazzacane was its first champion in command of a Volkswagen Amarok.

The first race of the TC Pick Up had the participation, in addition to Ford, of the brands Nissan, Toyota and Volkswagen. Finally and in a personal commitment, the driver Christian Dose announced for the 2019 season his entry into the category at the command of a Chevrolet S-10, which however had to dispense with its original name due to the legal conflict proposed by General Motors, for the use of the brand and model name. For this reason, Dose ended up presenting his truck, calling it simply "La Chiva 50", in honor of the nickname by which the Chevrolet brand is known in Argentina and the number used by the driver. Finally, this litigation had its end in October 2019, when General Motors' authorization to use both the brand and the model name S-10 became official.

Finally, another brand that joined the category in 2019 was the Italian automaker Fiat, which did so by taking the SUP Fiat Toro as a representative model and officially representing itself under the Donto Racing name.

== Vehicles ==
=== Manufacturer representation ===
The models approved for this category are mid-size pickup trucks equipped with tubular structures developed by the ACTC, in collaboration with Talleres Jakos. Mechanically, they are equipped with the same drive unit that equips the Turismo Carretera units, Consisting of a 6-cylinder engine, 24 valves and double overhead camshaft, developed by the firm TopLine.

Each prototype represents the following production models:

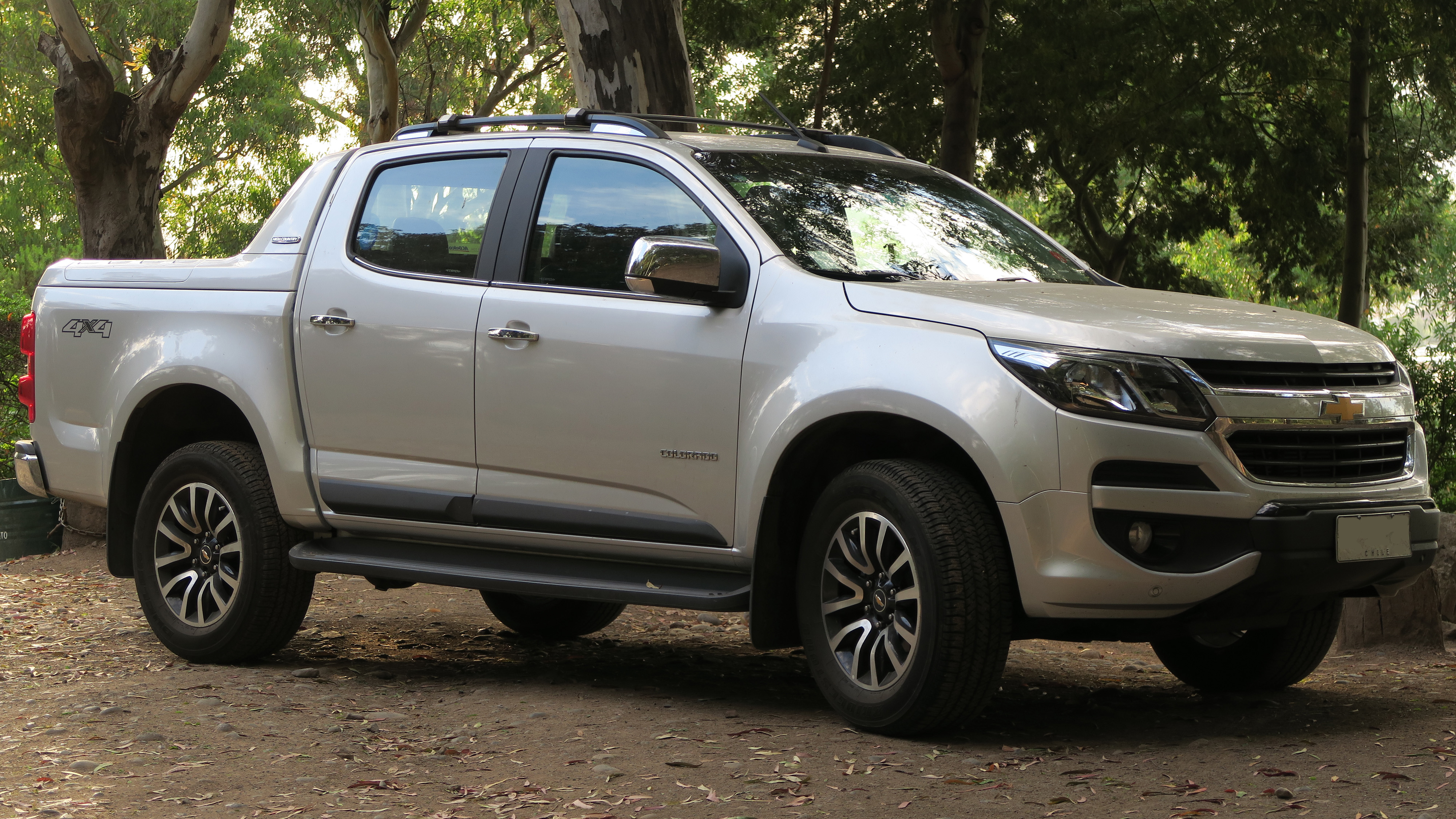
Chevrolet S-10 SSR (name of Racing Version)

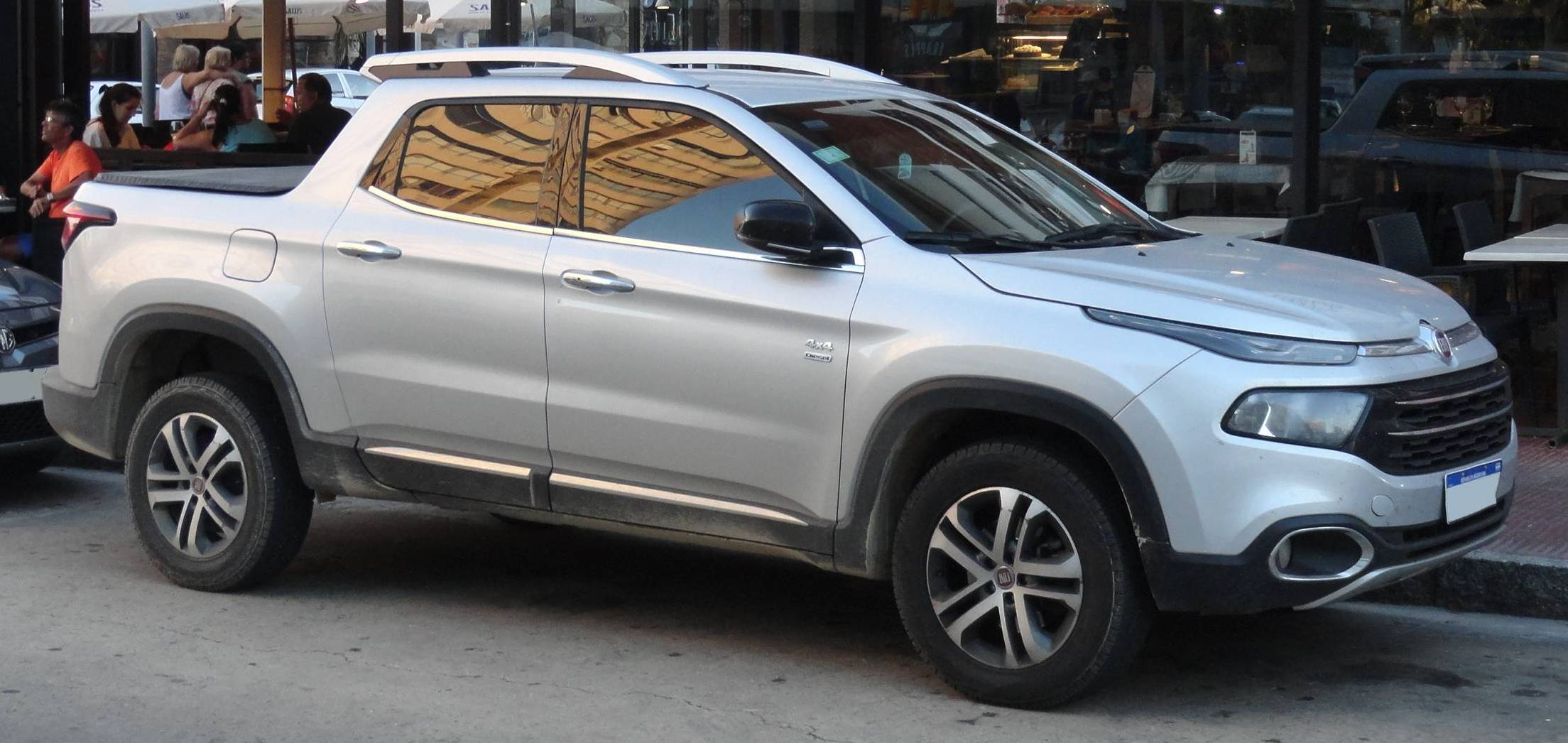
Abarth Toro SF75 (name of Racing Version)

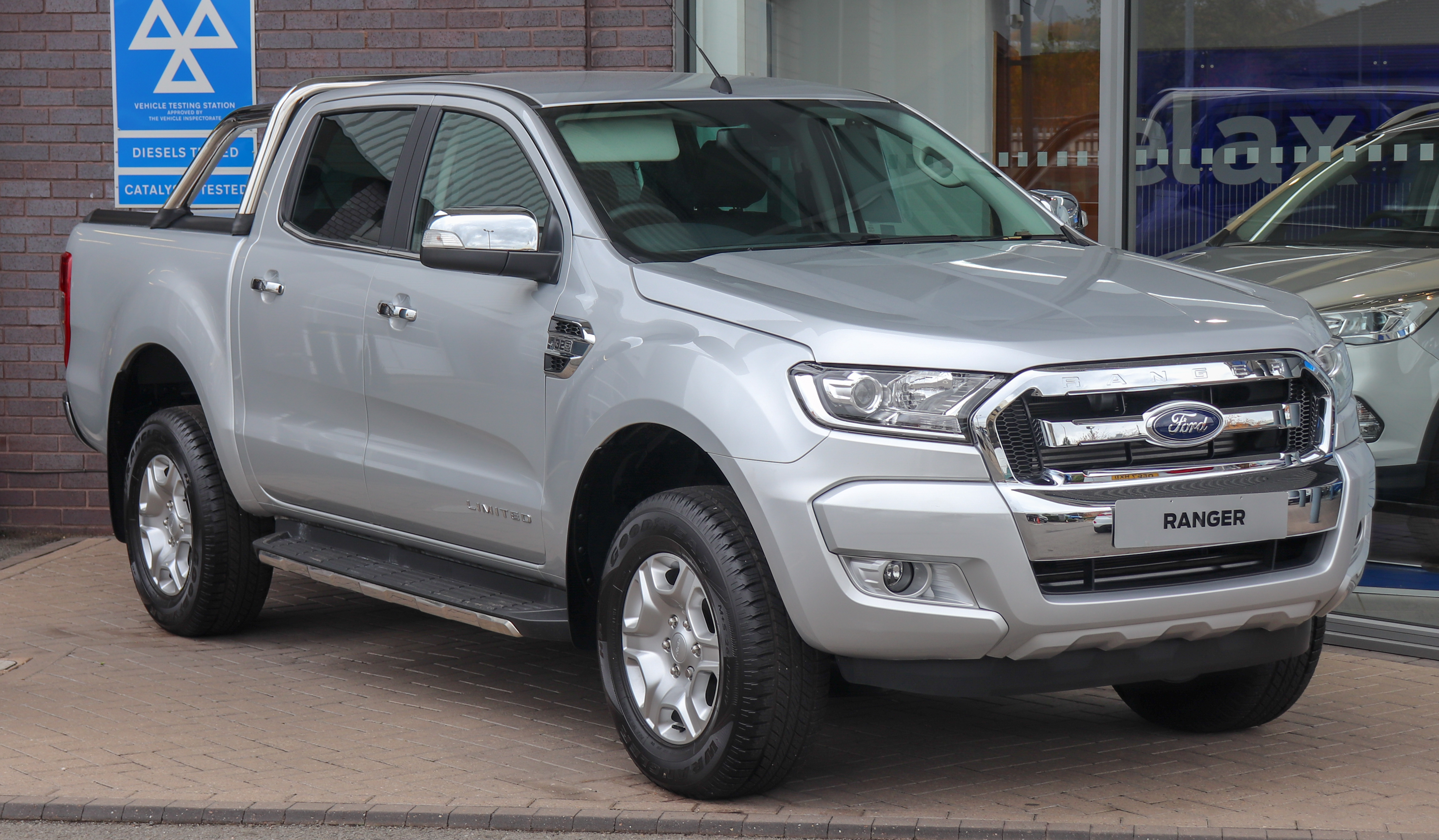
Ford Ranger R23GT (name of Racing Version)

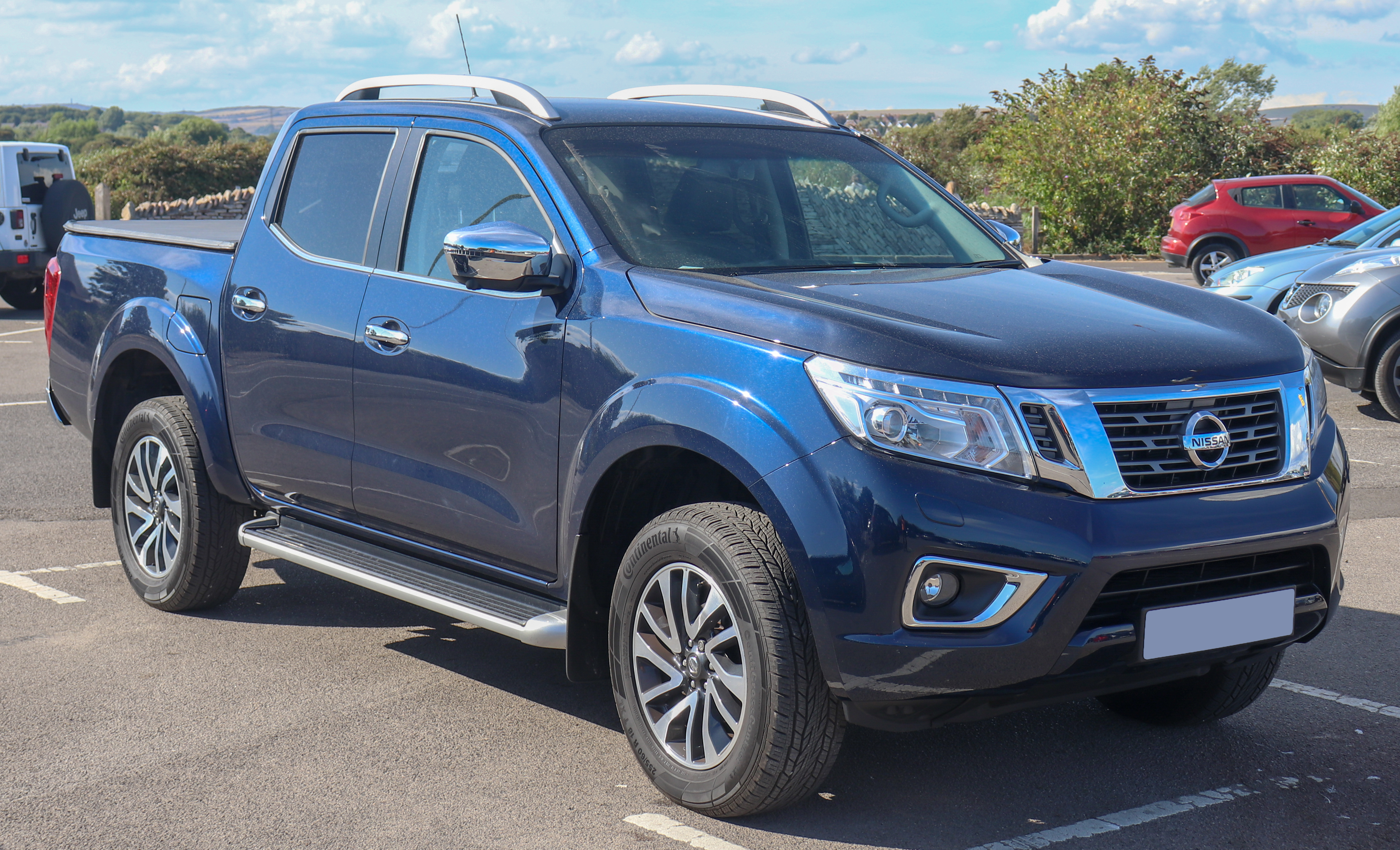
Nissan Frontier GT7 (name of Racing Version)

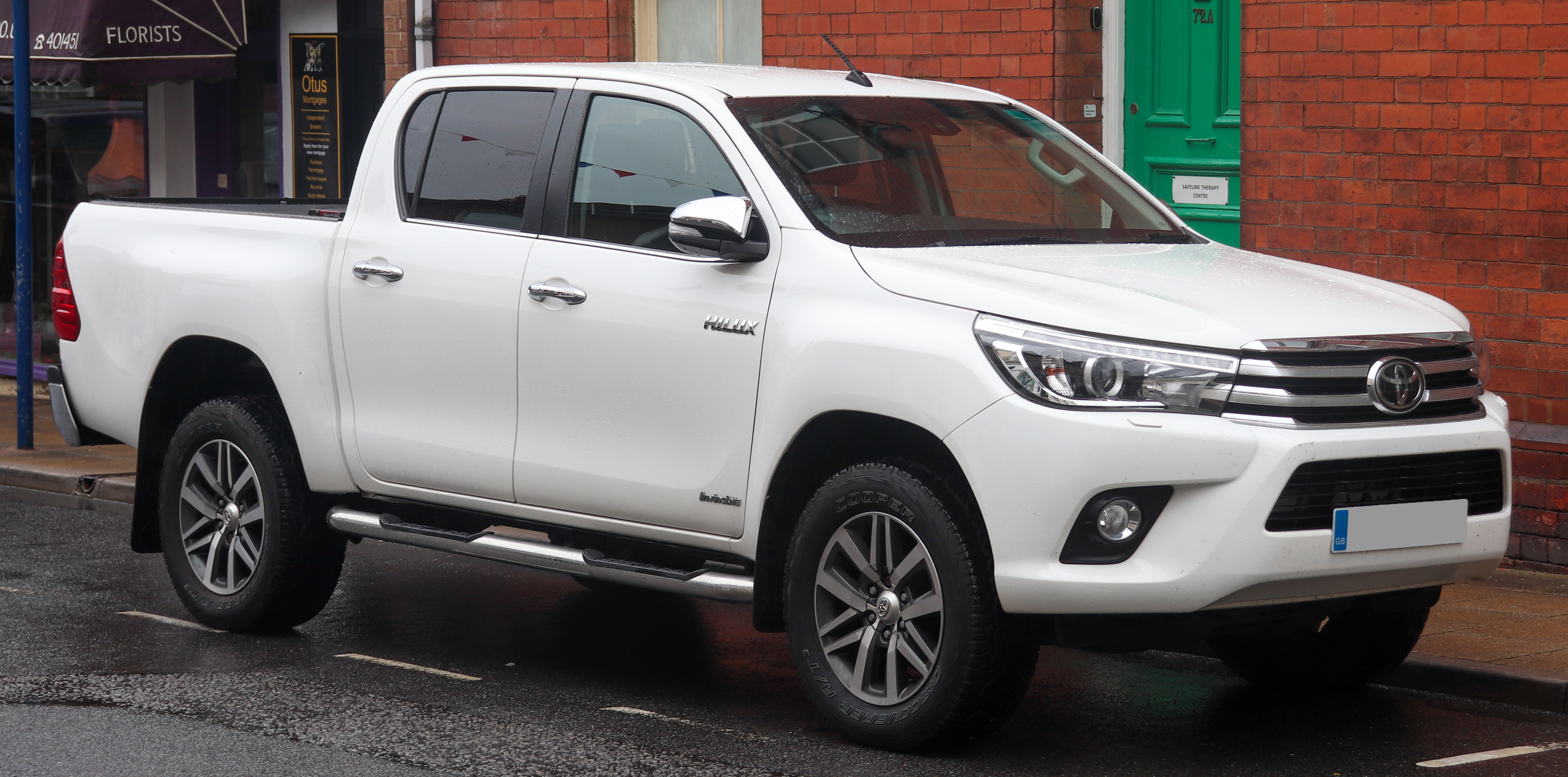
Toyota GR Hilux GT77 (name of Racing Version)

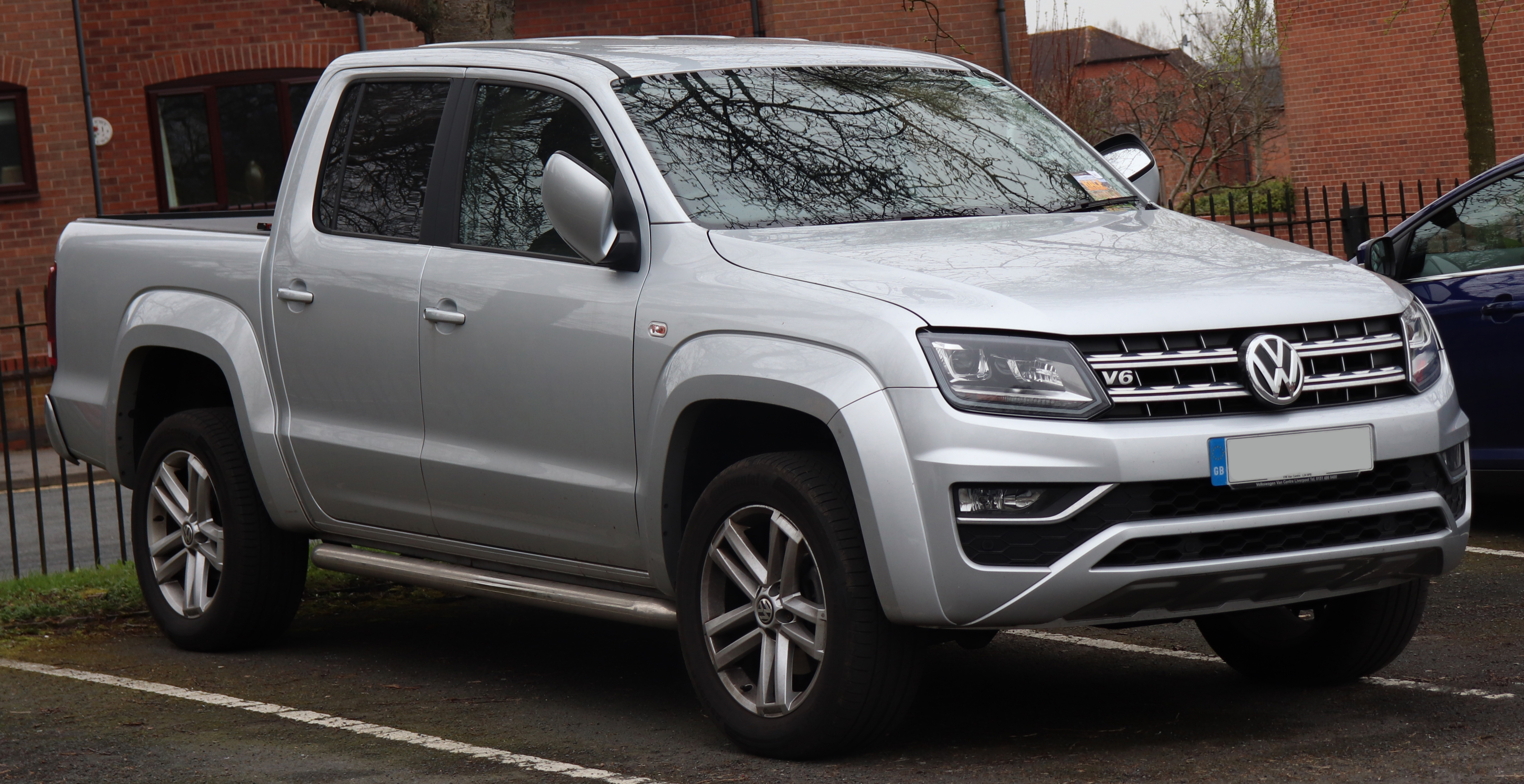
Volkswagen Amarok GT10RS (name of Racing Version)

=== Technical regulations ===
- Chassis construction: Tubular silhouettes
- Engine displacement: Inline-six, 3,260 cc (199 cu in) to 3,310 cc (202 cu in), depending on the brand
- Aspiration: Natural
- Fuel delivery: 2 dual-body Weber 48-48 IDA carburetors
- Fuel capacity: 88 litres (22 US gal)
- Fuel: Shell V-Power
- Tires: Neumáticos de Avanzada 18 inches
- Minimum weight: 1,370 kg (3,020 lb)
- Power output: Approximately 450 hp (336 kW) at 8,500–8,900 RPM, depending on the brand
- Front and rear track width: 2,000 mm (79 in) maximum
- Wheelbase: 3,215 mm (126.6 in) to 3,225 mm (126.9 in)
- Gearbox: Sáenz TT3 6-speed manual sequential + 1 reverse
- Steering: Rack and pinion
- Drivetrain: FR layout

== Champions ==
Year	Driver	Vehicle
2018	(Argentina) Gastón Mazzacane	Volkswagen Amarok GTSSR
2019	(Argentina) Juan Pablo Gianini	Ford Ranger GT7R
2020	(Argentina) Juan Pablo Gianini	Ford Ranger GT7R
2021	(Argentina) Juan Pablo Gianini	Ford Ranger R23GT
2022	(Argentina) Omar Martínez	Ford Ranger R23GT
2023	(Argentina) Mariano Werner	Toyota GR Hilux GT77T
2024	(Argentina) Juan Pablo Gianini	Ford Ranger R23GT
2025	(Argentina) Agustín Canapino	Chevrolet S-10
2026		
