= Turismo Nacional =

Auto racing championship in Argentina

- Category: Touring car racing
- Country: Argentina
- Inaugural season: 1961
- Drivers' champion: Abarth Cup: Figgo Bessone; Class 2: Matías Cravero; Class 3: Jonatan Castellano
- Makes' champion: See below
- Official website: Official website

Turismo Nacional (National tourism, lit., national touring) popularly known by its acronym TN, is a touring car racing series based in Argentina that has been active since 1961. It is organized by the Asociación de Pilotos de Automóviles de Turismo and is governed by the Automobile Sports Commission of the Argentine Automobile Club. The cars involved are almost standard preparation cars, that is to say practically a road car prepared for competitions. Originally, only models made in Argentina were allowed (hence the name, that is, nationally manufactured), but after Argentina's entry into Mercosur, Brazilian models were allowed.

Currently, Turismo Nacional is made up of two divisions, which share the calendar but the races run separately. In Class 2, B-segment models with engines up to 1.6-liter displacement are allowed. Class 3 cars are limited to 2.0 liters of displacement; mainly, C-segment models are allowed.

== Classes ==
From its inception, the category organized its competitions, dividing its fleet into classes, for which the size of the vehicle and the displacement of the engines had to be taken into account. Initially, 5 TN classes were organized.

Currently, the category is divided into two distinct divisions. The smaller division is known as Class 2, which is intended for those cars of national production, standard preparation and with a maximum displacement of 1600 cm3. While the largest division is known as Class 3, which admits the same conditions as Class 2, but differing in its displacement, which is allowed up to a ceiling of 2000 cm3.

With the elimination of import restrictions due to the creation of Mercosur, models produced in Brazil were admitted to the category.

=== Class 2 ===
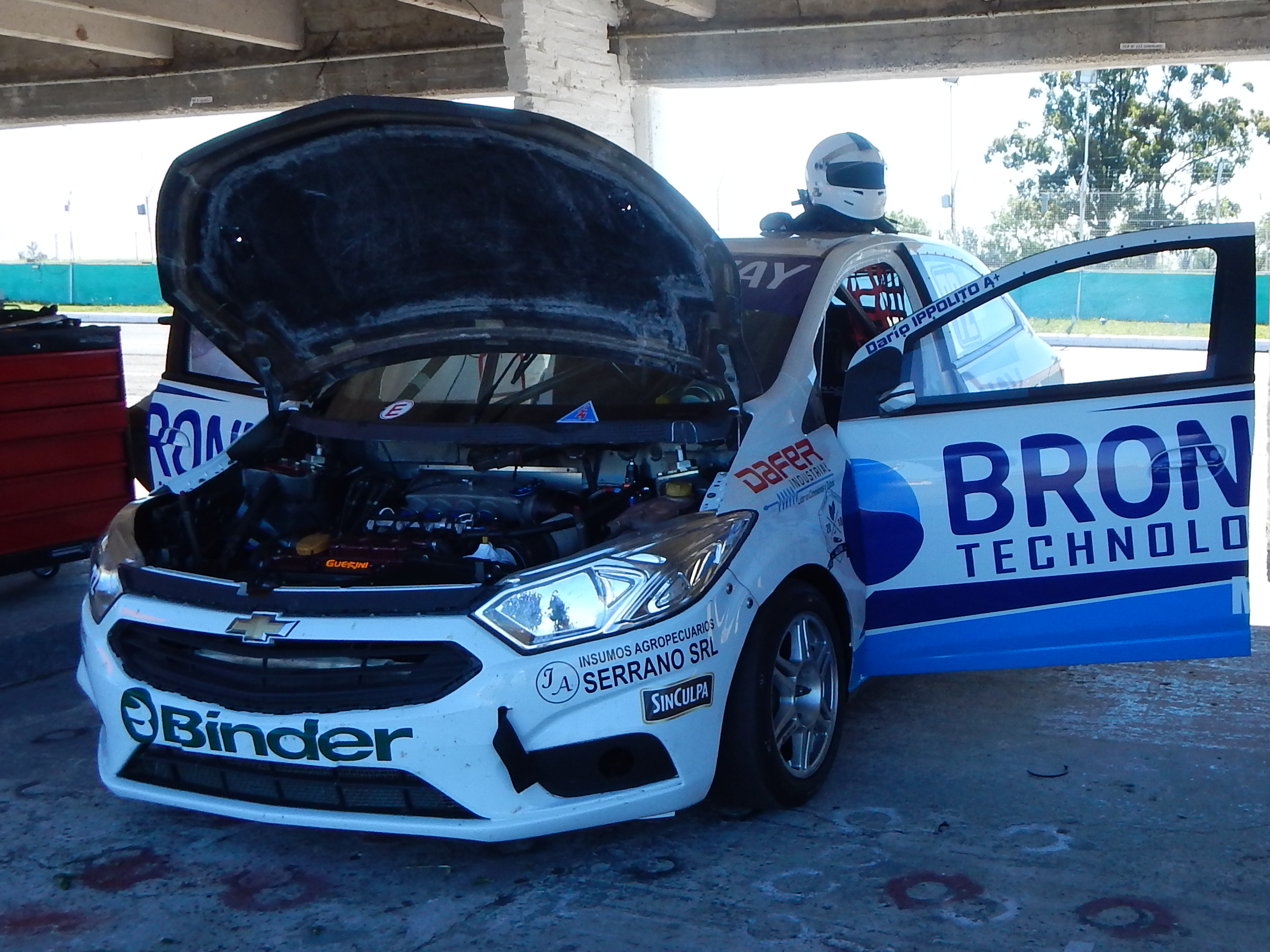
A Chevrolet Onix of Class 2.

==== Models ====
- Chevrolet Onix
- Chevrolet Classic
- Fiat Palio
- Fiat Argo
- Ford Fiesta Kinetic
- Renault Clio
- Renault Kwid
- Toyota Etios
- Nissan March
- Peugeot 208
- Volkswagen Gol Trend
- Citroën DS3

=== Class 3 ===
==== Models ====
- Chevrolet Cruze
- Citroën C4 Lounge
- Fiat Tipo
- Ford Focus
- Honda Civic
- Kia Cerato
- Peugeot 408
- Toyota Corolla
- Volkswagen Vento II

== Champions ==
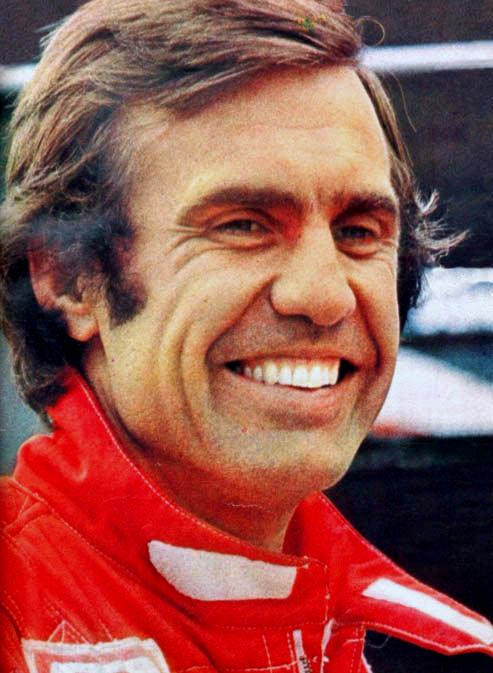
Carlos Reutemann, champion of Clase D in 1966 and 1967.

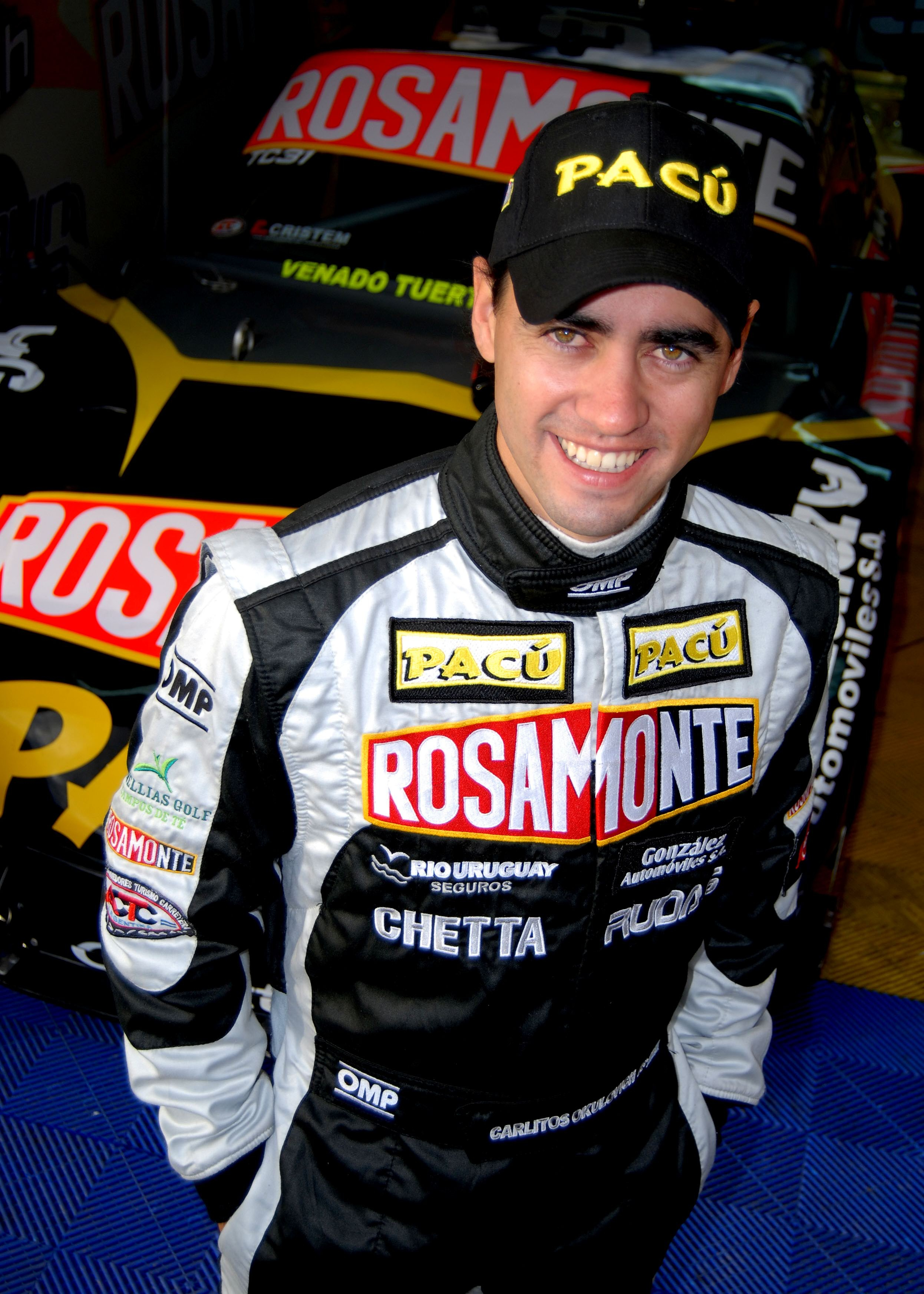
Carlos Okulovich, champion of Clase 3 in 2010.

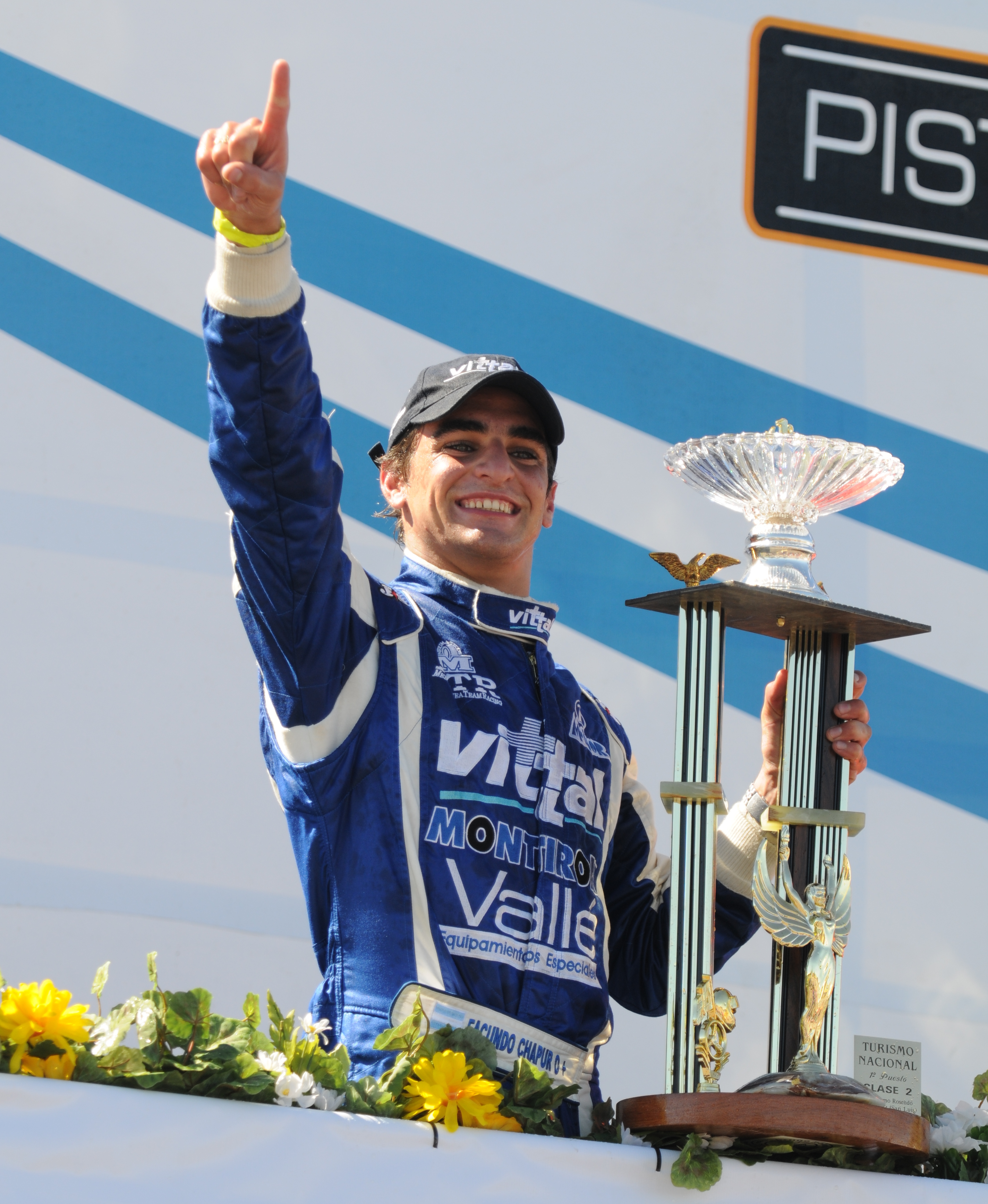
Facundo Chapur, champion of Clase 3 in 2013 and 2015.

Year	Class	Champions	Car
1961	Clase A	Heriberto Bohnen	NSU Prinz
1961	Clase B	Vicente Formisano	Auto Union 1000
1962	Clase A	Remigio Caldara	Isard 700
1962	Clase B	Gonzalo Gainza Paz	Auto Union 1000
1962	Clase C	José Migliore	Peugeot 403
1963	Clase A	Domingo López Oribe	NSU Prinz
1963	Clase B	Gastón Perkins	Renault Gordini
1963	Clase C	Ernesto Santamarina	Peugeot 404
1964	Clase A	José Calduch	De Carlo 700
1964	Clase B	Gastón Perkins	Renault Gordini
1964	Clase C	Eduardo Rodríguez Canedo	Fiat 1500
1965	Clase A	Rogelio Scaramella	De Carlo 700
1965	Clase B	Gastón Perkins	Renault Gordini
1965	Clase C	Rosmualdo Visintini	Auto Union 1000
1965	Clase D	Nasif Estéfano	Fiat 1500
1966	Clase A	Rogelio Scaramella	De Carlo 700
1966	Clase B	Carlos Ruesch	Renault Gordini
1966	Clase C	Rosmualdo Visintini	Auto Union 1000
1966	Clase D	Carlos Reutemann	Fiat 1500
1967	Clase A	Rogelio Scaramella	De Carlo 700
1967	Clase B	Danilo Bonamicci	Renault Gordini
1967	Clase C	Rosmualdo Visintini	Auto Union 1000
1967	Clase D	Carlos Reutemann	Fiat 1500
1967	Clase E	Eduardo Rodríguez Canedo	Torino 380 W
1968	Clase B	Ángel Monguzzi	Renault Gordini
1968	Clase C	Rosmualdo Visintini	Auto Union 1000
1968	Clase D	Norberto Castañón	Peugeot 404
1969	Clase B	Emilio Parisi	Renault Gordini
1969	Clase C	Norberto Castañón	Peugeot 404
1969	Clase D	Alberto Rodríguez Larreta	Torino 380 W
1970	Clase C	Rosmualdo Visintini	Auto Union 1000
1970	Clase D	José Migliore	Peugeot 504
1971	Clase B	Eduardo Giordano	Renault Gordini
1971	Clase C	Danilo Bonamici	Fiat 1600
1971	Clase D	José Migliore	Peugeot 504
1972	Clase B	Aldo Caldarella	Fiat 128
1972	Clase C	Francisco Mayorga	Peugeot 504
1973	Clase B	José Carlomagno	Fiat 128
1973	Clase C	Francisco Mayorga	Peugeot 504
1974	Clase B	Luis Macri	Fiat 128
1974	Clase C	Jorge Recalde	Fiat 125
1975	Clase B	Juan Pablo Zampa	Fiat 128
1975	Clase C	Ricardo Zunino	Fiat 125
1976	Clase B	Jorge Spinetto	Fiat 128
1976	Clase C	Ricardo Zunino	Fiat 125
1977	Clase B	Jorge Spinetto	Fiat 128
1977	Clase C	Rubén Daray	Fiat 125
1978 (CADAD)	Clase B	Osvaldo Morresi	Fiat 128
1978 (CADAD)	Clase C	Francisco Alcuaz	Peugeot 504
1978 (ACA)	Clase B	Gabriel Raies	Fiat 128
1978 (ACA)	Clase C	Carlos Garro	Peugeot 504
1979	Clase B	Julio Pardo	Fiat 128
1979	Clase C	Carlos Garro	Peugeot 504
1980	Clase B	Jorge Serafini	Fiat 128
1980	Clase C	Juan Carlos Rizzuto	Fiat 125
1981	Clase A	Marcelo Raies	Fiat 147
1981	Clase B	Jorge Bescham	Fiat 128
1981	Clase C	Gabriel Raies	Fiat 125
1981	Clase D	Francisco Alcuaz	Peugeot 504
1982	Clase 5	Julio Pardo-Gustavo Der Ohanessian	Fiat 128
1982	Clase 6	Jorge Bescham	Fiat 128
1982	Clase 7	Daniel Mustafá-Ángel Monguzzi	Renault 18
1982	Clase 8	Francisco Mayorga	Datsun 280ZX
1982	Clase 9	Jorge Cecchetto-Elvio Borgioli	Daihatsu Charade
1982	Clase 10	Alberto Baldinelli	Fiat 128
1982	Clase 11	Néstor Percaz	Fiat 128
1982	Clase 12	José Fortunato	Peugeot 504
1983	Clase 1	Carlos Rosati	Fiat 128
1983	Clase 2	Carlos Zabala	Fiat 128
1983	Clase 3	Arnoldo Capra	Peugeot 504
1984	Clase 2	Hugo Olmi	Fiat 128
1984	Clase 3	José Cano	Renault 18
1985	Clase 2	Ernesto Bessone Sr.	Alfa Romeo Sprint
1985	Clase 3	Eduardo García Gómez	Renault 18
1986	Clase 2	Omar Darío Bonomo	Volkswagen Gacel
1986	Clase 3	Jorge Maggi	Alfa Romeo GTV
1986	Monomarca Sierra	Oscar Fineschi	Ford Sierra
1987	Clase 2	Omar Darío Bonomo	Volkswagen Gacel
1987	Clase 3	Jorge Maggi	Alfa Romeo GTV
1987	Monomarca Sierra	Jorge Guiral	Ford Sierra
1988	Clase 2	Ernesto Rodríguez	Volkswagen Gacel
1988	Clase 3	Fernando Adba	Renault 18
1988	Monomarca Sierra	Oscar Fineschi	Ford Sierra
1989	Clase 2	Rafael Verna	Volkswagen Gacel
1989	Clase 3	Ricardo Albertengo	Renault 18
1989	Monomarca Sierra	Jorge Eidilstein	Ford Sierra
1990	Clase 2	René Zanatta	Volkswagen Gacel
1990	Clase 3	Pablo Peón	Renault 18
1990	Monomarca Sierra	Gerardo del Campo	Ford Sierra
1991	Clase 2	René Zanatta	Volkswagen Gacel
1991	Clase 3	Pablo Peón	Renault 18
1991	Monomarca Sierra	Gerardo del Campo	Ford Sierra
1992	Clase 2	Rafael Verna	Ford Escort
1992	Clase 3	Omar Bonomo	Volkswagen Carat
1992	Monomarca Sierra	Pablo Rafú	Ford Sierra
1993	Clase 2	Rafael Verna	Ford Escort
1993	Clase 3	Gerardo del Campo	Ford Escort
1993	Clase 4	Norberto della Santina	Ford Sierra
1994	Clase 2	Rafael Verna	Ford Escort
1994	Clase 3	Gerardo del Campo	Ford Escort
1994	Clase 4	Carlos Rossetti	Ford Sierra
1995	Clase 2	Carlos Míguez	Ford Escort
1995	Clase 3	Rafael Verna	Ford Escort
1995	Clase 4	Diego Ponte	Ford Sierra
1996	Clase 2	Paolo D'Amico	Ford Escort
1996	Clase 3	Omar Suriani	Renault 18
1997	Clase 2	Julio Catalán Magni	Ford Escort
1997	Clase 3	Norberto della Santina	Volkswagen Gol
1998	Clase 2	Paolo D'Amico	Chevrolet
1998	Clase 3	Omar Bonomo	Ford Escort
1999	Clase 2	Adrián Hang	Volkswagen Gol
1999	Clase 3	Oscar Canela	Volkswagen Polo
2000	Clase 2	Nicolás Vuyovich	Volkswagen Gol
2000	Clase 3	Walter Tanoni	Ford Escort
2001	Clase 2	Paolo D'Amico	Renault
2001	Clase 3	Lucas Armellini	Honda Civic
2002	Clase 2	Néstor Percaz	Ford Escort
2002	Clase 3	Nicolás Vuyovich	Honda Civic
2003	Clase 2	Néstor Percaz	Ford Escort
2003	Clase 3	Ernesto Bessone	Ford Escort
2004	Clase 2	Juan Pedro Heguy	Ford Escort
2004	Clase 3	Pablo Redolfi	Honda Civic
2005	Clase 2	Juan Pedro Heguy	Ford Escort
2005	Clase 3	Patricio Di Palma	Ford Escort
2006	Clase 2	Iván Saturni	Renault Clio
2006	Clase 3	Hugo Lepphaille	Honda Civic
2007	Clase 2	Joaquin Volpi	Ford Fiesta
2007	Clase 3	Ezequiel Bosio	Renault Clio
2008	Clase 2	Leandro Vallasciani	Renault Clio
2008	Clase 3	Esteban Tuero	Ford Focus
2009	Clase 2	Ivan Ciccarelli	Renault Clio
2009	Clase 3	Marcelo Bugliotti	Chevrolet Astra
2010	Clase 2	Adrián Percaz	Peugeot 206
2010	Clase 3	Carlos Okulovich	Honda New Civic
2011	Clase 2	Bruno Bosio	Chevrolet Corsa
2011	Clase 3	Fabián Yannantuoni	Peugeot 307
2012	Clase 2	Facundo Chapur	Ford Fiesta
2012	Clase 3	Emanuel Moriatis	Ford Focus
2013	Clase 2	Matias Machuca	Renault Clio
2013	Clase 3	Facundo Chapur	Peugeot 308
2014	Clase 2	Hanna Abdallah	Renault Clio
2014	Clase 3	Matías Rossi	Citroën C4
2015	Clase 2	Adrián Percaz	Peugeot 207 Compact
2015	Clase 3	Facundo Chapur	Peugeot 308
2016	Clase 2	Alfonso Domenech	Renault Clio
2016	Clase 3	Emanuel Moriatis	Ford Focus
2017	Clase 2	Alejandro Bucci	Ford Fiesta KD
2017	Clase 3	Mariano Werner	Fiat Linea
2018	Clase 2	Nicolás Posco	Ford Fiesta Kinetic
2018	Clase 3	Leonel Pernía	Honda Civic
2019	Clase 2	Ever Franetovich	Fiat Palio
2019	Clase 3	José Manuel Urcera	Honda Civic
2020	Clase 2	Nicolás Posco	Ford Fiesta Kinetic
2020	Clase 3	José Manuel Urcera	Honda Civic
2021	Clase 2	Emanuel Abdala	Ford Fiesta Kinetic
2021	Clase 3	Julián Santero	Toyota Corolla
2022	Copa Abarth	Figgo Bessone	Abarth 595
2022	Clase 2	Matías Cravero	Ford Fiesta Kinetic
2022	Clase 3	Jonatan Castellano	Chevrolet Cruze
