= Top Race V6 =

Touring car race series in Argentina

- Category: Touring car racing
- Country: Argentina
- Inaugural season: 1997
- Tyre suppliers: Pirelli
- Drivers' champion: Diego Javier Azar (Toyota Gazoo Racing Argentina)
- Official website: Official website

Top Race V6 is a touring car race series held in Argentina. It was founded in 1997.

== The cars ==
The Top Race V6 category sees the vehicles presented in silhouette form, with identical, strictly controlled mechanical specifications. Body styles currently running in the series are the Ford Mondeo, Chevrolet Vectra (aka Vauxhall/Opel Astra), Peugeot 407, Mercedes C-Class and Volkswagen Passat, all in sedan form. In previous seasons, Renault Laguna and Citroën C5 bodies were also used.

Engines are identical 3.0 litre V6 units tuned by Kit Berta to produce approximately 350 hp. Chassis (tubular steel), suspension (control front, independent rear), tires (Pirelli PZero slicks on 18 inch cast aluminium wheels) and gearboxes (Mark Saenz H-Pattern 5 speed) are all identical control items. The vehicles also run a uniform body kit consisting of front splitter/air dam, side skirts, and rear wing. Body modifications are allowed to present a more race oriented look (such as flared wheel arches and widened bodies), but this is also strictly controlled to keep all the vehicles even.

As a result, racing is cost effective as well as being close and highly competitive.

== Champions ==
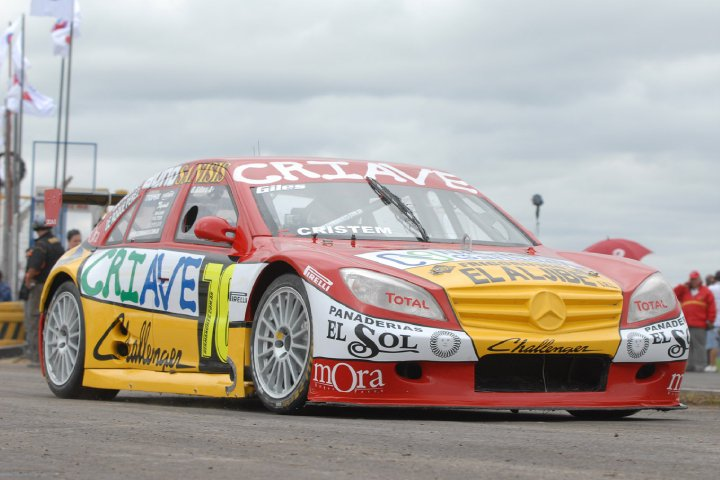
Top Race V6 Mercedes-Benz C-Class silhouette

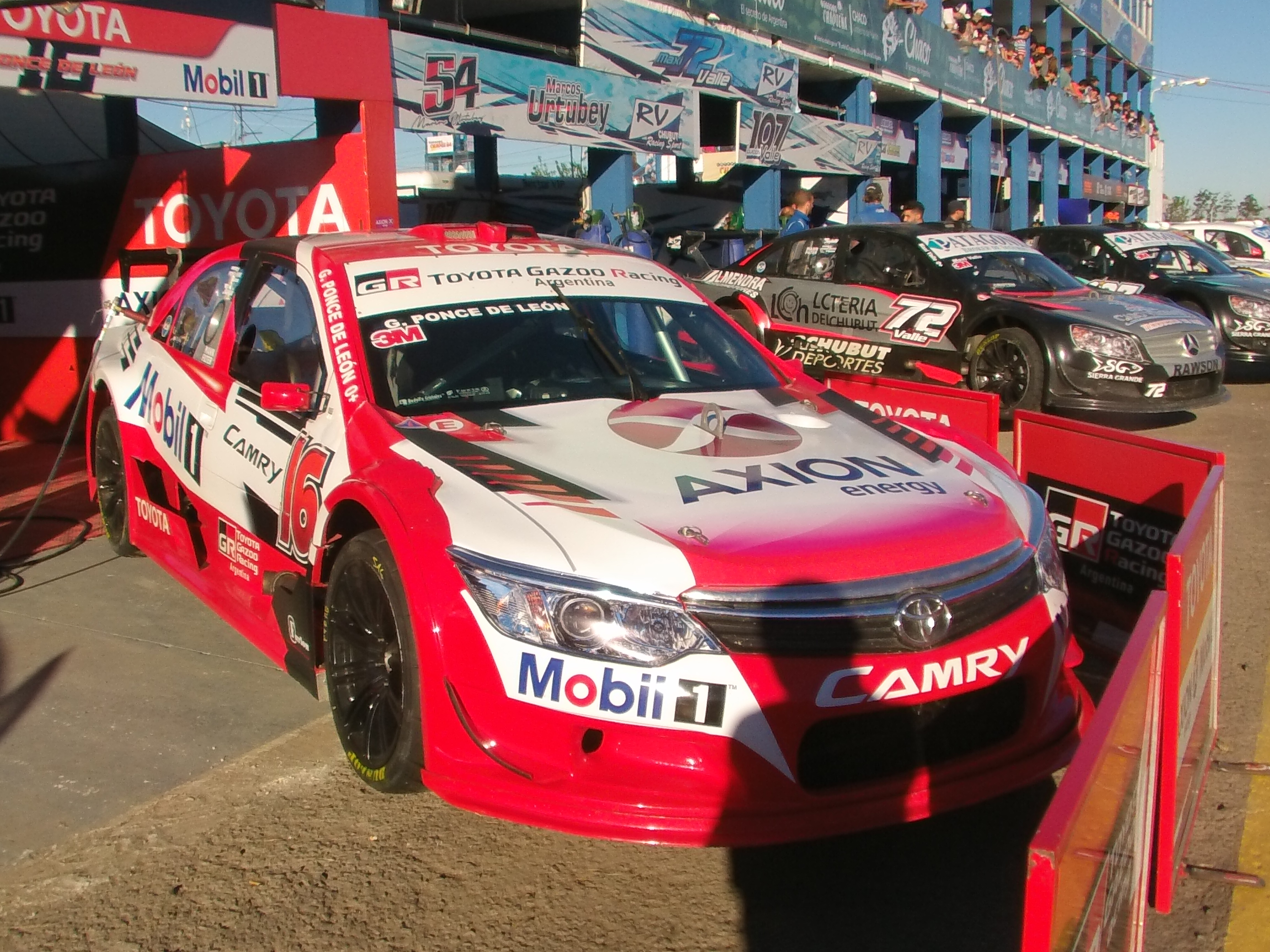
Toyota Camry XV50 of Toyota Argentina factory team (2017)

=== Former Top Race ===
Year	Driver	Car
1997	(Argentina) Omar Martínez	Honda Prelude
1998	(Argentina) Juan María Traverso	Mercedes-Benz 280
1999	(Argentina) Juan María Traverso	Peugeot 405
2000	(Argentina) Omar Martínez	Honda Prelude
2001	(Argentina) Guillermo Ortelli	BMW 320i
2002	(Argentina) Diego Aventín	BMW 320i
2003	(Argentina) Juan María Traverso	BMW 320i
2004	(Argentina) Ernesto Bessone	Ford Escort
2005	(Argentina) Claudio Kohler	BMW 320i

=== Top Race V6 ===
Year	Driver	Car
2005	(Argentina) Guillermo Ortelli	Chevrolet Vectra II
2006	(Argentina) Omar Martínez	Ford Mondeo II
2007	(Argentina) Emiliano Spataro	Volkswagen Passat V
2008	(Argentina) Emiliano Spataro	Volkswagen Passat V
2009	(Argentina) José María López	Ford Mondeo II
Copa América 2010	(Argentina) Guido Falaschi	Ford Mondeo II
Close Tournament 2010	(Argentina) Agustín Canapino	Mercedes-Benz C-Class W203
2011	(Argentina) Agustín Canapino	Mercedes-Benz C-Class W203
2012	(Argentina) Agustín Canapino	Mercedes-Benz C-Class W204
2013	(Argentina) Agustín Canapino	Mercedes-Benz C-Class W204
2014	(Argentina) Agustín Canapino	Mercedes-Benz C-Class W204
2015	(Argentina) Matías Rodríguez	Mercedes-Benz C-Class W204
2016	(Argentina) Agustín Canapino	Mercedes-Benz C-Class W204
2017	(Argentina) Agustín Canapino	Mercedes-Benz C-Class W204
2018	(Argentina) Franco Girolami	Mitsubishi Lancer GT
2019	(Argentina) Matías Rossi	Toyota Camry XV50
2020	(Argentina) Matías Rossi	Toyota Camry XV50
2021	(Argentina) Diego Javier Azar	Toyota Camry XV50
2022	(Argentina) Diego Javier Azar	Lexus

=== Support series ===
Year	Top Race Series		Top Race Junior		Top Race NOA	
Year	Driver	Car	Driver	Car	Driver	Car
2007			(Argentina) Federico Bathiche	Alfa Romeo 156		
2008			(Argentina) Gonzalo Perlo	Ford Mondeo		
2009	(Uruguay) Gerardo Salaverría	Chevrolet Vectra II	(Argentina) Germán Giles	Chevrolet Vectra		
Copa América 2010	(Argentina) Federico Lifschitz	Ford Mondeo II	(Argentina) Humberto Krujoski	Ford Mondeo		
2012	(Argentina) Humberto Krujoski	Ford Mondeo III	(Argentina) Facundo Della Motta			
2013	(Argentina) Henry Martin	Volkswagen Passat V	Cancelled		(Argentina) Eduardo Maidana	Ford Mondeo
2014	(Argentina) Lucas Ariel Guerra	Fiat Linea Series			(Argentina) Peter Olaz	Ford Mondeo
2015	(Argentina) Fabián Flaqué	Mercedes-Benz CLA Series			(Argentina) Juan Ortega	Audi S6 NOA
2016	(Argentina) Lucas Valle	Chevrolet Cruze Series	(Argentina) Giovanni Elizalde	Audi S6 Junior		
2017	(Argentina) Bruno Boccanera	Fiat Tipo Series	(Argentina) Martín Ferreyra	Chevrolet Cruze Junior		
2018	(Argentina) Gastón Crusitta	Chevrolet Cruze Series	(Argentina) Santiago Piovano	Citroën C4 Junior		
2019	(Argentina) Bruno Boccanera	Ford Mondeo Series	(Argentina) Ariel Persia	Toyota Corolla Junior		
2020	(Argentina) Franco Morillo	Fiat Cronos Series	(Argentina) Thomas Micheloud	Chevrolet Cruze Junior		
2021	(Argentina) Diego Verriello	Fiat Cronos Series	(Argentina) José Malbrán	Mercedes-Benz CLA Junior		
2022	(Argentina) Sebastian Alzamendi	Toyota Corolla	(Argentina) Franco Beatini	Mercedes-Benz CLA Junior		
2023						
2024	(Argentina) Luis José Di Palma	Fiat Cronos Series	(Argentina) Lucas Bohdanowicz	Toyota Corolla Junior		

== Point system ==
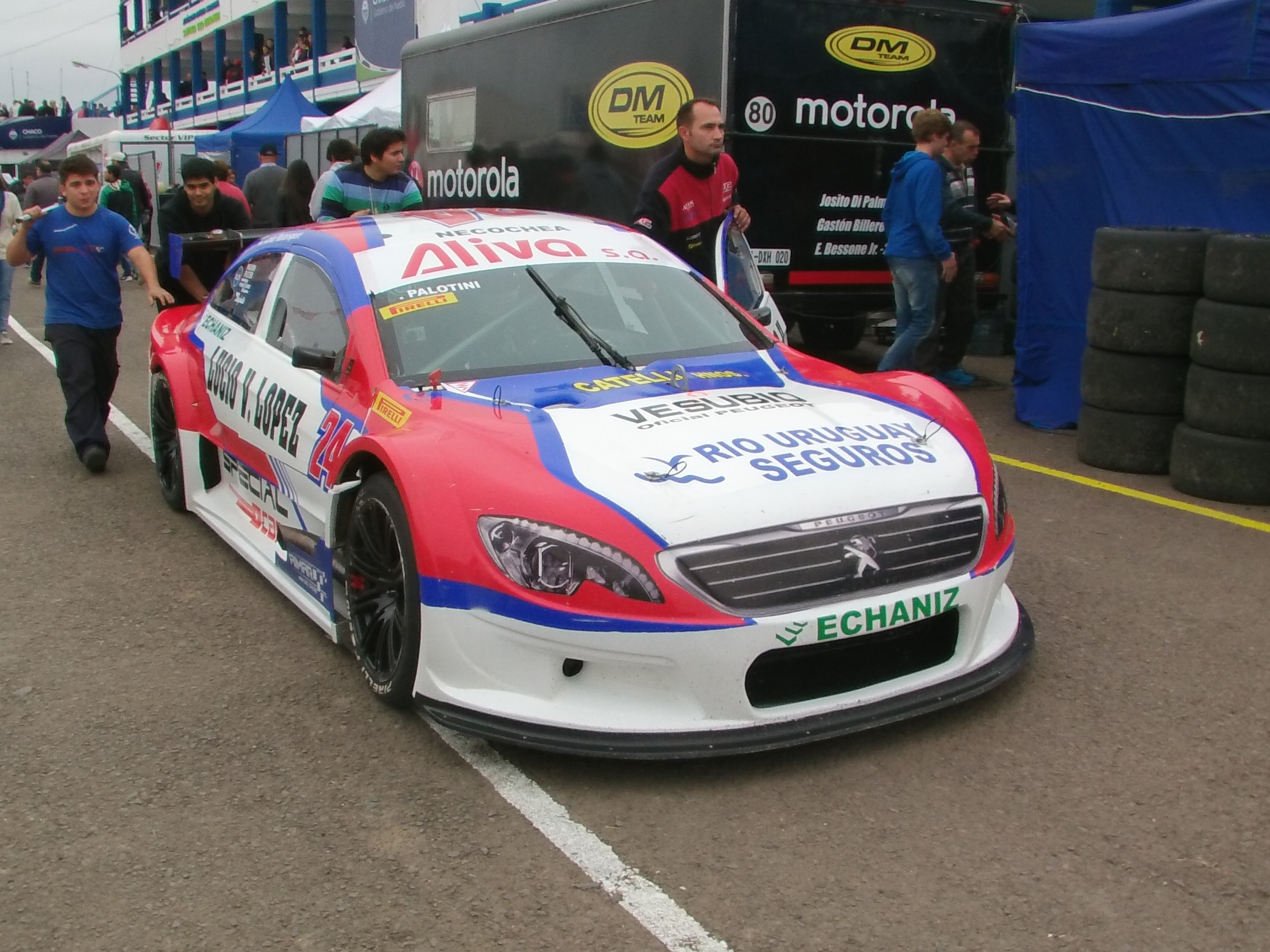
Peugeot of Top Race Series

The points are given in the following order:

Position	Points	Position	Points
1	18	8	8
2	16	9	7
3	14	10	6
3	12	11	5
4	12	12	4
5	11	13	3
6	10	14	2
7	9	15 to 20	1

== Video Game ==
There was a Top Race v6 video game made in 2009 based on the racing series.
