= 2011 TC 2000 Championship =

Seasons
- ← 2010 2012 →

The 2011 TC 2000 Championship was the 33rd Turismo Competicion 2000 season. It began on 13 March and ended on 27 November after 12 races. Matías Rossi won the championship for Toyota Team Argentina.

== Teams and drivers ==
| Team | Car | | No. | Driver | Rounds |
|---|---|---|---|---|---|
| Ford-YPF | Ford | Ford Focus | 1 | (Argentina) Norberto Fontana | All |
| Ford-YPF | Ford | Ford Focus | 1 | (Brazil) Marcos Gomes | 8 |
| Ford-YPF | Ford | Ford Focus | 2 | (Argentina) Juan Manuel Silva | All |
| Ford-YPF | Ford | Ford Focus | 2 | (Argentina) Jorge Trebbiani | 8 |
| Ford-YPF | Ford | Ford Focus | 19 | (Argentina) Fabián Yannantuoni | All |
| Ford-YPF | Ford | Ford Focus | 19 | (Argentina) Juan Batista de Benedictis | 8 |
| Equipo Petrobras | Honda | Honda Civic | 3 | (Argentina) Leonel Pernía | All |
| Equipo Petrobras | Honda | Honda Civic | 3 | (Argentina) Omar Martínez | 8 |
| Equipo Petrobras | Honda | Honda Civic | 4 | (Argentina) Mariano Altuna | All |
| Equipo Petrobras | Honda | Honda Civic | 4 | (Brazil) Juliano Moro | 8 |
| Equipo Petrobras | Honda | Honda Civic | 9 | (Argentina) Néstor Girolami | All |
| Equipo Petrobras | Honda | Honda Civic | 9 | (Argentina) Matías Russo | 8 |
| Equipo Petrobras | Honda | Honda Civic | 10 | (Argentina) Nazareno López | All |
| Equipo Petrobras | Honda | Honda Civic | 10 | (Argentina) Gustavo Micheloud | 8 |
| Toyota Team Argentina | Toyota | Toyota Corolla | 5 | (Argentina) Mariano Werner | All |
| Toyota Team Argentina | Toyota | Toyota Corolla | 5 | (Argentina) Esteban Guerrieri | 8 |
| Toyota Team Argentina | Toyota | Toyota Corolla | 6 | (Argentina) Matías Rossi | All |
| Toyota Team Argentina | Toyota | Toyota Corolla | 6 | (Argentina) Martín Basso | 8 |
| Toyota Team Argentina | Toyota | Toyota Corolla | 20 | (Argentina) Bernardo Llaver | All |
| Toyota Team Argentina | Toyota | Toyota Corolla | 20 | (Brazil) Ricardo Maurício | 8 |
| Toyota Team Argentina | Toyota | Toyota Corolla | 21 | (Argentina) Ignacio Char | All |
| Toyota Team Argentina | Toyota | Toyota Corolla | 21 | (Argentina) Camilo Echevarría | 8 |
| Equipo Fiat Oil Combustibles | Fiat | Fiat Linea | 7 | (Argentina) Emiliano Spataro | All |
| Equipo Fiat Oil Combustibles | Fiat | Fiat Linea | 7 | (Brazil) Cacá Bueno | 8 |
| Equipo Fiat Oil Combustibles | Fiat | Fiat Linea | 8 | (Argentina) Gabriel Ponce de León | All |
| Equipo Fiat Oil Combustibles | Fiat | Fiat Linea | 8 | (Argentina) Emanuel Moriatis | 8 |
| Equipo Fiat Oil Combustibles | Fiat | Fiat Linea | 36 | (Argentina) Emiliano López | All |
| Equipo Fiat Oil Combustibles | Fiat | Fiat Linea | 36 | (Argentina) Ezequiel Bosio | 8 |
| Equipo Fiat Oil Combustibles | Fiat | Fiat Linea | 37 | (Argentina) José María López | All |
| Equipo Fiat Oil Combustibles | Fiat | Fiat Linea | 37 | (Argentina) Diego Aventín | 8 |
| Equipo Official Chevrolet | Chevrolet | Chevrolet Vectra | 11 | (Argentina) Christian Ledesma | 1–2 |
| Equipo Official Chevrolet | Chevrolet | Chevrolet Vectra | 12 | (Argentina) Agustín Canapino | 1–2 |
| Equipo Official Chevrolet | Chevrolet | Chevrolet Cruze | 11 | (Argentina) Christian Ledesma | 3–12 |
| Equipo Official Chevrolet | Chevrolet | Chevrolet Cruze | 11 | (Switzerland) Alain Menu | 8 |
| Equipo Official Chevrolet | Chevrolet | Chevrolet Cruze | 12 | (Argentina) Agustín Canapino | 3–12 |
| Equipo Official Chevrolet | Chevrolet | Chevrolet Cruze | 12 | (United Kingdom) Robert Huff | 8 |
| Peugeot Cobra Team | Peugeot | Peugeot 307 | 14 | (Argentina) Facundo Ardusso | All |
| Peugeot Cobra Team | Peugeot | Peugeot 307 | 14 | (Argentina) Ricardo Risatti | 8 |
| Peugeot Cobra Team | Peugeot | Peugeot 307 | 15 | (Argentina) Juan Cruz Álvarez | All |
| Peugeot Cobra Team | Peugeot | Peugeot 307 | 15 | (France) Nicolas Minassian | 8 |
| Peugeot Cobra Team | Peugeot | Peugeot 307 | 26 | (Argentina) Matías Muñoz Marchesi | All |
| Peugeot Cobra Team | Peugeot | Peugeot 307 | 26 | (Argentina) Marcelo Bugliotti | 8 |
| Renault Lo Jack Team | Renault | Renault Fluence | 16 | (Argentina) Mauro Giallombardo | All |
| Renault Lo Jack Team | Renault | Renault Fluence | 16 | (Argentina) Carlos Okulovich | 8 |
| Renault Lo Jack Team | Renault | Renault Fluence | 17 | (Argentina) Guillermo Ortelli | All |
| Renault Lo Jack Team | Renault | Renault Fluence | 17 | (Argentina) Luis José Di Palma | 8 |
| | Ford | Ford Focus | 24 | (Argentina) Alejandro González | 11 |
| | Ford | Ford Focus | 25 | (Argentina) Leandro Carducci | 2–12 |
| | Ford | Ford Focus | 25 | (Argentina) Ernesto Bessone | 8 |
| Lanus Motorsport | Peugeot | Peugeot 307 | 28 | (Argentina) Daniel Belli | All |
| Lanus Motorsport | Peugeot | Peugeot 307 | 28 | (Argentina) Adrián Chiriano | 8 |
| Fineschi Racing | Honda | Honda Civic | 30 | (Argentina) Javier Manta | All |
| Fineschi Racing | Honda | Honda Civic | 30 | (Argentina) Esteban Gini | 8 |
| Fineschi Racing | Honda | Honda Civic | 31 | (Argentina) Oscar Fineschi | 8–9 |
| Fineschi Racing | Honda | Honda Civic | 31 | (Argentina) Pablo Otero | 8 |
| Fineschi Racing | Honda | Honda Civic | 31 | (Argentina) Alejandro Chahwan | 10–11 |
| JM Motorsports | Volkswagen | Volkswagen Bora | 32 | (Argentina) Gonzalo Fernández | 1–5, 7 |
| JM Motorsports | Volkswagen | Volkswagen Bora | 32 | (Argentina) Rubén Salerno | 8–9, 11 |
| JM Motorsports | Volkswagen | Volkswagen Bora | 32 | (Argentina) Jorge Cersócimo | 8, 10 |
| JM Motorsports | Volkswagen | Volkswagen Bora | 32 | (Argentina) Nicolas Traut | 12 |
| JM Motorsports | Volkswagen | Volkswagen Bora | 33 | (Argentina) Rubén Salerno | 1–7, 12 |
| JM Motorsports | Volkswagen | Volkswagen Bora | 33 | (Argentina) Gonzalo Fernández | 8–11 |
| JM Motorsports | Volkswagen | Volkswagen Bora | 33 | (Argentina) Juan Manuel Centurión | 8 |
| Escuderia Rio de la Plata; Orbis Seguros Racing | Honda | Honda Civic | 34 | (Argentina) Leonel Larrauri | 1–6 |
| Escuderia Rio de la Plata; Orbis Seguros Racing | Honda | Honda Civic | 34 | (Argentina) Franco Coscia | 7–9 |
| Escuderia Rio de la Plata; Orbis Seguros Racing | Honda | Honda Civic | 34 | (Argentina) Fabricio Pezzini | 8, 11 |
| Escuderia Rio de la Plata; Orbis Seguros Racing | Honda | Honda Civic | 34 | (Argentina) Bruno Marioni | 10 |
| Escuderia Rio de la Plata; Orbis Seguros Racing | Honda | Honda Civic | 34 | (Argentina) Francisco Bugliotti | 12 |
| Escuderia Rio de la Plata; Orbis Seguros Racing | Honda | Honda Civic | 35 | (Argentina) Franco Coscia | 1–6 |
| Escuderia Rio de la Plata; Orbis Seguros Racing | Honda | Honda Civic | 35 | (Argentina) Damian Fineschi | 7–12 |
| Escuderia Rio de la Plata; Orbis Seguros Racing | Honda | Honda Civic | 35 | (Argentina) Germán Suárez | 8 |
| Riva Racing | Honda | Honda Civic | 38 | (Argentina) Nicolas Traut | 1–3, 6–8 |
| Riva Racing | Honda | Honda Civic | 38 | (Argentina) Nicolás Ursprung | 8 |
| Riva Racing | Honda | Honda Civic | 38 | (Argentina) Daniel Collazo | 10–12 |
| Riva Racing | Honda | Honda Civic | 39 | (Argentina) Franco Riva | 3–12 |
| Riva Racing | Honda | Honda Civic | 39 | (Argentina) Fernando Etchegorry | 8 |
| Sportteam Competición | Renault | Renault Fluence | 40 | (Argentina) Guido Falaschi | 1–11 |
| Sportteam Competición | Renault | Renault Fluence | 40 | (Argentina) Esteban Tuero | 8 |
| Sportteam Competición | Renault | Renault Fluence | 41 | (Argentina) Martín Serrano | All |
| Sportteam Competición | Renault | Renault Fluence | 41 | (Brazil) Hoover Orsi | 8 |
| Uruguay en Carrera | Peugeot | Peugeot 307 | 46 | (Uruguay) Daniel Fresnedo | 1–6, 8, 11 |
| Uruguay en Carrera | Peugeot | Peugeot 307 | 46 | (Uruguay) Ignacio Moreira | 8 |
| Uruguay en Carrera | Peugeot | Peugeot 307 | 46 | (Uruguay) Federico Ensslin | 9–10 |
| Vitelli Competición | Renault | Renault Mégane | 48 | (Argentina) Eduardo Bracco | All |
| Vitelli Competición | Renault | Renault Mégane | 48 | (Argentina) Gustavo der Ohannessian | 8 |
| Vitelli Competición | Renault | Renault Mégane | 49 | (Argentina) Sebastián Martínez | All |
| Vitelli Competición | Renault | Renault Mégane | 49 | (Argentina) Alejandro Chawan | 8 |
| JP Racing | Chevrolet | Chevrolet Vectra | 50 | (Argentina) Pedro Gentile | 7–11 |
| JP Racing | Chevrolet | Chevrolet Vectra | 50 | (Argentina) Gastón Crusitta | 8 |

== Race calendar and results ==
| Round | Circuit, location | Date | Pole position | Qualifying race winners | | Fastest lap | Race winner |
|---|---|---|---|---|---|---|---|
| 1 | (Argentina) Autódromo Parque Ciudad, General Roca, Río Negro | March 13 | (Argentina) Mariano Altuna | (Argentina) Bernardo Llaver | (Argentina) Juan Manuel Silva | (Argentina) Guillermo Ortelli | (Argentina) Juan Manuel Silva |
| 2 | (Argentina) Streets of Santa Fe, Santa Fe | April 9 | (Argentina) Mariano Werner | not held | | (Argentina) Christian Ledesma | (Argentina) Mariano Altuna |
| 2 | (Argentina) Streets of Santa Fe, Santa Fe | April 10 | (Argentina) Emiliano Spataro | not held | | (Argentina) Matías Rossi | (Argentina) Emiliano Spataro |
| 3 | (Argentina) Autódromo Jorge Ángel Pena, San Martin-Mendoza | May 1 | (Argentina) Emiliano Spataro | (Argentina) Guillermo Ortelli | (Argentina) José María López | (Argentina) Guillermo Ortelli | (Argentina) Guillermo Ortelli |
| 4 | (Argentina) Autódromo Eduardo Copello, San Juan-San Juan | May 22 | (Argentina) Emiliano Spataro | (Argentina) Matías Rossi | (Argentina) Norberto Fontana | (Argentina) Matías Rossi | (Argentina) Matías Rossi |
| 5 | (Argentina) Autódromo Santiago Yaco Guarnieri, Resistencia-Chaco | June 5 | (Argentina) Matías Rossi | (Argentina) Matías Rossi | (Argentina) Mariano Werner | (Argentina) Matías Rossi | (Argentina) Matías Rossi |
| 6 | (Argentina) Autódromo Oscar Cabalén, Alta Gracia-Córdoba | June 26 | (Argentina) Agustín Canapino | (Argentina) Agustín Canapino | (Argentina) José María López | (Argentina) Emiliano Spataro | (Argentina) Agustín Canapino |
| 7 | (Argentina) Autódromo Termas de Río Hondo, Santiago del Estero | July 17 | (Argentina) Matías Rossi | (Argentina) Guido Falaschi | (Argentina) Christian Ledesma | (Argentina) Guido Falaschi | (Argentina) Guido Falaschi |
| 8 | (Argentina) Autódromo Roberto José Mouras, La Plata | August 21 | (Argentina) Mariano Werner (Argentina) Esteban Guerrieri | not held | | (Argentina) Mariano Werner (Argentina) Esteban Guerrieri | (Argentina) Mariano Werner (Argentina) Esteban Guerrieri |
| 9 | (Argentina) Autódromo Mar y Valle, Trelew | September 11 | (Argentina) José María López | (Argentina) Agustín Canapino | (Argentina) Fabián Yannantuoni | (Argentina) Agustín Canapino | (Argentina) Agustín Canapino |
| 10 | (Argentina) Autódromo Eusebio Marcilla, Junín, Buenos Aires Province | October 2 | (Argentina) José María López | (Argentina) José María López | | (Argentina) José María López | (Argentina) José María López |
| 11 | (Argentina) Potrero de los Funes Circuit, San Luis | November 6 | (Argentina) Agustín Canapino | (Argentina) Facundo Ardusso | (Argentina) Fabián Yannantuoni | (Argentina) Fabián Yannantuoni | (Argentina) Fabián Yannantuoni |
| 12 | (Argentina) Autódromo Ciudad de Paraná, Paraná, Entre Ríos | November 27 | (Argentina) Matías Rossi | not held | | (Argentina) Juan Manuel Silva | (Argentina) Matías Rossi |

== Championship standings ==
- Points were awarded as follows:

| | 1 | 2 | 3 | 4 | 5 | 6 | 7 | 8 | 9 | 10 | 11 | 12 | 13 | 14 | 15 | PP |
|---|---|---|---|---|---|---|---|---|---|---|---|---|---|---|---|---|
| Qualifying race (Note: Two races at each event except Santa Fe, Buenos Aires, Junín and Paraná.) | 5 | 4 | 3 | 2 | 1 | 0 | | | | | | | | | | 0 |
| Regular final (Note: General Roca, San Martín, Córdoba, Río Hondo, Trelew and San Luis.) | 26 | 21 | 18 | 16 | 14 | 12 | 10 | 8 | 7 | 6 | 5 | 4 | 3 | 2 | 1 | 1 |
| Special final (Note: Santa Fe (half points), El Zonda, Resistencia, Junín and Paraná.) | 30 | 24 | 20 | 17 | 16 | 15 | 14 | 13 | 12 | 10 | 8 | 6 | 4 | 2 | 1 | 1 |
| Buenos Aires 200 km | 34 | 29 | 25 | 22 | 20 | 18 | 16 | 14 | 12 | 10 | 8 | 6 | 4 | 2 | 1 | 1 |

| Pos | Driver | GRN | SFE | | SMM | ZON | SYG | OCA | TRH | MOU | TRE | JUN | POT | PAR | Points |
|---|---|---|---|---|---|---|---|---|---|---|---|---|---|---|---|
| 1 | (Argentina) Matías Rossi | 4 | 2 | 4 | 2 | 1 | **1** | 5 | **11** | Ret | 8 | 7 | Ret | **1** | 197.5 |
| 2 | (Argentina) Mariano Werner | 6 | **Ret** | 8 | Ret | 3 | 2 | 15 | 4 | **1** | 3 | 4 | 10 | 7 | 182.5 |
| 3 | (Argentina) Leonel Pernía | 7 | 6 | 2 | 5 | 4 | 3 | 9 | 5 | 3 | 6 | 5 | 7 | 17 | 170.5 |
| 4 | (Argentina) Agustín Canapino | 8 | DNS | DNS | Ret | 12 | 12 | **1** | 12 | Ret | 1 | 6 | **3** | 2 | 151 |
| 5 | (Argentina) José María López | 17 | DNS | DNS | Ret | Ret | 6 | 6 | 3 | 2 | **9** | **1** | Ret | 3 | 149 |
| 6 | (Argentina) Juan Manuel Silva | 1 | 7 | 12 | 8 | 6 | Ret | Ret | 8 | 16 | 7 | 3 | 4 | 6 | 138 |
| 7 | (Argentina) Emiliano Spataro | 10 | 3 | **1** | **Ret** | Ret | 8 | 2 | 9 | 7 | 10 | 2 | Ret | 9 | 137 |
| 8 | (Argentina) Guillermo Ortelli | 22 | 9 | Ret | 1 | Ret | 4 | 7 | 7 | 5 | 15 | 10 | 13 | 10 | 122 |
| 9 | (Argentina) Fabián Yannantuoni | 3 | 5 | 3 | Ret | 13 | Ret | 11 | 17 | 11 | 4 | 25 | 1 | Ret | 109 |
| 10 | (Argentina) Mariano Altuna | **5** | 1 | 5 | 7 | 9 | 5 | 10 | 18 | 13 | 20 | 15 | 8 | 11 | 105 |
| 11 | (Argentina) Norberto Fontana | Ret | Ret | 7 | 10 | 2 | 9 | 22 | 13 | 10 | 5 | 9 | 29 | 8 | 104 |
| 12 | (Argentina) Gabriel Ponce de León | 9 | 13 | 20 | 6 | 5 | 11 | 4 | 15 | 21 | 13 | 20 | 6 | 5 | 101 |
| 13 | (Argentina) Guido Falaschi | Ret | Ret | 15 | 3 | 8 | Ret | 12 | 1 | 9 | 17 | 14 | DSQ | | 85.5 |
| 14 | (Argentina) Christian Ledesma | 18 | 4 | Ret | 11 | 14 | Ret | 3 | 2 | 27 | 11 | 11 | 15 | 29 | 80.5 |
| 15 | (Argentina) Néstor Girolami | 11 | 8 | 22 | Ret | Ret | 10 | 14 | 6 | 19 | 2 | 13 | 9 | Ret | 76.5 |
| 16 | (Argentina) Facundo Ardusso | 14 | Ret | Ret | 16 | 10 | Ret | 21 | 14 | Ret | 22 | 8 | 2 | 4 | 71 |
| 17 | (Argentina) Mauro Giallombardo | Ret | 11 | 13 | 4 | 16 | 18 | Ret | Ret | 6 | 30 | 17 | 5 | Ret | 63 |
| 18 | (Argentina) Bernardo Llaver | Ret | 10 | 6 | 13 | 11 | 7 | Ret | 10 | 14 | 18 | 12 | 16 | 14 | 61.5 |
| 19 | (Argentina) Juan Cruz Álvarez | 19 | Ret | 9 | 17 | 7 | 14 | 8 | 16 | 12 | Ret | 16 | 14 | 12 | 46 |
| 20 | (Argentina) Matías Muñoz Marchesi | 2 | 12 | 19 | 9 | 17 | 27 | Ret | 23 | 15 | 14 | 19 | 12 | 28 | 42 |
| 21 | (Argentina) Ignacio Char | 12 | Ret | 17 | 14 | Ret | 13 | Ret | 19 | 4 | 12 | 21 | 11 | 16 | 42 |
| 22 | (Argentina) Martín Serrano | Ret | 15 | 14 | Ret | 18 | Ret | 13 | Ret | Ret | 16 | Ret | 23 | 13 | 16.5 |
| 23 | (Argentina) Emiliano López | Ret | DNS | Ret | Ret | 15 | 16 | 16 | 20 | 8 | 25 | Ret | 19 | 30 | 15 |
| 24 | (Argentina) Franco Coscia | 13 | 14 | 10 | 18 | 19 | 20 | 17 | 21 | 20 | 24 | | | | 9 |
| 25 | (Argentina) Damian Fineschi | | | | | | | | 27 | 17 | 21 | 18 | Ret | 25 | 4 |
| 26 | (Argentina) Daniel Belli | 16 | Ret | 11 | Ret | Ret | 23 | Ret | 25 | 18 | Ret | 31 | 25 | 18 | 4 |
| 27 | (Argentina) Leonel Larrauri | Ret | 18 | Ret | 12 | 20 | 17 | Ret | | | | | | | 4 |
| 28 | (Argentina) Leandro Carducci | | 17 | Ret | 15 | Ret | 15 | 23 | 22 | 26 | 23 | 24 | 30 | 15 | 3 |
| 29 | (Argentina) Nazareno López | 15 | 20 | Ret | 19 | 22 | 19 | DNS | 29 | 22 | 19 | 22 | 21 | 26 | 1 |
| 30 | (Argentina) Franco Riva | | | | 20 | 21 | 21 | Ret | Ret | 24 | 29 | 23 | 18 | 19 | 0 |
| 31 | (Argentina) Javier Manta | Ret | Ret | Ret | 23 | 23 | Ret | Ret | 30 | Ret | 26 | Ret | 24 | 22 | 0 |
| 32 | (Argentina) Fabricio Pezzini | | | | | | | | | 20 | | | 17 | | 0 |
| 33 | (Argentina) Rubén Salerno | Ret | 16 | 16 | 21 | 24 | 24 | 19 | 26 | Ret | Ret | | Ret | 23 | 0 |
| 34 | (Uruguay) Daniel Fresnedo | 23 | Ret | Ret | 22 | DNS | 22 | 18 | | Ret | | | 20 | | 0 |
| 35 | (Argentina) Pedro Gentile | | | | | | | | 24 | Ret | Ret | Ret | Ret | | 0 |
| 36 | (Uruguay) Federico Ensslin | | | | | | | | | | Ret | Ret | | | 0 |
| 37 | (Argentina) Gonzalo Fernández | 21 | Ret | 21 | Ret | 25 | Ret | | 32 | 25 | 28 | 28 | 22 | | 0 |
| 38 | (Argentina) Nicolas Traut | Ret | 19 | Ret | Ret | | | 24 | 31 | 28 | | | | 27 | 0 |
| 39 | (Argentina) Oscar Fineschi | | | | | | | | | 23 | DNS | | | | 0 |
| 40 | (Argentina) Sebastián Martínez | Ret | Ret | Ret | Ret | Ret | 25 | Ret | 28 | Ret | 27 | 29 | 27 | 24 | 0 |
| 41 | (Argentina) Eduardo Bracco | 20 | Ret | 18 | 24 | 26 | 26 | 20 | Ret | Ret | Ret | 26 | Ret | 21 | 0 |
| 42 | (Argentina) Daniel Collazo | | | | | | | | | | | 30 | 28 | Ret | 0 |
| 43 | (Argentina) Alejandro Chahwan | | | | | | | | | | | 27 | 26 | | 0 |
| 44 | (Argentina) Francesco Bugliotti | | | | | | | | | | | | | 20 | 0 |
| | (Argentina) Jorge Cersósimo | | | | | | | | | Ret | | Ret | | | 0 |
| | (Argentina) Alejandro González | | | | | | | | | | | | Ret | | 0 |
| | (Argentina) Bruno Marioni | | | | | | | | | | | Ret | | | 0 |
| Pos | Driver | GRN | SFE | | SMM | ZON | SYG | OCA | TRH | MOU | TRE | JUN | POT | PAR | Points |

| Colour | Result |
|---|---|
| Gold | Winner |
| Silver | Second place |
| Bronze | Third place |
| Green | Points classification |
| Blue | Non-points classification |
| Blue | Non-classified finish (NC) |
| Purple | Retired, not classified (Ret) |
| Red | Did not qualify (DNQ) |
| Red | Did not pre-qualify (DNPQ) |
| Black | Disqualified (DSQ) |
| White | Did not start (DNS) |
| White | Withdrew (WD) |
| White | Race cancelled (C) |
| Blank | Did not practice (DNP) |
| Blank | Did not arrive (DNA) |
| Blank | Excluded (EX) |

**Bold** - Pole
Italics - Fastest lap
