= 2016 Súper TC2000 =

Seasons
- ← 2015 2017 →

The 2016 Super TC2000 was the fifth season of the series, founded in 2012 and since that year was categorized as divisional major, compared to its pair TC2000.

== Calendar ==
Event	Circuit	Date
1	(Chubut Province) Autódromo Mar y Valle, Trelew	20 March
2	(Santa Fe Province) Autódromo Municipal Juan Manuel Fangio, Rosario	10 April
3	(Mendoza Province) Autódromo Jorge Ángel Pena, San Martín	8 May
4	(Córdoba Province, Argentina) Autódromo Oscar Cabalén, Alta Gracia	29 May
5	(Santiago del Estero Province) Autódromo Termas de Río Hondo, Termas de Río Hondo	19 June
6	(Misiones Province) Autódromo Ciudad de Oberá, Oberá	3 July
7	Autódromo Oscar y Juan Gálvez, Buenos Aires	31 July
8	(Santa Fe Province) Santa Fe Street Circuit, Santa Fe	4 September
9	(La Pampa Province) Autódromo Provincia de La Pampa, Toay	25 September
10	(San Juan Province, Argentina) Autódromo Eduardo Copello, Quebrada de Zonda	23 October
11	(Río Negro Province) Autódromo Parque Ciudad de General Roca, General Roca	6 November
12	(Córdoba Province, Argentina) Autódromo Oscar Cabalén, Alta Gracia	27 November

== Teams and drivers ==
All teams and drivers were registered in Argentina.

Team	Car	No.	Driver	Rounds
Team Peugeot Total Argentina	Peugeot 408	0	Mariano Werner	All
Team Peugeot Total Argentina	Peugeot 408	2	Fabián Yannantuoni	All
Team Peugeot Total Argentina	Peugeot 408	19	Damián Fineschi	All
Team Peugeot Total Argentina	Peugeot 408	20	Facundo Chapur	2–12
Renault Sport	Renault Fluence	3	Leonel Pernía	All
Renault Sport	Renault Fluence	4	Facundo Ardusso	All
Renault Sport	Renault Fluence	11	Emiliano Spataro	All
Renault Sport	Renault Fluence	12	Christian Ledesma	All
Renault Sport	Renault Fluence	21	Ignacio Julián	All
Renault Sport	Renault Fluence	22	Germán Sirvent	All
Equipo Chevrolet YPF-Pro Racing	Chevrolet Cruze	5	Agustín Canapino	All
Equipo Chevrolet YPF-Pro Racing	Chevrolet Cruze	6	Norberto Fontana	All
Equipo Chevrolet YPF-Pro Racing	Chevrolet Cruze	13	Matías Muñoz Marchesi	All
Equipo Chevrolet YPF-Pro Racing	Chevrolet Cruze	14	Manuel Mallo	All
Equipo Chevrolet YPF-Pro Racing	Chevrolet Cruze	27	Facundo Conta	All
Toyota Team Argentina	Toyota Corolla	7	Matías Rossi	All
Toyota Team Argentina	Toyota Corolla	8	Esteban Guerrieri	All
Toyota Team Argentina	Toyota Corolla	17	Rafael Morgenstern	All
Toyota Team Argentina	Toyota Corolla	18	Matías Milla	All
Fiat Petronas	Fiat Linea	9	José Manuel Urcera	All
Fiat Petronas	Fiat Linea	10	Carlos Javier Merlo	All
Fiat Petronas	Fiat Linea	31	Bernardo Llaver	All
Escudería FE	Peugeot 408	15	Lucas Colombo Russell	All
Escudería FE	Peugeot 408	16	Lucas Benamo	All
Escudería FE	Peugeot 408	25	Javier Manta	All
Escudería FE	Peugeot 408	26	Luciano Farroni	All
Riva Racing	Ford Focus	23	Franco Riva	5–9
Riva Racing	Ford Focus	24	Gustavo Michelound	11–12
JM Motorsport	Chevrolet Cruze	33	Federico Braga	7
M&M Group	Fiat Linea	87	Bruno Etman	1–6, 8–12
M&M Group	Fiat Linea	87	Fabricio Pezzini	7

200 km de Buenos Aires
Team	No	Season driver	Wildcard driver
Team Peugeot Total Argentina	0	(Argentina) Mariano Werner	(Argentina) Néstor Girolami
Team Peugeot Total Argentina	2	(Argentina) Fabián Yannatuoni	(Argentina) Matías Rodríguez
Team Peugeot Total Argentina	19	(Argentina) Damían Fineschi	(Brazil) Galid Osman
Team Peugeot Total Argentina	20	(Argentina) Facundo Chapur	(Brazil) Ricardo Mauricio
Renault Sport	3	(Argentina) Leonel Pernía	(Argentina) Julián Santero
Renault Sport	4	(Argentina) Facundo Ardusso	(Argentina) Franco Vivian
Renault Sport	11	(Argentina) Emiliano Spataro	(Argentina) Luis José di Palma
Renault Sport	12	(Argentina) Christian Ledesma	(Argentina) Mauro Giallombardo
Renault Sport	21	(Argentina) Ignacio Julián	(Argentina) Humberto Krujoski
Renault Sport	22	(Argentina) Germán Sirvent	(Uruguay) Gerardo Salaverría
Equipo Chevrolet YPF-Pro Racing	5	(Argentina) Agustín Canapino	(Argentina) Guillermo Ortelli
Equipo Chevrolet YPF-Pro Racing	6	(Argentina) Norberto Fontana	(Brazil) Daniel Serra
Equipo Chevrolet YPF-Pro Racing	13	(Argentina) Matías Muñoz Marchesi	(Argentina) Augusto Scalbi
Equipo Chevrolet YPF-Pro Racing	14	(Argentina) Manuel Mallo	(Argentina) Diego Azar
Equipo Chevrolet YPF-Pro Racing	27	(Argentina) Facundo Conta	(Argentina) Marcelo Ciarrocchi
Toyota Team Argentina	7	(Argentina) Matías Rossi	(Argentina) Gabriel Ponce de León
Toyota Team Argentina	8	(Argentina) Esteban Guerrieri	(Brazil) Ricardo Zonta
Toyota Team Argentina	17	(Argentina) Rafael Morgenstern	(Argentina) Ricardo Risatti III
Toyota Team Argentina	18	(Argentina) Matías Milla	(Argentina) Franco Girolami
Fiat Petronas	9	(Argentina) José Manuel Urcera	(Brazil) Valdeno Brito
Fiat Petronas	10	(Argentina) Carlos Javier Merlo	(Argentina) Martín Moggia
Fiat Petronas	10	(Argentina) Bernardo Llaver	(Argentina) Emmanuel Cáceres
FE Peugeot Junior Equipe	15	(Argentina) Lucas Colombo Russell	(Argentina) Facundo Regalia
FE Peugeot Junior Equipe	16	(Argentina) Lucas Benamo	(Argentina) Esteban Tuero
FE Peugeot Junior Equipe	25	(Argentina) Javier Manta	(Argentina) Oscar Fineschi
FE Peugeot Junior Equipe	26	(Argentina) Luciano Farroni	(Netherlands) Tom Coronel
Riva Racing	23	(Argentina) Franco Riva	(Argentina) Franco Coscia
JM Motorsport	33	(Argentina) Federico Braga	(Argentina) Hugo Ballester
M&M Group	87	(Argentina) Fabricio Pezzini	(Argentina) Luciano Ventricelli

== Championships ==
=== Drivers ===
Pos	Driver	TRE (Chubut Province)	ROS (Santa Fe Province)	SMM (Mendoza Province)	AGC (Córdoba Province, Argentina)	TRH (Santiago del Estero Province)	OBE (Misiones Province)	BUE (Buenos Aires)	SFE (Santa Fe Province)		TOA (La Pampa Province)	SJU (San Juan Province, Argentina)	GRO (Río Negro Province)		AGC (Córdoba Province, Argentina)	Pts
1	(Argentina) Agustín Canapino	4	2	4	10	13	3	1	1	1	6	Ret	3	2	1	248
2	(Argentina) Matías Rossi	Ret	1	6	22†	11	21†	2	6	7	5	3	1	1	6	196,5
3	(Argentina) Facundo Ardusso	7	7	1	8	3	6	5	2	18†	10	4	20†	4	5	195
4	(Argentina) Leonel Pernía	9	4	7	3	10	5	9	18†	3	8	7	2	8	2	180,5
5	(Argentina) Mariano Werner	22†	5	8	12	12	4	20†	4	4	4	5	4	7	4	160
6	(Argentina) Emiliano Spataro	1	6	Ret	6	9	11	Ret	3	2	Ret	6	5	6	14	140
7	(Argentina) Esteban Guerrieri	6	14	13	5	Ret	9	8	Ret	11	3	1	12	Ret	Ret	111,5
8	(Argentina) Bernardo Llaver	11	8	10	21†	14	1	19†	DNS	14	1	Ret	8	3	13	110,5
9	(Argentina) Norberto Fontana	2	9	3	13	7	10	17†	5	Ret	11	9	13	10	10	108
10	(Argentina) José Manuel Urcera	Ret	16	17†	1	17†	2	Ret	Ret	Ret	2	DSQ	18	15	7	106
11	(Argentina) Damián Fineschi	5	10	Ret	4	5	7	13	9	6	9	10	10	16	15†	105
12	(Argentina) Carlos Merlo	3	Ret	5	7	Ret	Ret	18†	7	Ret	7	Ret	6	11	3	104
13	(Argentina) Matías Milla	13	3	DSQ	11	2	Ret	10	10	Ret	20	8	7	13	9	99,5
14	(Argentina) Facundo Chapur		11	Ret	2	DSQ	8	Ret	13	5	23	2	Ret	5	20†	83
15	(Argentina) Fabián Yannantuoni	12	Ret	2	Ret	1	20†	Ret	11	10	15	Ret	Ret	12	Ret	66
16	(Argentina) Christian Ledesma	8	Ret	Ret	18	Ret	Ret	3	15	Ret	Ret	Ret	15	9	21†	41
17	(Argentina) Matías Muñoz Marchesi	16	12	9	Ret	Ret	14	4	Ret	13	17	Ret	Ret	Ret	17	36
18	(Argentina) Germán Sirvent	14	15	11	9	Ret	Ret	11	8	DSQ	13	11	Ret	20	Ret	35,5
19	(Argentina) Luciano Farroni	Ret	Ret	15	17	8	15	7	DSQ	12	12	DNS	21†	19	Ret	32
20	(Argentina) Ignacio Julián	17	17	Ret	15	Ret	12	Ret	Ret	9	Ret	Ret	9	17	8	31
21	(Argentina) Manuel Mallo	20	13	16	14	4	13	15†	Ret	15	21	Ret	17	21	22†	28
22	(Argentina) Fabricio Pezzini							6								18
23	(Argentina) Rafael Morgenstern	Ret	Ret	14	Ret	Ret	17	Ret	12	DSQ	24†	16	11	18	11	16,5
24	(Argentina) Lucas Colombo Russell	21†	Ret	Ret	Ret	Ret	19†	Ret	14	Ret	14	12	Ret	14	12	16
25	(Argentina) Javier Manta	18	18	DNS	Ret	6	16	16	Ret	17	DNS	14	DSQ	24	Ret	15
26	(Argentina) Facundo Conta	15	Ret	12	19	16	Ret	12	Ret	16	18	15	19	26	18†	12
27	(Argentina) Lucas Benamo	19	Ret	Ret	16	Ret	18	21†	16	8	16	13	14	25	19†	7,5
28	(Argentina) Bruno Etman	10	Ret	Ret	20	15	Ret		17	Ret	19	DSQ	Ret	22	16	7
29	(Argentina) Franco Riva					18†	Ret	14	Ret	Ret	22					2
	(Argentina) Federico Braga							Ret								0
Guest drivers ineligible for championship points
	(Argentina) Gustavo Micheloud												16	23	DSQ	
Pos	Driver	TRE (Chubut Province)	ROS (Santa Fe Province)	SMM (Mendoza Province)	AGC (Córdoba Province, Argentina)	TRH (Santiago del Estero Province)	OBE (Misiones Province)	BUE (Buenos Aires)	SFE (Santa Fe Province)		TOA (La Pampa Province)	SJU (San Juan Province, Argentina)	GRO (Río Negro Province)		AGC (Córdoba Province, Argentina)	Pts

=== Teams ===
Pos	Team	Points
1	Renault Sport	486
2	Toyota Team Argentina	390.5
3	Equipo Chevrolet YPF	396
4	Team Peugeot Total Argentina	369.5
5	Fiat Petronas	306.5
6	FE Peugeot Junior Equipe	68.5
7	M&M Group	25
8	Riva Racing	2
9	JM Motorsport	0

=== Manufacturers ===
Pos	Manufacturer	Points
1	Renault	486
2	Peugeot	391
3	Toyota	390.5
4	Chevrolet	396
5	Fiat	326.5
6	Ford	2
