= 2010 TC 2000 Championship =

Seasons
- ← 2009 2011 →

The 2010 TC 2000 Championship was the 32nd Turismo Competicion 2000 season. It began on 21 March and ended on 5 December after 12 races. Norberto Fontana won the championship for Ford-YPF.

== Teams and drivers ==
- For the Buenos Aires 200 km, each entry implemented two drivers per car.

Team	Make	Car	#	Driver	Rounds
Equipo Petrobras	Honda	Honda Civic	1	(Argentina) José María López	All
Equipo Petrobras	Honda	Honda Civic	1	(Italy) Gabriele Tarquini	11
Equipo Petrobras	Honda	Honda Civic	2	(Argentina) Mariano Altuna	All
Equipo Petrobras	Honda	Honda Civic	2	(Argentina) Jorge Trebbiani	11
Equipo Petrobras	Honda	Honda Civic	3	(Argentina) Leonel Pernía	All
Equipo Petrobras	Honda	Honda Civic	3	(Argentina) Ricardo Risatti	11
Equipo Petrobras	Honda	Honda Civic	4	(Argentina) Néstor Girolami	All
Equipo Petrobras	Honda	Honda Civic	4	(Argentina) Matías Russo	11
Equipo Petrobras	Honda	Honda Civic	37	(Argentina) Santiago Ventana	All
Equipo Petrobras	Honda	Honda Civic	37	(Argentina) Germán Suárez	11
Renault LoJack Team	Renault	Renault Mégane	5	(Argentina) Juan Manuel Silva	All
Renault LoJack Team	Renault	Renault Mégane	5	(Brazil) Felipe Maluhy	11
Renault LoJack Team	Renault	Renault Mégane	6	(Argentina) Matías Rossi	All
Renault LoJack Team	Renault	Renault Mégane	6	(Argentina) Guido Falaschi	11
Ford-YPF	Ford	Ford Focus	7	(Argentina) Norberto Fontana	All
Ford-YPF	Ford	Ford Focus	7	(Brazil) Ricardo Maurício	11
Ford-YPF	Ford	Ford Focus	8	(Argentina) Gabriel Ponce de León	All
Ford-YPF	Ford	Ford Focus	8	(Brazil) Daniel Serra	11
Ford-YPF	Ford	Ford Focus	35	(Argentina) Martín Basso	All
Ford-YPF	Ford	Ford Focus	35	(Argentina) Lionel Ugalde	11
Toyota Team Argentina	Toyota	Toyota Corolla	9	(Argentina) Mariano Werner	All
Toyota Team Argentina	Toyota	Toyota Corolla	9	(Argentina) Esteban Guerrieri	11
Toyota Team Argentina	Toyota	Toyota Corolla	10	(Argentina) Facundo Ardusso	All
Toyota Team Argentina	Toyota	Toyota Corolla	10	(Argentina) Agustín Canapino	11
Toyota Team Argentina	Toyota	Toyota Corolla	31	(Argentina) Francisco Troncoso	All
Toyota Team Argentina	Toyota	Toyota Corolla	31	(Argentina) Rafael Morgenstern	11
Toyota Team Argentina	Toyota	Toyota Corolla	32	(Argentina) Bernardo Llaver	All
Toyota Team Argentina	Toyota	Toyota Corolla	32	(Argentina) Mauro Giallombardo	11
Chevrolet Elaion	Chevrolet	Chevrolet Vectra	11	(Argentina) Guillermo Ortelli	All
Chevrolet Elaion	Chevrolet	Chevrolet Vectra	11	(Switzerland) Alain Menu	11
Chevrolet Elaion	Chevrolet	Chevrolet Vectra	12	(Argentina) Christian Ledesma	All
Chevrolet Elaion	Chevrolet	Chevrolet Vectra	12	(France) Yvan Muller	11
Scudería Fiat	Fiat	Fiat Linea	13	(Argentina) Emanuel Moriatis	All
Scudería Fiat	Fiat	Fiat Linea	13	(Argentina) Diego Aventín	11
Scudería Fiat	Fiat	Fiat Linea	14	(Argentina) Emiliano Spataro	All
Scudería Fiat	Fiat	Fiat Linea	14	(Argentina) Ezequiel Baldinelli	11
Scudería Fiat	Fiat	Fiat Linea	39	(Argentina) Ezequiel Bosio	All
Scudería Fiat	Fiat	Fiat Linea	39	(Argentina) Marcelo Bugliotti	11
Scudería Fiat	Fiat	Fiat Linea	40	(Argentina) Leandro Carducci	All
Scudería Fiat	Fiat	Fiat Linea	40	(Sweden) Stefan Johansson	11
Scudería Fiat	Fiat	Fiat Linea	51	(Argentina) Ignacio Char	All
Scudería Fiat	Fiat	Fiat Linea	51	(Argentina) Juan Manuel López	11
Vittal DTA	Peugeot	Peugeot 307	15	(Argentina) Fabián Yannantuoni	All
Vittal DTA	Peugeot	Peugeot 307	15	(Argentina) José Yannantuoni	11
Vittal DTA	Peugeot	Peugeot 307	16	(Argentina) Matías Muñoz Marchesi	All
Vittal DTA	Peugeot	Peugeot 307	16	(Argentina) Guillermo Albertengo	11
Vittal DTA	Peugeot	Peugeot 307	43	(Argentina) Franco Coscia	All
Vittal DTA	Peugeot	Peugeot 307	43	(Argentina) Lucas Benamo	11
Peugeot Team Cobra	Peugeot	Peugeot 307	17	(Argentina) Luis José di Palma	All
Peugeot Team Cobra	Peugeot	Peugeot 307	17	(Argentina) Franco Vivian	11
Peugeot Team Cobra	Peugeot	Peugeot 307	18	(Argentina) Juan Cruz Álvarez	All
Peugeot Team Cobra	Peugeot	Peugeot 307	18	(France) Nicolas Minassian	11
Fineschi Racing	Honda	Honda Civic	19	(Argentina) Damián Fineschi	3–7
Fineschi Racing	Honda	Honda Civic	20	(Argentina) Javier Manta	9–12
Fineschi Racing	Honda	Honda Civic	20	(Argentina) Gustavo Fontana	11
Escudería Río de La Plata	Honda	Honda Civic	23	(Argentina) Franco Berardi	1–3
Escudería Río de La Plata	Honda	Honda Civic	23	(Argentina) Daniel Collazo	4–9
Escudería Río de La Plata	Honda	Honda Civic	23	(Argentina) Fabricio Pezzini	11–12
Escudería Río de La Plata	Honda	Honda Civic	23	(Argentina) Hanna Abdallah	11
Escudería Río de La Plata	Honda	Honda Civic	24	(Uruguay) Juan Ignacio Cáceres	1
Escudería Río de La Plata	Honda	Honda Civic	24	(Argentina) Leonel Larrauri	2–12
Escudería Río de La Plata	Honda	Honda Civic	24	(Argentina) Oscar Larrauri	11
Lanus Motorsport	Honda	Honda Civic	25	(Argentina) Daniel Belli	1–6, 8–12
Lanus Motorsport	Honda	Honda Civic	25	(Argentina) Adrián Chiriano	11
JM Motorsport	Volkswagen	Volkswagen Bora	27	(Argentina) Rubén Salerno	All
JM Motorsport	Volkswagen	Volkswagen Bora	27	(Argentina) Gustavo Der Ohanessian	11
JM Motorsport	Volkswagen	Volkswagen Bora	28	(Argentina) Marcelo Julián	1–3
JM Motorsport	Volkswagen	Volkswagen Bora	28	(Argentina) Nicolás Usprung	4–5
JM Motorsport	Volkswagen	Volkswagen Bora	28	(Argentina) Jorge Cersósimo	6–7
JM Motorsport	Volkswagen	Volkswagen Bora	28	(Argentina) Gonzalo Fernández	8–12
JM Motorsport	Volkswagen	Volkswagen Bora	28	(Argentina) Alejandro Berganza	11
JM Motorsport	Volkswagen	Volkswagen Bora	45	(Argentina) Gastón Ricardo	11
JM Motorsport	Volkswagen	Volkswagen Bora	45	(Argentina) Jorge Cersósimo	11
Riva Racing	Honda	Honda Civic	47	(Argentina) Javier Manta	1
Riva Racing	Volkswagen	Volkswagen Polo	47	(Argentina) Néstor Riva	7, 10
Riva Racing	Volkswagen	Volkswagen Polo	47	(Argentina) Nicolás Usprung	8–9, 11
Riva Racing	Volkswagen	Volkswagen Polo	47	(Uruguay) Ignacio Moreira	11
Riva Racing	Volkswagen	Volkswagen Polo	47	(Argentina) Maximiliano Baumgartner	12
Riva Racing	Honda	Honda Civic	48	(Argentina) Néstor Riva	2–6

== Race calendar and results ==
- A calendar of twelve dates without venues was released by the series on December 4, 2009. The race calendar was unveiled in early March.

Round	Circuit, location	Date	Pole position	Qualifying race winning driver	Fastest lap	Race winning driver
1	Punta del Este Street Circuit, Uruguay	March 21	(Argentina) José María López	not held	(Argentina) José María López	(Argentina) José María López
2	(Argentina) Autódromo Jorge Ángel Pena, San Martín, Mendoza	April 11	(Argentina) Facundo Ardusso	(Argentina) Norberto Fontana	(Argentina) José María López	(Argentina) Norberto Fontana
3	(Argentina) Autódromo Parque Ciudad de General Roca, General Roca, Río Negro	May 2	(Argentina) José María López	(Argentina) Martín Basso	(Argentina) Juan Manuel Silva	(Argentina) Mariano Altuna
4	(Argentina) Autódromo Oscar Cabalén, Alta Gracia, Córdoba	May 30	(Argentina) Norberto Fontana	(Argentina) Gabriel Ponce de León	(Argentina) Gabriel Ponce de León	(Argentina) Gabriel Ponce de León
5	(Argentina) Autódromo Santiago Yaco Guarnieri, Resistencia, Chaco	June 27	(Argentina) Emiliano Spataro	(Argentina) Emiliano Spataro	(Argentina) Néstor Girolami	(Argentina) Néstor Girolami
6	(Argentina) Autódromo Termas de Río Hondo, Santiago del Estero	July 18	(Argentina) Gabriel Ponce de León	not held	(Argentina) Mariano Werner	(Argentina) Leonel Pernía
7	(Argentina) Autódromo Ciudad de La Rioja, La Rioja	August 22	(Argentina) Néstor Girolami	(Argentina) Christian Ledesma	(Argentina) Norberto Fontana	(Argentina) Christian Ledesma
8	(Argentina) Streets of Santa Fe, Santa Fe	September 11	(Argentina) Emiliano Spataro	not held	(Argentina) Emiliano Spataro	(Argentina) Emiliano Spataro
8	(Argentina) Streets of Santa Fe, Santa Fe	September 12	(Argentina) Emiliano Spataro	not held	(Argentina) José María López	(Argentina) Norberto Fontana
9	(Argentina) Autódromo Parque Provincia del Neuquén, Neuquén	October 3	(Argentina) Emiliano Spataro	not held	(Argentina) Emiliano Spataro	(Argentina) Emiliano Spataro
10	(Argentina) Autódromo Ciudad de Oberá, Oberá, Misiones	October 24	(Argentina) Leonel Pernía	(Argentina) Bernardo Llaver	(Argentina) Bernardo Llaver	(Argentina) Leonel Pernía
11	(Argentina) Autódromo Juan y Oscar Gálvez, Buenos Aires	November 7	(Argentina) Mariano Werner (Argentina) Esteban Guerrieri	not held	(Argentina) Mariano Werner (Argentina) Esteban Guerrieri	(Argentina) Bernardo Llaver (Argentina) Mauro Giallombardo
12	(Argentina) Potrero de los Funes Circuit, San Luis	December 5	(Argentina) Martín Basso	not held	(Argentina) Matías Rossi	(Argentina) Matías Rossi

== Championship standings ==
Pos	Driver	PDE (Uruguay)	SMM (Argentina)	GRN (Argentina)	OCA (Argentina)	SYG (Argentina)	TRH (Argentina)	LRJ (Argentina)	SFE (Argentina)		NEU (Argentina)	OBE (Argentina)	BUE (Argentina)	POT (Argentina)	Points
1	(Argentina) Norberto Fontana	19	1	6	**3**	9	5	Ret	3	1	3	3	6	4	122.5
2	(Argentina) Leonel Pernía	Ret	2	13	2	3	1	3	4	18	13	**1**	8	13	119
3	(Argentina) Mariano Werner	3	8	7	Ret	4	22	Ret	15	Ret	2	8	**3**	2	94
4	(Argentina) Emiliano Spataro	13	7	5	Ret	**5**	Ret	12	**1**	**Ret**	**1**	5	Ret	7	91
5	(Argentina) Mariano Altuna	5	15	1	4	Ret	2	7	8	4	Ret	4	Ret	8	88
6	(Argentina) José María López	**1**	5	**11**	Ret	6	3	Ret	DSQ	2	11	2	Ret	12	83
7	(Argentina) Matías Rossi	2	23	2	10	Ret	21	Ret	2	Ret	5	Ret	Ret	1	80
8	(Argentina) Néstor Girolami	Ret	3	8	Ret	1	Ret	**DSQ**	12	6	4	6	4	Ret	77
9	(Argentina) Christian Ledesma	6	6	Ret	6	11	17	1	6	Ret	Ret	7	5	6	70
10	(Argentina) Facundo Ardusso	4	**10**	Ret	7	8	Ret	5	9	Ret	15	Ret	2	5	64.5
11	(Argentina) Guillermo Ortelli	Ret	4	Ret	8	2	8	8	5	Ret	Ret	11	9	3	60
12	(Argentina) Gabriel Ponce de León	8	9	9	1	7	**6**	Ret	11	DNS	9	Ret	Ret	9	51
13	(Argentina) Martín Basso	9	12	3	Ret	25	7	2	23	19	14	9	Ret	**Ret**	45
14	(Argentina) Bernardo Llaver	14	13	10	Ret	18	11	18	17	11	12	Ret	1	DNS	39
15	(Argentina) Juan Manuel Silva	Ret	Ret	Ret	Ret	12	4	14	7	3	16	Ret	10	DNS	25
16	(Argentina) Santiago Ventana	7	14	14	5	19	9	10	DSQ	8	Ret	12	12	Ret	20
17	(Argentina) Emanuel Moriatis	Ret	11	22	Ret	10	Ret	6	DSQ	5	8	DNS	Ret	Ret	16
18	(Argentina) Francisco Troncoso	11	16	4	Ret	24	12	DSQ	25	Ret	17	Ret	7	Ret	14
19	(Argentina) Ezequiel Bosio	Ret	17	Ret	9	Ret	Ret	Ret	24	9	6	Ret	Ret	Ret	12.5
20	(Argentina) Luis José di Palma	18	25	Ret	17	20	Ret	4	Ret	16	10	Ret	Ret	Ret	11
21	(Argentina) Juan Cruz Álvarez	12	28	16	Ret	15	15	9	Ret	13	7	Ret	Ret	18	6
22	(Argentina) Fabián Yannantuoni	10	24	12	11	Ret	10	Ret	Ret	7	22	Ret	15	11	5.5
23	(Argentina) Leandro Carducci	16	19	15	12	16	13	13	16	10	26	14	Ret	10	3
24	(Argentina) Matías Muñoz Marchesi	Ret	Ret	21	14	14	16	11	13	17	27	10	Ret	Ret	3
25	(Argentina) Franco Coscia	15	20	Ret	18	Ret	14	Ret	10	Ret	18	13	Ret	17	1
26	(Argentina) Ignacio Char							15	Ret	Ret	19	Ret	11	Ret	0
27	(Argentina) Rubén Salerno	Ret	26	20	16	23	20	20	19	12	25	15	14	16	0
28	(Argentina) Leonel Larrauri		Ret	17	13	13	DSQ	17	18	Ret	20	Ret	16	14	0
29	(Argentina) Fabricio Pezzini												13	Ret	0
30	(Argentina) Daniel Belli	Ret	18	Ret	Ret	21	Ret		14	Ret	21	17	Ret	Ret	0
31	(Argentina) Daniel Collazo				Ret	Ret	18	Ret	21	14	23				0
32	(Argentina) Damián Fineschi			Ret	15	17	19	16							0
33	(Argentina) Gonzalo Fernández								22	15	24	16	18	Ret	0
34	(Argentina) Javier Manta	Ret									Ret	18	17	15	0
35	(Argentina) Franco Berardi	17	22	19											0
36	(Argentina) Néstor Riva		21	18	Ret	22	Ret	19				22			0
37	(Argentina) Nicolás Usprung				19	26			20	Ret	Ret		Ret		0
38	(Argentina) Marcelo Julián	20	27	Ret											0
	(Argentina) Jorge Cersósimo						Ret	Ret					Ret		0
	(Uruguay) Juan Ignacio Cáceres	Ret													0
	(Argentina) Maximiliano Baumgartner													Ret	0
Pos	Driver	PDE (Uruguay)	SMM (Argentina)	GRN (Argentina)	OCA (Argentina)	SYG (Argentina)	TRH (Argentina)	LRJ (Argentina)	SFE (Argentina)		NEU (Argentina)	OBE (Argentina)	BUE (Argentina)	POT (Argentina)	Points

Colour	Result
Gold	Winner
Silver	Second place
Bronze	Third place
Green	Points classification
Blue	Non-points classification
Blue	Non-classified finish (NC)
Purple	Retired, not classified (Ret)
Red	Did not qualify (DNQ)
Red	Did not pre-qualify (DNPQ)
Black	Disqualified (DSQ)
White	Did not start (DNS)
White	Withdrew (WD)
White	Race cancelled (C)
Blank	Did not practice (DNP)
Blank	Did not arrive (DNA)
Blank	Excluded (EX)

**Bold** - Pole
Italics - Fastest lap
