= Canapino =

Canapino is a surname. Notable people with the surname include:

- Agustín Canapino (born 1990), Argentine racing driver, son of Alberto
- Alberto Canapino (1963–2021), Argentine racing car engineer
