= Agustín Canapino =

Argentine racing driver (born 1990)

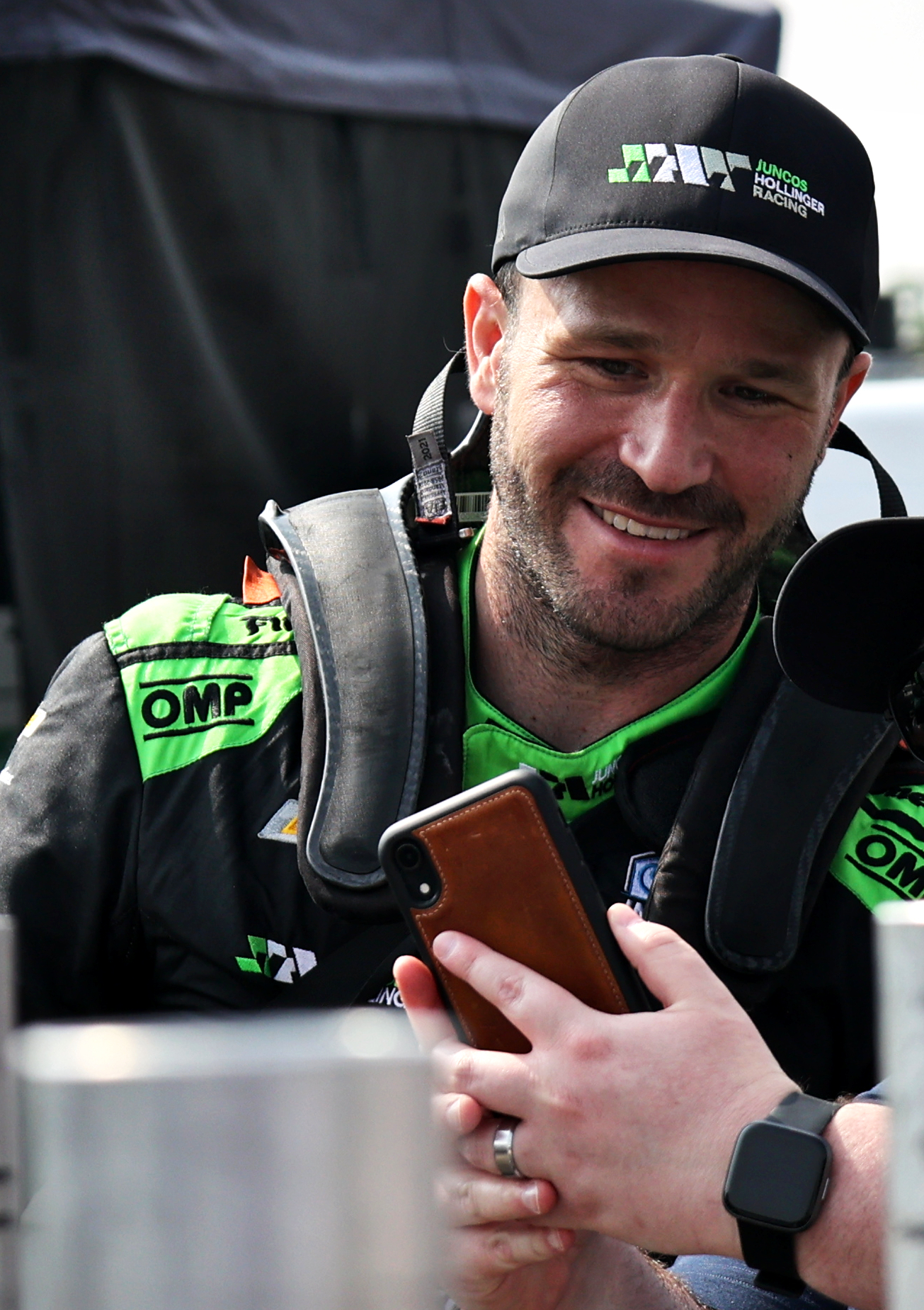
- Canapino in 2023
- Nationality: Argentine
- Born: Agustín Hugo Canapino; 19 January 1990 (age 36) Arrecifes, Argentina
- Categorisation: FIA Gold

IndyCar Series career
- 28 races run over 2 years
- Team: No. 78 (Juncos Hollinger Racing)
- Best finish: 21st (2023)
- First race: 2023 Grand Prix of St. Petersburg (St. Petersburg)
- Last race: 2024 Honda Indy Toronto (Exhibition Place)
Wins	Podiums	Poles
0	0	0

Championship titles
- 2007 2008 2010, 2011, 2012, 2013, 2014, 2016, 2017 2010, 2017, 2018, 2019, 2025 2016, 2021: Renault Megane Cup Argentina; TC Pista Argentina; Top Race V6 Turismo Carretera Súper TC2000

Agustín Hugo Canapino (Spanish pronunciation: [a.ɣusˈtin ˈu.ɣo ka.naˈpi.no]; born 19 January 1990) is an Argentine racing driver who currently competes in Turismo Carretera for Canning Motorsports.

Canapino is regarded as one of the most accomplished drivers in Argentine motorsport, having won five championships in Turismo Carretera, seven in Top Race V6, and two in TC2000. Outside of Argentina, Canapino competed for Juncos Hollinger Racing in the IndyCar Series in 2023 and 2024.

== Career overview ==
=== Touring cars ===
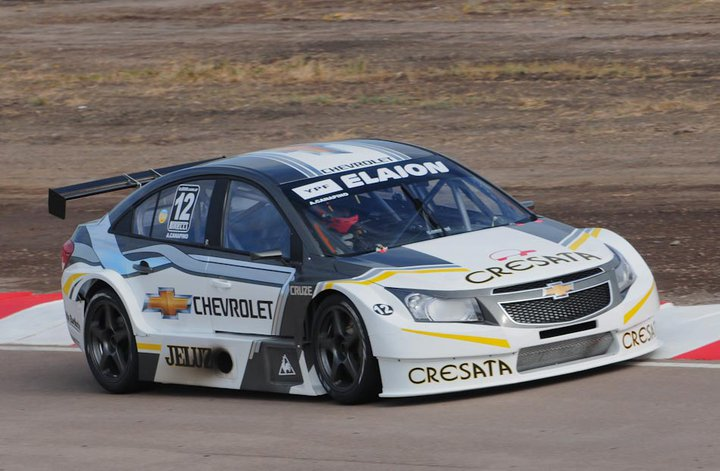
Canapino took his first TC 2000 win in the 2011 season.

With no previous racing experience, Canapino made his debut in 2005 in the Renault Mégane one-make touring car series. He won races in 2006 and won the championship in 2007. He made his debut that year in TC 2000 and the following year in Top Race and TC Pista, a championship prior to Turismo Carretera that he won that year.

Canapino won the TC and Top Race Torneo Clausura championships in 2010. Between 2011 and 2017 he won all the titles in Top Race (with a Mercedes-Benz prototype), except for 2015, which was won by Matías Rodríguez. Won the Súper TC 2000 championship in 2016 and 2021 with Chevrolet Argentina factory team and was a three-time TC champion between 2017 and 2019 with the Canapino Sport team (led by his father). He has also run a few races at Stock Car Brasil.

In 2019, Canapino was called by Ricardo Juncos, director of Juncos Racing, to race the 24 Hours of Daytona in DPi. Along with Will Owen, René Binder and Kyle Kaiser, he finished eighth in the class. He also raced at Sebring.

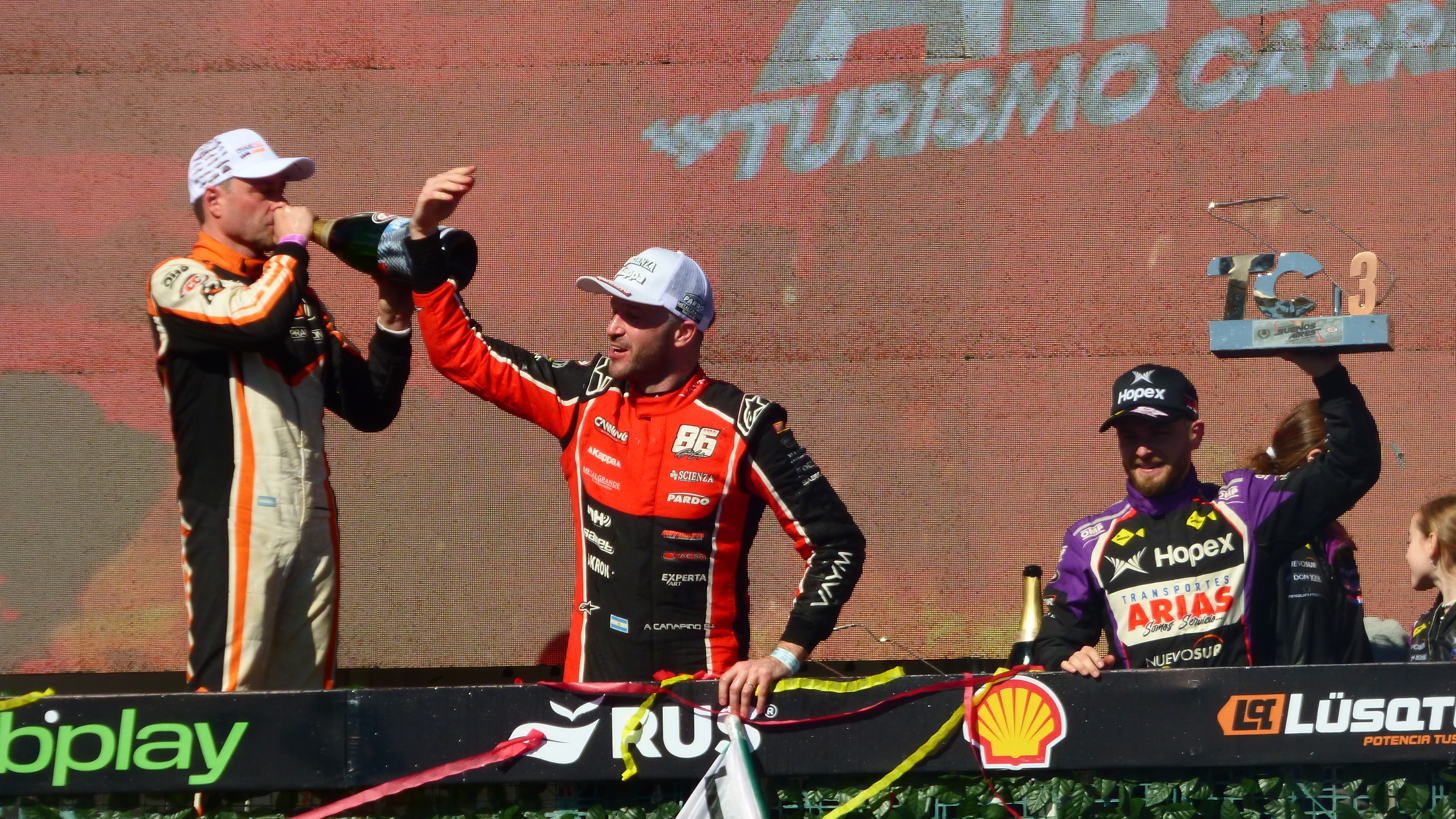
Canapino (centre) celebrates victory in the 2025 Turismo Carretera Buenos Aires round.

Canapino was awarded the Olimpia de Oro 2018 for the best Argentine sportsman of the year. He is together with Juan Manuel Fangio, the only racing driver to win this award. He received the Olimpia de Plata of the discipline four times.

=== IndyCar Series ===
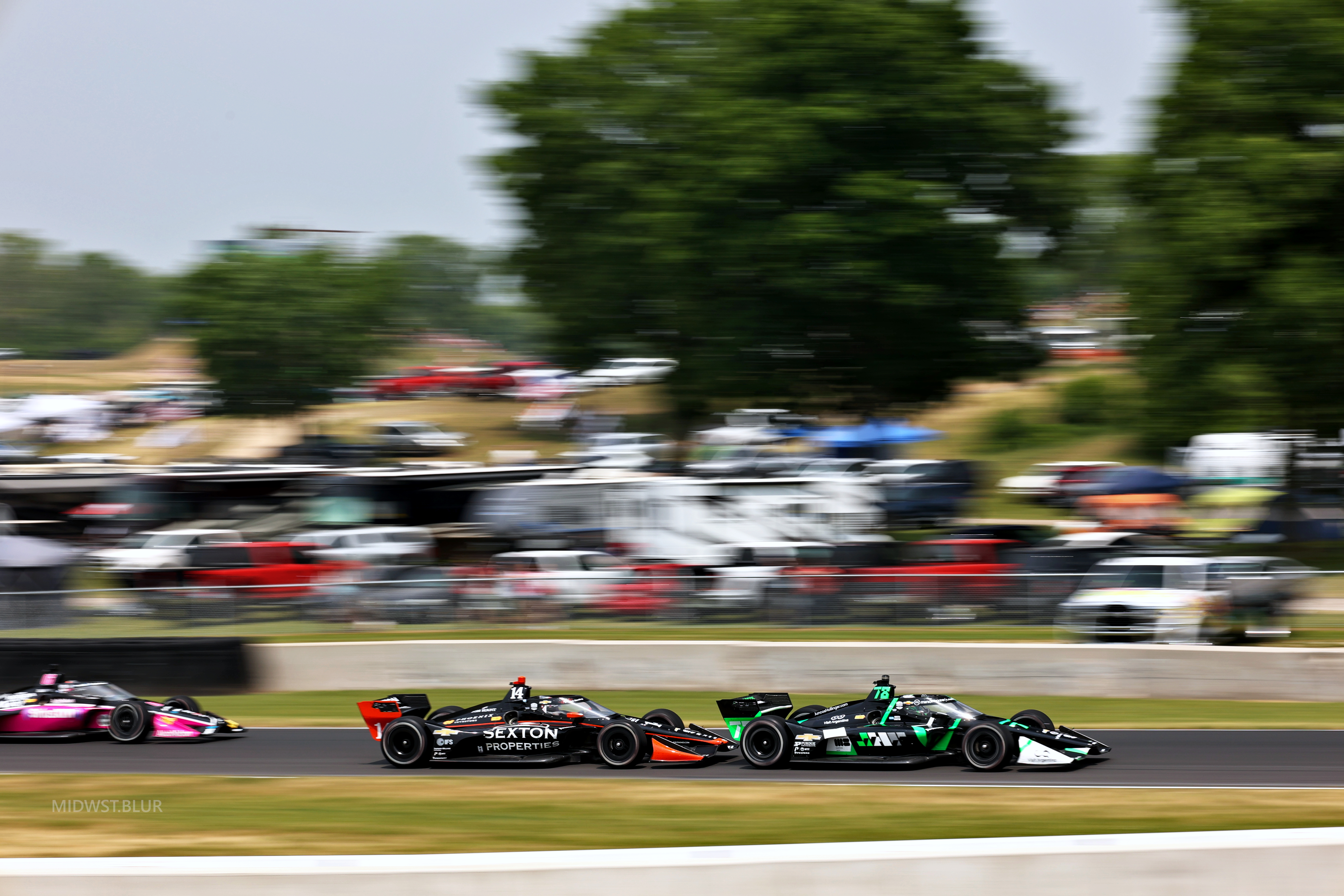
Canapino (right) competing at Road America in 2023

In October 2022, his former team Juncos Racing announced that Canapino would take part in two demonstration runs to be held in Argentina, where Canapino would drive one of the team's Dallara IR18 IndyCars from the 2022 series, to be held in November 2022. In preparation for these demonstration runs, the team entered Canapino in a private IndyCar driver evaluation test at Sebring. Following this, Canapino was confirmed as the team's second driver for the full 2023 championship, partnering Callum Ilott.

Canapino qualified in 21st place for his IndyCar debut at St. Petersburg, and drove through an incident-packed race to cross the line in twelfth place. He was the last classified car to cross the line on the lead lap. After participating in a mandatory oval rookie test at Texas Motor Speedway, Canapino returned to the track for the second round of the season. He started the race in 19th place and once again finished 12th.

Canapino left the team following the 2024 Honda Indy Toronto, with a statement published by Juncos on 7 August 2024.

==== Incidents of death threats from fans ====
At the 2023 Acura Grand Prix of Long Beach, Canapino was forced to retire from the race after hitting the turn 5 wall while trying to lap JHR teammate Callum Ilott, following a restart where Ilott had chosen to not pit in order to unlap himself. Following the race, fans of Canapino sent abusive messages including death threats towards Ilott on social media, leading to IndyCar releasing a statement condemning the abuse, with JHR waiting until the following Tuesday to release their own statement.

Following the 2023 Firestone Grand Prix of Monterey, Ilott was again the victim of abuse from Canapino fans after the two drivers had a collision on-track. JHR would release a statement, described by Marshall Pruett of RACER.com as a "tepid plea for civility" and "seemingly disinterested." In an interview with RACER, JHR co-owner Ricardo Juncos would blame Ilott for not ignoring the threats, leading to Ilott departing the team.

Following the 2024 Chevrolet Detroit Grand Prix, Canapino's fans would target Théo Pourchaire with death threats following another on-track incident. This third such incident lead to condemnations from Pourchaire's Arrow McLaren team, JHR's senior alliance partner. Canapino would release a statement on social media in response, denying that any death threats happened, and "liked" posts on social media mocking Pourchaire. Arrow McLaren would terminate their technical partnership with Juncos Hollinger Racing on 6 June 2024 effective immediately, citing the social media incidents as the reason; Canapino would later take a "leave of absence" from the team with the ensuing social media fallout and furor, being replaced by Nolan Siegel for the XPEL Grand Prix of Road America; Canapino would return to the team the race after and compete in five more races before leaving the team.

== Personal life ==
Canapino's father, Alberto Canapino, died on 15 February 2021, from COVID-19. Alberto was a race car mechanic and preparer. Canapino has a younger brother, Matías, who, as of 2023, races in TC Pista.

== Racing record ==
=== Racing career summary ===
Season	Series	Team	Races	Wins	Poles	F/Laps	Podiums	Points	Position
2005	Copa Mégane Argentina	Pfening Competición	?	?	?	?	?	?	?
2006	Copa Mégane Argentina	Pfening Competición	14	3	2	2	4	108	**3rd**
2007	Copa Mégane Argentina	Pfening Competición	12	6	3	3	9	190	**1st**
2007	TC 2000 Championship	DTA Power Tools	1	0	0	0	0	0	NC‡
2008	TC Pista	HAZ Racing Team	16	2	3	1	6	203.5	**1st**
2008	TC 2000 Championship	DTA Power Tools	14	0	0	0	0	10	17th
2008	Top Race V6	Diablos Rojos Motorsport	7	2	1	1	3	112	11th
2008	Top Race V6	Sportteam	3	0	0	0	1	112	11th
2009	Turismo Carretera	Dole Racing	16	0	0	0	2	138	11th
2009	TC 2000 Championship	Equipo Petrobras	3	0	0	0	1	0	NC‡
2009	Top Race V6	Sportteam	13	0	0	0	1	23	9th
2010	Turismo Carretera	3M JP Racing	11	0	0	0	2	315.5	**1st**
2010	Turismo Carretera	3M Canapino Sports	5	1	0	0	2	315.5	**1st**
2010	TC 2000 Championship	Toyota Team Argentina	1	0	0	0	1	0	NC‡
2010	Top Race V6 Copa América	Sportteam	6	0	1	1	2	95	**3rd**
2010	Top Race V6 Torneo Clausura	Sportteam	6	5	6	?	5	138	**1st**
2011	Turismo Carretera	3M Racing	11	1	0	0	1	96.5	24th
2011	TC 2000 Championship	Equipo Oficial Chevrolet	2	0	0	0	0	151	4th
2011	TC 2000 Championship	Equipo Oficial Chevrolet	8	2	3	1	4	151	4th
2011	Top Race V6	Sportteam	13	4	6	2	6	90	**1st**
2011	Formula 3 Sudamericana	Hitech Racing Brazil	2	0	0	0	0	10	11th
2012	Turismo Carretera	Canapino Sport	7	0	0	1	2	137.75	8th
2012	Turismo Carretera	JL Kun 16 Carrera	8	0	1	1	2	137.75	8th
2012	Súper TC2000	Equipo Chevrolet YPF	13	0	0	0	0	82.5	12th
2012	Top Race V6	Sportteam	12	4	4	2	9	70	**1st**
2013	Turismo Carretera	JL Kun 16 Carrera	5	1	0	1	1	235.25	24th
2013	Turismo Carretera	SpeedAgro Racing	11	0	0	0	0	235.25	24th
2013	Súper TC2000	Equipo Chevrolet YPF	12	3	5	1	4	149	4th
2013	Top Race V6	Sportteam	12	3	1	1	6	78	**1st**
2014	Turismo Carretera	Jet Racing	16	1	0	0	2	311	16th
2014	Súper TC2000	Peugeot Lo Jack Team	13	2	2	0	4	159	5th
2014	Top Race V6	Sportteam	12	6	9	2	9	288	**1st**
2014	Top Race Series	Sportteam	1	1	0	0	1	0	NC‡
2015	Turismo Carretera	Jet Racing	16	1	1	1	5	460.50	5th
2015	Top Race V6	Midas Racing Team	18	7	6	4	12	302	**2nd**
2015	Súper TC2000	Team Peugeot Total Argentina	13	1	3	1	6	167	**3rd**
2015	Top Race NOA	SDE Competición	1	0	0	0	0	0	NC‡
2016	Turismo Carretera	Jet Racing	16	1	0	0	1	544.75	6th
2016	Top Race V6	MS Sportteam	17	4	6	3	7	185	**1st**
2016	Súper TC2000	Chevrolet YPF	8	2	1	1	4	248	**1st**
2016	Súper TC2000	Chevrolet YPF	6	2	2	2	4	248	**1st**
2017	Turismo Carretera	Jet Racing	15	1	0	1	7	682.75	**1st**
2017	Top Race V6	MS Sportteam	15	5	6	3	9	202	**1st**
2017	Súper TC2000	Chevrolet YPF	13	3	2	0	7	191	**2nd**
2018	Turismo Carretera	SpeedAgro Racing	15	1	0	0	6	710	**1st**
2018	Top Race V6	MS Sportteam	12	1	5	2	7	168	**2nd**
2018	Súper TC2000	Chevrolet YPF	19	2	6	5	10	230	**2nd**
2018	Stock Car Brasil	Cimed Chevrolet Team	1	0	0	0	0	5	32nd
2019	Turismo Carretera	Canapino Sport	15	2	1	1	4	634.75	**1st**
2019	Súper TC2000	Chevrolet YPF	12	3	2	3	3	111	5th
2019	Top Race V6	MS Sportteam	16	2	2	2	8	246	**3rd**
2019	IMSA SportsCar Championship - DPi	Juncos Racing	2	0	0	0	0	44	25th
2019	Stock Car Brasil	YPF Elaion	1	0	0	0	0	10	30th
2020	Turismo Carretera	Canapino Sport	11	1	2	2	4	301	9th
2020	Súper TC2000	Chevrolet YPF	19	3	1	2	9	150	**2nd**
2021	Turismo Carretera	Squadra Canapino	15	1	1	0	5	461.50	**3rd**
2021	Súper TC2000	Chevrolet YPF	22	4	3	7	12	221	**1st**
2022	Turismo Carretera	JP Carrera	15	3	5	6	6	451.25	**3rd**
2022	TC2000 Championship	Chevrolet YPF	20	3	4	7	9	243	**3rd**
2022	Turismo Nacional - Clase 3	MM Team	1	0	0	0	1	0	NC‡
2023	IndyCar Series	Juncos Hollinger Racing	17	0	0	0	0	180	21st
2023	Turismo Carretera	JP Carrera/JHR	12	1	0	0	5	172.75	32nd
2024	IndyCar Series	Juncos Hollinger Racing	12	0	0	0	0	109	27th
2024	Turismo Carretera	Canning Motorsports	6	0	0	0	3	171	32nd
2025	Turismo Carretera	Canning Motorsports	15	6	7	2	7	702	**1st**
2025	TC Pick Up	Canning Motorsports	10	3	1	1	5	555	**1st**
2025	Turismo Carretera 2000	Axion Energy Sport	23	4	4	0	10	775	**1st**
2025	Turismo Nacional - Class 3	Ale Bucci Racing	3	1	1	1	1	82	22nd
2026	Turismo Carretera	Canning Motorsports							
2026	Turismo Nacional - Class 3	Canning Motorsports							

* Season still in progress.

=== Turismo Carretera results ===
(key) (Races in bold indicate pole position) (Races in italics indicate fastest lap) (Numbers in ^{superscript} indicate heat race results)

Year	Team	Car	1	2	3	4	5	6	7	8	9	10	11	12	13	14	15	16	Pos.	Pts
2009	Dole Racing	Chevrolet Coupé SS	MDA; 3^{?}	BAL; 4^{?}	BUA1; 31^{?}	RCU; 26^{?}	TRH1; 19^{?}	RAF; 15^{?}	POS ?^{?}	PDF ?^{?}	9DJ ?^{?}	TRH2 ?^{?}	BUA2 ?^{?}	PAR ?^{?}	SLU ?^{?}	OLA ?^{?}	LPL ?^{?}	BUA3 ?^{?}	11th	138
2010	JP Carrera Canapino Sports	Chevrolet Coupé SS	MDA ?^{?}	BAL ?^{?}	BUA1; 9^{8}	NEU; 25^{12}	TRH; 18^{11}	RAF; 6^{4}	POS; 5^{2}	BUA2; 9^{2}	RCU; 2^{1}	SLT; 2^{2}	9DJ; 37^{3}	TLW; 4^{3}	OLA; 4^{2}	PAR; 4^{1}	LPL; 3^{2}	BUA3; 1^{1}	1st	315.5
2011	Canapino Sports	Chevrolet Coupé SS	MDA; 1^{1}	TLW; 34^{15}	SLU; 7^{3}	NEU	TRH; DSQ^{18}	BUA1; DSQ^{14}	POS; 6^{1}	RAF; 35^{7}	RCU; 27^{7}	JUN; 8^{4}	PAR; EXC^{DSQ}	OLA; 20^{11}	RGA; 9^{3}	LPL; 39^{4}	BAL	BUA2; 34^{7}	24th	96.5
2012	Canapino Sports Jet Racing	Chevrolet Coupé SS	MDA; 3^{1}	PAR1; 43^{11}	MDZ; 39^{8}	TLW; 37^{6}	TRH; 21^{13}	RCU; DNS^{DNS}	POS; 2^{1}	RAF; 13^{5}	OLA; 31^{DNS}	BUA1; 6^{4}	PAR2; 15^{7}	JUN; 11^{3}	SLU; 2^{1}	BUA2; 3^{2}	TOA; 36^{1}	LPL; 40^{6}	8th	137.75
2013	Jet Racing Canapino Sports	Chevrolet Coupé SS	MDA; 1^{1}	NEU; DNS^{11}	JUN; 8^{3}	MDZ; 18^{8}	OLA1; 13^{4}	TRH; 41^{11}	POS; DNS^{10}	RAF; 35^{8}	BUA1; 7^{6}	OLA2; 28^{5}	PAR; 6^{4}	SLU; 37^{DNS}	CMR; 39^{7}	TOA; 38^{2}	TLW; 40^{9}	BUA2; 37^{4}	24th	235.25
2014	Jet Racing	Chevrolet Coupé SS	NEU; 34^{4}	PAR; 42^{8}	JUN; 1^{1}	CCD; DSQ^{7}	TOA1; 38^{13}	CDU; 2^{1}	TRH; 11^{8}	POS; 21^{11}	AGC; 29^{2}	OLA; 2^{4}	RAF; 8^{5}	SLU; 35^{4}	LPL; 7^{3}	TOA2; 21^{5}	TLW; 5^{3}	BUA; 36^{1}	16th	311
2015	Jet Racing	Chevrolet Coupé SS	CCD; 29^{7}	TOA1; 9^{1}	NEU; 3^{1}	VIE; 2^{2}	CDU; 14^{7}	POS; 12^{5}	TRH1; 1^{1}	TRH2; 2^{1}	PAR; 10^{6}	OLA; 39	RAF; 22^{3}	SLU; 5^{1}	RGA; 31^{DNS}	TOA2; 4^{4}	CMR; 3^{2}	LPL; 8^{3}	5th	460.50
2016	Jet Racing	Chevrolet Coupé SS	VIE; 13^{9}	NEU; 1^{1}	TOA1; 14^{2}	CCD; 7^{2}	OLA; 34	TRH1; 8^{3}	TRH2; 6^{2}	POS; 13^{7}	CDU1; 4^{1}	RAF; 28^{2}	PAR; 21^{?}	SLU; 11^{5}	CDU2; 9^{5}	TOA2; 6^{2}	TLW; 4^{2}	LPL; 23^{4}	6th	530.25
2017	Jet Racing	Chevrolet Coupé SS	VIE; 2^{2}	NEU; 22^{11}	OLA; 39^{10}	CDU; 6^{3}	VMC1; 1^{1}	POS; 14^{7}	PAR; 3^{1}	BUA; 40	TRH; 8	CCD; 2^{1}	VMC2; 2^{1}	RAF; 4^{4}	TOA; 3^{1}	CMR; 2^{3}	LPL; 4^{4}		1st	682.75
2018	Canapino Sports	Chevrolet Coupé SS	VIE; 22^{9}	NEU; 4^{3}	SLU; 17^{4}	CDU; 39^{13}	POS; 29^{2}	CCD; 3^{2}	TRH; 6	RAF; 2^{1}	BUA; 1	PAR; 7^{5}	VMC; 3^{1}	TOA; 3^{1}	OLA; 5^{2}	SJV; 2^{6}	SNI; 2^{11}		1st	710
2019	Canapino Sports	Chevrolet Coupé SS	VIE; 15^{12}	NEU1; 16^{10}	CDU; 33^{8}	SLU; 13^{5}	ROS; 7^{4}	RAF1; 2^{1}	TRH; 38^{4}	POS; 36^{2}	CCD; 4^{3}	SJV; 3	RAF2; 1^{1}	PAR; 13^{4}	SNI; 1^{1}	TOA; 2^{1}	NEU2; 4^{4}		1st	634.75
2020	Canapino Sports	Chevrolet Coupé SS	VIE; 36^{3}	NEU; 3^{2}	SNI1; 4^{3}	SNI2; 2^{1}	BUA1; 38^{1}	SNI3; 3^{1}	LPL1; 8^{3}	LPL2; 39^{4}	BUA2; 27^{2}	SJV1; 33^{1}	SJV2; 1^{1}						9th	301
2021	Canapino Sports	Chevrolet Coupé SS	LPL; 1^{1}	BUA; 4^{1}	SNI1; 2^{1}	CDU; 3^{2}	PAR; 22^{1}	SNI2; 7^{4}	CCD; 15^{12}	SJV1; 5	SJV2; 3^{2}	POS; 37^{9}	RAF; 37^{2}	SLU; 2^{2}	VIE; 5^{2}	TOA; 35^{2}	SJV3; 7^{3}		3rd	444.5
2022	JP Carrera	Chevrolet Coupé SS	VIE; 28^{1}	NEU; **3**^{1}	CDU; 1^{1}	TOA1; 1^{1}	TRH; 4^{2}	RAF; **1**^{1}	CCD; 3^{2}	POS; 16^{10}	SJV1; 25	PAR; 11^{4}	SLU; 20^{8}	CMR; 2^{1}	SNI; 19^{3}	TOA2; 39^{8}	SJV2; 7^{4}		3rd	451.25
2023	JP Carrera/JHR	Chevrolet Coupé SS	VIE	NEU	TOA1	ELC	CDU	TRH	RAF1	POS	SJV1	BUA; 12^{DNS}	SLU; 13^{7}	SNI; 45^{16}	RAF2; 3^{3}	TOA2; 12^{1}	SJV2; 3^{2}		32nd	172.75
2024	Canning Motorsports	Chevrolet Coupé SS Chevrolet Camaro Mk.6	ELC	VIE	NEU	TOA1	TRH	CDU	RAF	POS	SJV	BUA; 3^{2}	SLU; 39^{DNS}	PAR; 8^{2}	SNI; 2^{2}	TOA2; 2^{2}	LPL; **32**^{1}		32nd	171
2025	Canning Motorsports	Chevrolet Camaro Mk.6	VIE; **2**^{1}	ELC; 26^{4}	NEU; **C**^{1}	TOA1; 40	TRH; 36^{2}	AGC; 5^{2}	POS; 2^{1}	CDU; **1**^{1}	SJV; 21	BUA; **1**^{1}	SLU; 1^{1}	SNI; 1^{1}	PAR; 1^{1}	TOA2; 5^{3}	LPL; 1^{1}		1st	702
2026	Canning Motorsports	Chevrolet Camaro Mk.6	ELC; 42^{10}	VIE; 51^{19}	NEU; 1^{2}	CDU; 5^{2}	TRH; 18^{7}	AGC; 7^{3}	RAF; 2^{1}	POS; 17^{7}	SJV; 12	PAR; 8^{2}	SLU	SNI	ROS	RCU	LPL		2nd*	264*

*Season in progress.

=== TC 2000 Championship/Súper TC2000 results (incomplete) ===
(key) (Races in bold indicate pole position) (Races in italics indicate fastest lap)

Year	Team	Car	1	2	3	4	5	6	7	8	9	10	11	12	13	14	Pos.	Pts
2007	DTA	Chevrolet Astra II	CR	GR	BB	SMM	SJU	SÃO	COR	SFE	SRA	VIE	BA	OBE	SL; Ret	PDE	NC^{†}	0
2008	DTA Power Tools	Chevrolet Astra II	PAR; Ret	SAL; Ret	GR; 7	SFE; Ret	SJU; Ret	RES; 11	COR; 21	BA; Ret	OBE; 13	TRH; 12	VIE; Ret	SMM; Ret	PDF; 14	PDE; 8	17th	10
2009	Equipo Petrobras	Honda Civic VIII	COR	GR	OBE	SMM	TRH; 5	RES	BA; 8	CEN	SFE1	SFE2	SJU1	SJU2	PDF; 3		NC^{†}	0
2010	Toyota Team Argentina	Toyota Corolla X	PDE	SMM	GR	COR	RES	TRH	LRJ	SFE1	SFE2	CEN	OBE	BA; 2	PDF		NC^{†}	0
2011	Equipo Oficial Chevrolet	Chevrolet Vectra III	GR; 8	SFE1; WD	SFE2; WD												4th	151
2011	Equipo Oficial Chevrolet	Chevrolet Cruze				SMM; DNS	SJU; 12	RES; 12	**COR**; 1	TRH; 12	MOU; Ret	TRE; 1	**JUN**; 6	**PDF**; 3	PAR; 2		4th	151

^{†} As Canapino was a guest driver, he was ineligible to score championship points.

=== Complete Stock Car Brasil results ===
(key) (Races in bold indicate pole position) (Races in italics indicate fastest lap)

Year	Team	Car	1	2	3	4	5	6	7	8	9	10	11	12	13	14	15	16	17	18	19	20	21	Rank	Points
2018	Cimed Racing	Chevrolet Cruze	INT; 1	CUR; 1	CUR; 2	VEL; 1	VEL; 2	LON; 1	LON; 2	SCZ; 1	SCZ; 2	GOI; 1; 12	MOU; 1	MOU; 2	CAS; 1	CAS; 2	VCA; 1	VCA; 2	TAR; 1	TAR; 2	GOI; 1	GOI; 2	INT; 1	32nd	5
2019	YPF Elaion	Chevrolet Cruze	VEL; 1	VCA; 1	VCA; 2	GOI; 1	GOI; 2	LON; 1	LON; 2	SCZ; 1; 11	SCZ; 2 Ret	MOU; 1	MOU; 2	INT; 1	VEL; 1	VEL; 2	CAS; 1	CAS; 2	VCA; 1	VCA; 2	GOI; 1	GOI; 2	INT; 1	30th	10

=== Complete WeatherTech SportsCar Championship results ===
(key) (Races in bold indicate pole position; races in italics indicate fastest lap)

Year	Entrant	Class	Make	Engine	1	2	3	4	5	6	7	8	9	10	Rank	Points
2019	Juncos Racing	DPi	Cadillac DPi-V.R	Cadillac 5.5 L V8	DAY; 8	SEB; 10	LBH	MOH	DET	WGL	MOS	ELK	LGA	PET	25th	44

=== 24 Hours of Daytona results ===
Year	Team	Co-drivers	Car	Class	Laps	Pos.	Class pos.
2019	(United States) Juncos Racing	(United States) Will Owen (Austria) René Binder (United States) Kyle Kaiser	Cadillac DPi-V.R	DPi	555	29th	8th

=== American open–wheel racing results ===
==== IndyCar Series ====
(key)

Year	Team	No.	Chassis	Engine	1	2	3	4	5	6	7	8	9	10	11	12	13	14	15	16	17	18	Rank	Points	Ref
2023	Juncos Hollinger Racing	78	Dallara DW12	Chevrolet	STP; 12	TXS; 12	LBH; 25	ALA; 26	IMS; 21	INDY; 26	DET; 14	ROA; 19	MOH; 23	TOR; 12	IOW; 16	IOW; 26	NSH; 20	IMS; 21	GTW; 22	POR; 26	LAG; 14		21st	180	
2024	Juncos Hollinger Racing	78	Dallara DW12	Chevrolet	STP; 16	THE; 10	LBH; 15	ALA; 20	IMS; 21	INDY; 22	DET; 12	ROA	LAG; 18	MOH; 22	IOW; 26	IOW; 25	TOR; 26	GTW	POR	MIL	MIL	NSH	27th	109	

==== Indianapolis 500 ====
Year	Chassis	Engine	Start	Finish	Team
2023	Dallara	Chevrolet	26	26	Juncos Hollinger Racing
2024	Dallara	Chevrolet	22	22	Juncos Hollinger Racing

Sporting positions
Preceded by Emanuel Moriatis	Turismo Carretera champion 2010	Succeeded by Guillermo Ortelli
Preceded by Guido Falaschi	Top Race V6 champion 2010–2014	Succeeded by Matías Rodríguez
Preceded by Matías Rodríguez	Top Race V6 champion 2016-2017	Succeeded by Franco Girolami
Preceded by Guillermo Ortelli	Turismo Carretera champion 2017, 2018, 2019	Succeeded by Mariano Werner
Awards
Preceded by Delfina Pignatiello	Olimpia de Oro; 2018	Succeeded by Luis Scola
