= 2007 Buenos Aires 200km =

Autódromo Juan y Óscar Gálvez No 9

The 2007 200 km of Buenos Aires was the fourth edition of this race on the TC2000 season. The race was held in the Autódromo Juan y Óscar Gálvez in Buenos Aires.

== Report ==
The driver pairing formed by Juan Manuel Silva and Ezequiel Bosio (Honda Petrobras) won the fourth edition of the Buenos Aires 200 km, which took place on Sunday, October 7, 2007 in front of seventy-thousand spectators.

Silva/Bosio put an effective strategy to good use for a special event like this long-distance one, with included driver changes, and went on to claim victory followed by Carlos Bueno/Anthony Reid (Honda Lubrax) and Matías Rossi/Walter Hernández (Chevrolet Elaion).

In a race which included several key moments, the fight for the lead took place on the track and also in the pits. With great overtaking maneuvers and the driver changes which led to the eventual outcome. Also, this special event, which includes additional championship points, meant that Matías Rossi was able to extend his standings lead.

Right from the start, emotions ran high with slow start of Guillermo Ortelli, who was demoted to 5th by the two Ford Focus' of the works YPF-Ford team. Even so, everyone took care at the start, bearing in mind the length of the event. This led to there not being much overtaking during the first laps.

As the race progressed, the drivers who were doing the first stint (most of them being the cars' usual drivers in the series) began to push. This was the case of Gabriel Ponce de León, who overtook team-mate Martín Basso, while Christian Ledesma (Chevrolet Elaion) got past Emiliano Spataro (Renault TC2000 Team).

In the middle of the struggle, the Chevrolet drivers (Rossi and Ledesma) began duelling while reigning champion Rossi was trying to find a way past Basso, until the former's car went wide at a corner and at that moment Ledesma made his move and got alongside his team-mate. That's how they continued until reaching the Esses, with their cars practically making contact. Ledesma came out ahead.

Later, battling concentrated between Spataro and Ledesma on one hand, and Rossi and Basso on the other. That was until the safety car was deployed so that the car of Fabricio Benedetti could be removed to a safer place. The action began again on lap 25, only 4 prior to the beginning of the permitted driver changes.

Race leader Silva was the first to stop at the pits, and he was immediately followed by Rossi, Spataro and José María López. Meanwhile, Cacá Bueno came in on lap 31, and Ponce de León one lap later. After the driver changes, José Ciantini (who had taken over from Ponce de León) led the field, closely followed by Scotland's Anthony Reid, who had taken over from Bueno.

Behind Ponce/Ciantini and Bueno/Reid came Brazil's Hoover Orsi (YPF-Ford), local driver Walter hernández (Chevrolet Elaion) and Brazilians Felipe Maluhy (Renault TC2000 Team) and Ricardo Mauricio (TTA).

But more action was to come, and it was referred to the lead. Reid made contact with Ciantini while braking for the Hairpin and lost ground in the process. This allowed Bosio to grab 2nd place, allowing him to go in pursuit of Bocha Ciantini. Soon after, when the engine of the leading Focus called it a day, Bosio inherited the lead.

Bosio managed to keep Reid at bay, and motored on to his first TC2000 win. This result meant the first time in which the winners of the event also claimed pole.

The series' most important event fell into the hands of the Silva/Bosio pairing and the Honda Petrobras team. Rossi reaped the benefits as his co-driver, Hernández, climbed to 3rd place by the finish. This, together with the retirement of Ledesma, and Basso's 9th place finish propelled Rossi ahead of his championship pursuers.

The fourth edition of the Buenos Aires 200 km was won by a different driver pairing from previous editions. The event also featured a Formula One car completing laps of the circuit.

== Results ==
Position	Number	Driver	Car
1	3	(Argentina) Juan Manuel Silva (Argentina) Ezequiel Bosio	Honda Civic
2	57	(Brazil) Cacá Bueno (United Kingdom) Anthony Reid	Honda Civic
3	1	(Argentina) Matías Rossi (Argentina) Walter Hernández	Chevrolet Astra
4	8	(Argentina) Emiliano Spataro (Brazil) Felipe Maluhy	Renault Megane
5	25	(Argentina) Santiago Ventana (Argentina) Jorge Trebbiani	Chevrolet Astra
6	14	(Argentina) Esteban Tuero (Argentina) Roberto Urretavizcaya	Volkswagen Bora
7	4	(Argentina) Carlos Okulovich (Mexico) German Quiroga	Honda Civic
8	33	(Argentina) Néstor Girolami (Argentina) Mariano Gonzalez Cono	Honda Civic
9	6	(Argentina) Martín Basso (Brazil) Hoover Orsi	Ford Focus
10	37	(Argentina) José María López (Argentina) Lucas Benamo	Honda Civic
11	56	(Argentina) Nelson Garcia (Argentina) Mariano Werner	Ford Focus
12	31	(Argentina) Nicolas Kern (Argentina) Mariano Sortino	Ford Focus
13	24	(Argentina) Gabriel Adamoli (Argentina) Franco Novillo	Chevrolet Astra
14	40	(Argentina) Daniel Belli (Argentina) Cristian Dose	Honda Civic
15	20	(Uruguay) Juan Ignacio Caceres (Argentina) Claudio Kohler	Honda Civic
