= 2011 Formula Renault seasons =

2011 Formula Renault

Seasons
- ← 2010 2012 →

This article describes all the 2011 seasons of Formula Renault series across the world.

== Formula Renault 2.0L ==
=== 2011 Formula Renault 2.0 Italia season ===
- Point system: 32, 28, 24, 22, 20, 18, 16, 14, 12, 10, 8, 6, 4, 2, 1 for 15th. In each race 2 points for Fastest lap and 2 for Pole position in race 1.
- Races: 2 race by rounds length of 30 minutes each.

Pos	Driver	Team	(Italy) MNZ March 26–27		(Italy) IMO May 7–8		(Italy) MUG May 28–29		(Austria) RBR June 11–12		(Italy) MIS July 23–24		(Italy) ADR September 24–25		Points
Pos	Driver	Team	1	2	3	4	5	6	7	8	9	10	11	12	Points
1	(Italy) Andrea Boffo	Team Torino Motorsport	7	1	4	3	4	4	1	5	2	1	4	5	302
2	(Italy) Omar Mambretti	Team Torino Motorsport	2	11	2	2	5	1	4	7	5	2	3	4	276
3	(Italy) Christian Mancinelli	GSK Motorsport	1	Ret	6	1	1	17	5	2	1	13	1	2	266
4	(Italy) Tommaso Menchini	GSK Motorsport	6	4	3	4	3	3	2	4	Ret	Ret	2	7	228
5	(Italy) Nicola De Val	Viola Formula Racing	3	3	22	5	7	13	3	1	4	6	7	6	224
6	(Italy) Stefano De Val	Viola Formula Racing	4	12	5	7	Ret	9	8	6	6	Ret	5	1	184
7	(Italy) Simone Taloni	Winner Motorsport			8	10	6	2	9	Ret	9	5	8	9	140
8	(Italy) Alberto Agresta	MG Motorsport			7	9	2	Ret			Ret	7	6	3	114
9	(Mexico) Luis Michael Dörrbecker	Team Costa Rica / Facondini Racing	8	13	15	Ret	11	6	6	3	Ret	12	10	Ret	103
10	(Italy) Patrick Gobbo	Team Torino Motorsport	5	2	9	11	8	7							98
11	(Italy) Claudio Maria Castiglioni	CO2 Motorsport	Ret	7	Ret	13	9	5			7	8	9	14	96
12	(Italy) Emanuele Piva	Viola Formula Racing			13	6	10	10			10	4	15	10	85
13	(Italy) Matteo Ciccaglioni	SG Motors	9	14	1	15	Ret	8			Ret	16			61
14	(Italy) Luca Defendi	GSK Motorsport							7	8	14	11	Ret	8	54
15	(Italy) Andrea Baiguera	CO2 Motorsport	11	10	21	16	13	11			11	Ret	13	Ret	42
16	(Italy) Angelo Mezzatesta	Facondini Racing	12	8	11	Ret	12	12							40
17	(Venezuela) Valeria Vanessa Carballo Berroteran	Team Costa Rica / Facondini Racing	13	9	Ret	18	16	DNS	Ret	Ret	8	Ret	Ret	11	38
17	(Italy) Pierluigi Veronesi	CO2 Motorsport	Ret	5	14	12	Ret	15							31
19	(Italy) Luca Mingotti	AP Motorsport			10	8					15	14			29
20	(Costa Rica) James Adams	Team Costa Rica / Facondini Racing	10	6											28
21	(Italy) Stefano Turchetto	TS Corse									3	15			27
22	(Italy) Kevin Gilardoni	Team Torino Motorsport									Ret	3			24
23	(Italy) Pietro Peccenini	TS Corse									12	9			18
24	(Canada) David Richert	Team Torino Motorsport			16	20					13	10			14
25	(Italy) Matteo Pollini	CO2 Motorsport											11	12	14
26	(Italy) Gabriele Larini	Team Torino Motorsport					15	Ret					12	13	11
27	(Mexico) Juan Carlos Sistos	Team Costa Rica / Facondini Racing			12	14	17	16							8
28	(Italy) Laura Polidori	LP Motorsport					14	14							4
29	(Panama) Gianni Alessandria	Team Costa Rica / Facondini Racing											14	15	3
–	(France) Hervé Clement	GTRO			17	19									0
–	(Italy) Emanuele Mari	GSK Motorsport			Ret	17									0
–	(France) Michel Mora	GTRO			18	21									0
–	(France) Christian Ruiz	GTRO			19	23									0
–	(France) Gilles Charpentier	GTRO			20	22									0

Pos	Team	Points
1	(Italy) Team Torino Motorsport	590
2	(Italy) GSK Motorsport	464
3	(Italy) Viola Formula Racing	408
4	Team Costa Rica / Facondini Racing	195
5	(Italy) CO2 Motorsport	149
6	(Italy) Winner Motorsport	140
7	(Italy) MG Motorsport	114
8	(Italy) TS Corse	45
9	(Italy) AP Motorsport	29
10	(Italy) Facondini Racing	28

=== 2011 Asian Formula Renault Challenge season ===
- Point system: 30, 24, 20, 17, 15, 13, 11, 9, 7, 5, 4, 3, 2, 1 for 14th. No points for Fastest lap or Pole position. Drivers, that start their season at round 5 or later, don't receive any points for the final standing. The team point attribution is different from the driver point system: 10, 8, 6, 5, 4, 3, 2, 1.
- Races: 2 races by rounds.
- All races were held in China.

The Asian Challenge Category (A) reward the best Asian driver.

Pos	Driver	Team	Zhuhai 7–8 May		Zhuhai 28–29 May		Zhuhai 18–19 June		Shanghai 20–21 August		Shanghai 22–23 October		Zhuhai 10–11 December		Points	Points (A)
Pos	Driver	Team	1	2	3	4	5	6	7	8	9	10	11	12	Points	Points (A)
1	(Finland) Leopold Ringbom	PS Racing	1	5	5	4	1	Ret	1	1	1	1	2	2	275	N/E
2	(Japan) Yuki Shiraishi	PS Racing			1	1	2	1	3	2	Ret	2	1	1	242	264
3	(Indonesia) Alexandra Asmasoebrata	PS Racing	2	3	3	6	6	3	9	5	4	10	3	5	182	224
4	(Japan) Kazuhiro Saeki	Champ Motorsport							4	3	2	4	4	3	115	138
5	(Macau) Diana Rosario	Gold Wolf Racing Team			7	Ret	5	4	6	8	8	6	Ret	6	91	112
6	(Singapore) Timothy Teo	Champ Motorsport (1–2); Asia Racing Team (3–12)	3	Ret	6	9	Ret	2			Ret	7	Ret	8	84	102
7	(Hong Kong) Victor Yung	Champ Motorsport	5	4			7	6					6	7	80	96
8	(China) Li Chi Cong	Asia Racing Team	6	2	2	7									72	88
9	(United States) Juan Arenas	Gold Wolf Racing Team	4	1	Ret	5									62	N/E
10	(China) Patrice Bonzom	PS Racing							7	6	5	8	7	Ret	57	N/E
11	(Russia) Alexey Karachev	Champ Motorsport			Ret	2	3	Ret							44	N/E
12	(Hong Kong) Angelo Negro	Audax / PS Racing									3	5			35	39
13	(Hong Kong) Sunny Wong	Champ Motorsport									6	3			33	44
14	(Japan) Tsutomu Achiha	Champ Motorsport					4	5							32	39
15	(China) Leo Ye	FRD Racing Team							5	4					32	37
16	(Japan) Shigetomo Shimono	Champ Motorsport											5	4	32	37
17	(Japan) Kei Yamaura	Albirex Racing Team			8	3									29	35
18	(Hong Kong) Matthew Lock	Gold Wolf Racing Team			Ret	8	8	7							29	39
19	(Hong Kong) Thomas Chow	Asia Racing Team	DNS	8									8	9	25	35
20	(Macau) Lam Kam San	FRD Racing Team	7	6											24	32
21	(China) Martin Cao	FRD Racing Team							2	DSQ					24	30
22	(Hong Kong) Alan Lee	FRD Racing Team			Ret	10					7	9			23	43
23	(China) Wai Kai Un	Champ Motorsport							8	7					24	28
24	(China) Wu Ruo Peng	FRD Racing Team	8	7											20	28
25	(Hong Kong) Francis Tjia	OpenRoad Racing			4	DNS									17	17
26	(Hong Kong) Chacky Ip	Champ Motorsport			9	11									11	16
27	(Spain) Guille Pintanel	Champ Motorsport					DNS	8							5	N/E
28	(Australia) Brendon Cook	PS Racing							DNS	DNS					0	N/E

Pos	Team	Points	Points (A)
1	(Finland) PS Racing	110	80
2	(China) Champ Motorsport	85	99
3	(China) FRD Racing Team	55	71
4	(China) Asia Racing Team	36	45
5	(United States) Gold Wolf Racing Team	22	10
6	(Hong Kong) Audax / PS Racing	12	0
7	(Japan) Albirex Racing Team	9	10
8	(Hong Kong) OpenRoad Racing	6	6

== Formula Renault 1.6L ==
=== 2011 French F4 Championship season ===
Replace the F4 Eurocup 1.6.

== Other Formulas powered by Renault championships ==
=== 2011 GP2 Series seasons ===
The GP2 Series and GP2 Asia Series are powered by 4 litre Renault V8 engines and Pirelli tyres with a new Dallara chassis.

=== 2011 Austria Formel Renault Cup season ===
The season will be probably held on 14 rounds in 7 venues in Czech Republic, Germany, Belgium and Austria. The races occur with other categories cars: Austrian Formula 3, Formelfrei and Formula 3,5L like (Renault 3,5L from World Series, Lola Cosworth). This section present only the Austrian Formula Renault 2.0L classification.

- Point system: 20, 15, 12, 10, 8, 6, 4, 3, 2, 1 for 10th. No points for Fastest lap or Pole position.

Pos	Driver	Team	(Germany) Hockenheim April 2		(Austria) Red Bull Ring May 21–22		(Belgium) Spa June 11–12		(Germany) Hockenheim July 9–10		(Germany) Hockenheim July 22–23		(Czech Republic) Most August 6–7		(Germany) Hockenheim October 14–15		Points
Pos	Driver	Team	1	2	3	4	5	6	7	8	9	10	11	12	13	14	Points
1	(Switzerland) Thomas Amweg	Equipe Bernoise	2	3	2	2	2	2	1	2	1	3	2	3	2	2	211
2	(Switzerland) Thomas Aregger	Thomas Aregger	DNS	2	1	1	3	DNS	4	1	3	1	5	2	1	1	192
3	(Switzerland) Kurt Böhlen	Equipe Bernoise (1–2, 7–12); Böhlen Motorsport (3–4, 13–14)	3	1	3	3	1	1	3	3	2	4	3	1	Ret	Ret	177
4	(France) Steeve Gerard	SG Racing	6	4	4	4	4	3	9	6	4	2	6	7	Ret	DNS	101
5	(Switzerland) Manuel Amweg	Equipe Bernoise	4	Ret			7	5	Ret	4	5	5	4	8	3	3	85
6	(France) Gregory Striebig	Team One	5	6	5	5	6	6	6	Ret	DNS	6	8	9	4	Ret	69
7	(Germany) Kai Boller	Franz Wöss Racing (1–8); Kai Boller (11–12)	1	8					2	DNS			1	5			66
8	(France) Remy Striebig	Team One	7	5	7	8	8	8	7	7	7	8	7	10	8	7	52
9	(France) Remy Kirchdörffer	Team One	8	DNS	6	6	5	7	Ret	8	6	7	9	6	9	DNS	50
10	(Germany) Marlene Dietrich	Keese Motorsport (7–8); Marlene Dietrich (9–14)							5	5	Ret	13			5	4	34
11	(Germany) Stefan Scho	Stefan Scho	Ret	7			Ret	4	8	DNS					6	6	29
12	(France) Philippe Leclere	Philippe Leclere	9	9			9	9	10	9	10	11					12
13	(Czech Republic) David Palmi	Palmi Motorsport											10	4			11
14	(Estonia) Toomas Annus	Scuderia Nordica			8	DNS					9	10			10	9	9
15	(Germany) Hubertus Carlos Vier	Hubertus Carlos Vier													12	5	8
16	(France) Christophe Weber	Christophe Weber									8	9					5
17	(Estonia) Madis Kasemets	Scuderia Nordica													7	10	5
18	(Latvia) Agris Stanevics	Scuderia Nordica			Ret	7					11	12					4
19	(Germany) Frank Nowak	Frank Nowak													11	8	3
20	(Germany) Dr. Ruthard Boller	Franz Wöss Racing					10	10									2

=== 2011 Formula 2000 Light season ===
This is the fourth season of the Formula 2000 Light held in Italy. The series use Tatuus Formula Renault or Dallara Formula 3 chassis with 2000 cc maximum engines and Michelin tyres. Last year a Formula 2000 Top without Tatuus chassis and less powerful Formula 1600 Light (1.6L) classes was introduced and raced mixed up with the main F2000 class. Since this season it partly races together with the Formula 3000 Light.

- Point system: 32, 28, 24, 22, 20, 18, 16, 14, 12, 10, 8, 6, 4, 2, 1 for 15th. In each race 2 point for Fastest lap. 3 points for Pole position in first race.
- Races: 2 races by rounds.
- All races were held in Italy.

The F2000 championship reward several sub categories:

- Over 35: for drivers older than 35 years old (+).
- Under 17: for drivers younger than 17 years old (−).
- Formula 3: for drivers using Formula 3 chassis (F3).
- Team: for racing team involved in all venues.

The rounds a and b held in Imola, March 19–20 are the opening series and do not reward points.

Pos	Driver	Team	Imola 19–20 March		Franciacorta 9–10 April		Imola 30 April–1 May		Varano 21–22 May		Imola 1–2 July		Adria 3–4 September		Monza 1–2 October		Points
Pos	Driver	Team	a	b	1	2	3	4	5	6	7	8	9	10	11	12	Points
1	(Italy) Antonino Pellitteri (FA)	Tomcat Racing	4	13	2	4	1	1	1	8†	1	1	1	5	3	3	349
2	(Italy) Baldassare Curatolo (−) (L)	Durango (1–8); GSK Motorsport (9–12)			5	5	3	2	4	7	2	2	3	1	8	9	273
3	(Italy) Simone Gatto (+) (L)	TS Corse	Ret	8	4	6	2	3	2	4	3	3	7	3	4	14†	254
4	(Italy) Pietro Peccenini (+) (L)	TS Corse	9	12	10	9	4	5	3	2	4	5	5	4	6	5	238
5	(Italy) Francesco Mingione (L)	GSK Motorsport			13†	12	8	8	8	5	7	8	6	2	12	10	164
6	(Monaco) Alfredo Maisto (+) (L) (FA 9–12)	Di e Gi Motorsport			7	13†			7	3			2	7†	7	12†	126
7	(Japan) Yoshiki Ohmura (FA)	Tomcat Racing (1–8); Squadra Corse.ch (11)			8	11	7	7	6	6	8	7			13		124
8	(Italy) Luca Marco Spiga (F3)	GTR Racing			12†	3									1	2	95
9	(Italy) Matteo Pollini (L)	LineRace (1–2); CO2 Motorsport (5–8)			11	8			9†	9†	5	4					88
10	(Italy) Paolo Coppi (F3)	LineRace (A–2); PureSport (11–12)	Ret	4	9	DNS									2	1	72
11	(Italy) Francesco Frisone (F3)	Alan Racing			1	1											71
12	(Italy) Paolo Viero (+ 11–12) (F3 A–B) (L 11–12)	LineRace (A–B); GSK Motorsport (5–6); CO2 Motorsport (11–12)	Ret	7					5	1					11	11	68
13	(Italy) Marco Pollara (FA)	Tomcat Racing											4	6	10	6	68
14	(Italy) Enrico Garbelli (+) (L)	AP Motorsport													5	4	42
15	(Italy) Luca Mingotti (+) (L)	AP Motorsport			3	7											40
16	(Italy) Paolo Collivadino (+) (L)	Sarchio Racing	8	10			6	4									40
17	(Italy) Federico Porri (+) (L)	Keks Motorsport					5	6							14†		40
18	(Brazil) Marcus Jardin	GSK Motorsport			14†	2											30
19	(Italy) Gabriele Larini (L)	Torino Motorsport			6	10											28
20	(Italy) Andrea Baiguera (L)	CO2 Motorsport / Brixia	10	9							10†	6					28
21	(Italy) Piero Longhi (+) (L)	CO2 Motorsport													9	7	28
22	(Italy) Paolo Poletii (FA)	CO2 Motorsport									9	9†					24
23	(Italy) Markus Ebner (+) (L)	CO2 Motorsport (7–8); TS Corse (11–12)									6	DSQ			Ret	13†	22
24	(Italy) Maurizio Copetti (F3)	PureSport													15†	8	15
25	(Italy) Antonino Pellegrino (FM)	Pellegrino Racing													Ret		0
26	(Italy) Enrico Milani (F3)	PureSport													Ret		0
The following drivers are not eligible to final standing
–	(Switzerland) Mauro Calamia	Daltec-Interwetten	1	2													0
–	(Switzerland) Christof von Grünigen	Daltec-Interwetten	2	1													0
–	(Italy) Giorgio Roda (FA)	Cram Competition	3	3													0
–	(Italy) Tommaso Menchini (L)	GSK Motorsport	5	6													0
–	(Italy) Emanuele Mari (L)	CG Motorsport	6	11													0
–	(Italy) Nicolò Rocca	Daltec-Interwetten	7	5													0

† = Did not finish but classified for standing

- (−) = Indicate drivers younger than 17 years old.
- (+) = Indicate drivers older than 35 years old.
- (L) = Indicate drivers driving in the Light Class
- (FA)= Formula Abarth
- (FM)= Formula Master
- (F3)= Indicate drivers using Dallara or Mygale Formula 3 chassis.
- (FG)= Formula Gloria
- (w) = indicate women drivers

Pos	Team	Points
1	(Italy) Tomcat Racing	541
2	(Italy) TS Corse	474
3	(Italy) GSK Motorsport	58
4	(Italy) Durango	
5	Di e Gi Motorsport	
6	LineRace	
7	(Italy) PureSport	
8	(Italy) CO2 Motorsport	
9	(Italy) AP Motorsport	
10	Sarchio Racing	
11	Keks Motorsport	
12	(Italy) Alan Racing	
13	(Italy) Team Torino Motorsport	
14	(Italy) Brixia	
15	Pellegrino Racing	

==== 2011 Formula 2000 Light Winter Trophy ====
- Point system: 32, 28, 24, 22, 20, 18, 16, 14, 12, 10, 8, 6, 4, 2, 1 for 15th. Also 3 points for pole position and 2 for fasted lap.

Pos	Driver	Team	Varano 12–13 November		Points
Pos	Driver	Team	1	2	Points
1	(Italy) Massimo Torre (F3)	Morrogh	1	1	69
2	(Italy) Luca Marco Spiga (F3)	GTR Racing	2	3	57
3	(Italy) Pietro Peccenini (+) (L)	TS Corse	6	2	46
4	(Poland) Jakub Śmiechowski	Europol Competition	3	9†	36
5	(Monaco) Alfredo Maisto (+) (FA)	Di e Gi Motorsport	7	5	36
6	(Italy) Marco Zanasi (+) (FA)	Di e Gi Motorsport	4	11†	30
7	(Italy) Simone Gatto (+) (L)	TS Corse	5	10†	30
8	(Japan) Yoshiki Ohmura (FA)	Tomcat Racing	9	7	28
9	(Italy) Daniele Cazzaniga (L)	Di e Gi Motorsport	13†	4	26
10	(Italy) Markus Ebner (+) (L)	TS Corse	11	6	26
11	(France) Remy Kirchdoerffer	Team France	10	8	24
12	(Italy) Dino Lusuardi (F3)	Lusuardi Racing	8	DNS	14
13	(Italy) Giovanni Ciccarelli (F3)	Morrogh	12†	DNS	6

Pos	Team	Points
1	(Italy) / (Republic of Ireland) Henry Morrogh	77
2	Di e Gi Motorsport	66
3	(Italy) TS Corse	64
4	...	...

=== 2011 Formula Renault 2.0 Argentina season ===
All cars use Tito 02 chassis, all races were held in Argentina.

- Point system: 20, 15, 12, 10, 8, 6, 4, 3, 2, 1 for 10th. 1 point for Pole position. 1 extra point in each race for regularly qualified drivers.

Pos	Driver	Team	GRN March 13	SFE April 10	SMA May 1	ZON May 22	SYG June 5	OCA June 26	TRH July 17	MOU August 21	TRE September 11	JUN October 2		POT November 6	Points
1	(Argentina) Rodrigo Rogani	Litoral Group	1	1	1	7	24	1	2	20	1	1	1	1	196
2	(Argentina) Franco Girolami	HRC Proteam (1–3); Gabriel Werner Comp. (4–)	2	28	19	2	1	4	1	5	4	4	6	2	145
3	(Argentina) Mario Gerbaldo	Gabriel Werner Comp. (1–3); Werner Competición (4–)	5	5	6	5	2	23	3	19	2	3	2	7	101
4	(Argentina) Bruno Etman	Gabriel Werner Comp.	4	3	2	3	5	17	18	17	5	5	3	18	99
5	(Argentina) Julián Santero	Castro Racing	7	18	4	6	18	2	5	1	8	6	26	3	97
6	(Argentina) Gianfranco Collino	Litoral Group	18	17	3	1	3	EX		4	3				80
7	(Argentina) Carlos Javier Merlo	Corza Racing	25	24	27	14	9	3	13	3	13	2	25		54
8	(Argentina) Facundo Conta	Werner Junior	8	14	7	4	7	10	7	2	21				49
9	(Argentina) Marcos Muchiut	Werner Competición	12	13	20	25	20	21	4	6	9	9	5	17	41
10	(Argentina) Juan José Garriz	Satorra Competición	14	WD†	13	11	15	6	8	11	15	17	4	5	39
11	(Argentina) Ayrton Molina	Gabriel Werner Comp.	3	4	18	8	23	16	24	12		15	15		35
12	(Argentina) Octavio Chagas	Werner Competición	24	7	23	13	8	19	23	10	12	8	8	4	35
13	(Argentina) Antonino García	FIV Fórmula	6	2	12	20		22	19	15	11	26	13		32
14	(Argentina) Agustín Calamari	Werner Junior	28	6	11	23	4	18	21	28	10	19	16	13	30
15	(Argentina) Federico Moises	Croizet Racing	20	19	5	26	6	EX	20	23		13	7		29
16	(Argentina) Nicolás Cotignola	Schick Team	23†	12		10	16	7	6	7	19	21	11	7	27
17	(Argentina) Matías Vidal	Bouvier Racing	16	11	14	12	10	8	11	29	7	7	21	11	26
18	(Argentina) Emanuel Cáceres	Cáceres Competición	15	20	15	21	12	5		22	24	11	10	10	22
19	(Argentina) Amadis Farina	Bouvier Racing	31	23	24	24	17	11	10	13	6	20	24	16	20
20	(Argentina) Roberto Arato	HRC Proteam	22	15					16	27	14	24	9	6	16
21	(Argentina) Oscar Conta	FIV Fórmula	9	10	22	16	11	20	9	9					15
22	(Argentina) Agustín Giuliani	Litoral Group	13	9	8	15	25	EX	22						12
23	(Argentina) Luciano Farroni	Satorra Competición						9	12	8	16	25	12	20	12
24	(Argentina) Fernando Ayala	Croizet Racing	17	16	16	18	14	26	DNS	14	17	12	14	24	12
25	(Argentina) Matías Galetto	FIV Fórmula	11	27	9			15		21				8	11
26	(Argentina) Nicolás Meichtri	HRC Proteam	29	22	25	19	19	12	17	18		22	18	23	11
27	(Argentina) Gastón Rossi	JLS Motorsport	10	8†	10	9									10
28	(Argentina) Manuel Luque	Litoral Group	26	25	21	27	26†		15	25	23	23	22	12	9
29	(Argentina) Franco Ercoli	Schick Team	21†	26		17	13†	14	DNS	16	18	14	20	15	9
30	(Argentina) Juan Manuel Cabalén	JLS Motorsport						25	14	24	20	18	23		6
31	(Argentina) Franco Mezzelani	JLS Motorsport	19†	29	26	22	21	13							4
32	(Argentina) Ignacio Julián	Castro Racing										10	17	19	4
33	(Argentina) Matías Muñoz	JLS Motorsport	30		17		22								3
34	(Colombia) Juan David Lopez	JLS Motorsport										16	19	14	3
35	(Argentina) Franco Riva	Riva Racing	27	21											2
36	(Argentina) Wilson Borgnino	JLS Motorsport						22						21	1
37	(Uruguay) Francisco Cammarota	JLS Motorsport								26					1

† = Did not qualify regularly

(Needs updating)

Pos	Team	Points
1	(Argentina) Gabriel Werner Comp.	121
2	(Argentina) Litoral Group	114
3	(Argentina) Werner Junior	51?
4	(Argentina) Werner Competición	30
5	(Argentina) FIV Fórmula	26
6	(Argentina) HRC Proteam	15
7	(Argentina) Castro Racing	14
8	(Argentina) Croizet Racing	14
9	(Argentina) JLS Motorsport	6
10	(Argentina) Corza Racing	2
11	(Argentina) Schick Team	1
12	(Argentina) Bouvier Racing	1

=== 2011 Fórmula Renault Plus season ===
The series is held partially on the same rounds than its secondary series Fórmula Renault Interprovencial. It use Crespi chassis.

- Point system: 20, 15, 12, 10, 8, 6, 4, 3, 2, 1 for 10th. Extra 1 point for Pole position. All drivers receive 1 point for take part of the qualifying session.

=== 2011 Fórmula Renault Interprovencial season ===
The series is held in the same rounds than its main series Fórmula Renault Plus.

- Point system: 20, 15, 12, 10, 8, 6, 4, 3, 2, 1 for 10th. Extra 1 point for Pole position. All drivers receive 1 point for take part of the qualifying session.

=== 2011 Fórmula Metropolitana season ===
The series is held in Argentina. Cars use the Renault Clio K4M engine (1598cc) with lower power than the former Fórmula 4 Nacional series held in 2007. Teams can choose chassis manufacturer (Crespi, Tulia, Tito...).

- Point system: 20, 15, 12, 10, 8, 6, 4, 3, 2, 1 for 10th. Extra 1 point for Pole position and 1 point for completed race.

Colour	Result
Gold	Winner
Silver	2nd place
Bronze	3rd place
Green	Finished, in points
Green	Retired, in points
Blue	Finished, no points
Purple	Did not finish (Ret)
Purple	Not classified (NC)
Red	Did not qualify (DNQ)
Black	Disqualified (DSQ)
White	Did not start (DNS)
White	Withdrew (WD)
Blank	Did not participate
Blank	Injured (INJ)
Blank	Excluded (EX)
**Bold**	Pole position
*	Fastest lap
spr	Sprint Race
fea	Feature Race
