= 2024 Honda Indy Toronto =

Indycar race held in Toronto, Ontario

(Canada) 2024 Honda Indy Toronto
Race details
12th round of the 2024 IndyCar season
← Previous race	Next race →
- Layout of the Exhibition Place circuit
- Date: July 21, 2024
- Official name: Ontario Honda Dealers Indy Toronto
- Location: Exhibition Place, Toronto, Ontario, Canada
- Course: Temporary road course 1.786 mi / 2.874 km
- Distance: 85 laps 151.81 mi / 244.314 km

Pole position
- Driver: (United States) Colton Herta (Andretti Global with Curb-Agajanian)
- Time: 0:59.5431

Fastest lap
- Driver: (New Zealand) Scott Dixon (Chip Ganassi Racing)
- Time: 1:01.1392 (on lap 35 of 85)

Podium
- First: (United States) Colton Herta (Andretti Global with Curb-Agajanian)
- Second: (United States) Kyle Kirkwood (Andretti Global)
- Third: (New Zealand) Scott Dixon (Chip Ganassi Racing)

Chronology
Previous	Next
2023	2025

The 2024 Ontario Honda Dealers Indy Toronto was the twelfth round of the 2024 IndyCar season. The race was held from July 19–21, 2024, in Toronto, Ontario, Canada at the Exhibition Place circuit. The race consisted of 85 laps and was won by Colton Herta.

== Entry list ==
Key	Meaning
R	Rookie
W	Past Winner

No.	Driver	Team	Engine
2.	(United States) Josef Newgarden W	Team Penske	Chevrolet
3.	(New Zealand) Scott Mclaughlin	Team Penske	Chevrolet
4.	(Cayman Islands) Kyffin Simpson R	Chip Ganassi Racing	Honda
5.	(Mexico) Patricio O'Ward	Arrow McLaren	Chevrolet
6	(United States) Nolan Siegel R	Arrow McLaren	Chevrolet
7.	(France) Théo Pourchaire R	Arrow McLaren	Chevrolet
8.	(Sweden) Linus Lundqvist R	Chip Ganassi Racing	Honda
9	(New Zealand) Scott Dixon W	Chip Ganassi Racing	Honda
10.	(Spain) Alex Palou	Chip Ganassi Racing	Honda
11.	(New Zealand) Marcus Armstrong	Chip Ganassi Racing	Honda
12.	(Australia) Will Power W	Team Penske	Chevrolet
14.	(United States) Santino Ferrucci	A.J. Foyt Racing	Chevrolet
15.	(United States) Graham Rahal	Rahal Letterman Lanigan Racing	Honda
18.	(New Zealand) Hunter McElrea R	Dale Coyne Racing	Honda
20.	(Denmark) Christian Rasmussen R	Ed Carpenter Racing	Chevrolet
21.	(Netherlands) Rinus VeeKay	Ed Carpenter Racing	Chevrolet
26.	(United States) Colton Herta	Andretti Autosport with Curb Agajanian	Honda
27.	(United States) Kyle Kirkwood	Andretti Autosport	Honda
28.	(Sweden) Marcus Ericsson	Andretti Autosport	Honda
30.	(Brazil) Pietro Fittipaldi	Rahal Letterman Lanigan Racing	Honda
41.	(United States) Sting Ray Robb	A.J. Foyt Racing	Chevrolet
45.	(Denmark) Christian Lundgaard W	Rahal Letterman Lanigan Racing	Honda
51.	(United Kingdom) Tobey Sowery R	Dale Coyne Racing	Honda
60.	(Sweden) Felix Rosenqvist	Meyer Shank Racing	Honda
66.	(United States) David Malukas	Meyer Shank Racing	Honda
77.	(France) Romain Grosjean	Juncos-Hollinger Racing	Chevrolet
78.	(Argentina) Agustin Canapino	Juncos-Hollinger Racing	Chevrolet

=== Notes ===
- No.7: Théo Pourchaire replaces Alexander Rossi after Rossi broke his thumb in practice
- No 51: Tobey Sowery rejoins the entry list for the first time since IndyCar Monterey Grand Prix
- No.18: Hunter Mclrea makes a one off appearance for Dale Coyne

== Practice ==
=== Practice 1 ===
Top Practice Speeds
Pos	No.	Driver	Team	Engine	Lap Time
1	26	(United States) Colton Herta	Andretti Global with Curb-Agajanian	Honda	01:01.8906
2	10	(Spain) Álex Palou	Chip Ganassi Racing	Honda	01:02.0804
3	60	(Sweden) Felix Rosenqvist	Meyer Shank Racing	Honda	01:02.2467

=== Practice 2 ===
Top Practice Speeds
Pos	No.	Driver	Team	Engine	Lap Time
1	26	(United States) Colton Herta	Andretti Global with Curb-Agajanian	Honda	01:00.5763
2	27	(United States) Kyle Kirkwood	Andretti Global	Honda	01:00.7137
3	12	(Australia) Will Power	Team Penske	Chevrolet	01:00.8014

== Qualifying ==
=== Qualifying classification ===
Pos	No.	Driver	Team	Engine	Time				Final grid
Pos	No.	Driver	Team	Engine	Round 1		Round 2	Round 3	Final grid
Pos	No.	Driver	Team	Engine	Group 1	Group 2	Round 2	Round 3	Final grid
1	26	(United States) Colton Herta	Andretti Autosport with Curb-Agajanian	Honda	N/A	01:00.1885	59.7352	59.5431	1
2	27	(United States) Kyle Kirkwood	Andretti Autosport	Honda	01:00.1698	N/A	59.6669	59.6735	2
3	60	(Sweden) Felix Rosenqvist	Meyer Shank Racing	Honda	01:00.4720	N/A	59.5960	59.8252	3

Notes

- **Bold text** indicates fastest time set in session.

== Warmup ==
Top Practice Speeds
Pos	No.	Driver	Team	Engine	Lap Time
1	26	(United States) Colton Herta	Andretti Global with Curb-Agajanian	Honda	01:00.0783
2	2	(United States) Josef Newgarden	Team Penske	Chevrolet	01:00.4076
3	10	(Spain) Álex Palou	Chip Ganassi Racing	Honda	01:00.5190

== Race ==
Colton Herta took his first win of the season over his Andretti Global teammate Kyle Kirkwood.

=== Race results ===
Pos	No.	Driver	Team	Engine	Laps	Time/Retired	Pit Stops	Grid	Laps Led	Pts.
1	26	(United States) Colton Herta	Andretti Autosport with Curb Agajanian	Honda	85	01:39:28.4293	2	1	81	54
2	27	(United States) Kyle Kirkwood	Andretti Autosport	Honda	85	01:39:28.7762	2	2	-	40
3	9	(New Zealand) Scott Dixon **W**	Chip Ganassi Racing	Honda	85	01:39:29.3973	2	15	3	36
4	10	(Spain) Alex Palou	Chip Ganassi Racing	Honda	85	01:39:30.1204	2	18	-	32
5	11	(New Zealand) Marcus Armstrong	Chip Ganassi Racing	Honda	85	01:39:31.2012	2	13	-	30
6	66	(United States) David Malukas	Meyer Shank Racing	Honda	85	01:39:31.5146	2	6	-	28
7	45	(Denmark) Christian Lundgaard **W**	Rahal Letterman Lanigan Racing	Honda	85	01:39:32.3218	2	16	-	26
8	21	(Netherlands) Rinus VeeKay	Ed Carpenter Racing	Chevrolet	85	01:39:33.0639	3	16	-	24
9	77	(France) Romain Grosjean	Juncos Hollinger Racing	Chevrolet	85	01:39:34.0830	2	5	-	22
10	15	(United States) Graham Rahal	Rahal Letterman Lanigan Racing	Honda	85	01:39:34.5749	3	8	-	20
11	2	(United States) Josef Newgarden **W**	Team Penske	Chevrolet	85	01:39:38.9217	3	7	-	19
12	12	(Australia) Will Power **W**	Team Penske	Chevrolet	85	01:39:39.9848	2	9	-	18
13	8	(Sweden) Linus Lundqvist **R**	Chip Ganassi Racing	Honda	84	01:39:35.1306	4	24	-	17
14	7	(France) Théo Pourchaire **R**	Arrow McLaren	Chevrolet	84	01:39:35.5503	5	26	-	16
15	51	(United Kingdom) Toby Sowery **R**	Dale Coyne Racing with Rick Ware Racing	Honda	84	01:39:35.9040	3	21	-	15
16	3	(New Zealand) Scott McLaughlin	Team Penske	Chevrolet	76	Contact	2	4	-	14
17	5	(Mexico) Pato O'Ward	Arrow McLaren	Chevrolet	72	Contact	2	14	-	13
18	28	(Sweden) Marcus Ericsson	Andretti Global	Honda	72	Contact	2	11	1	13
19	30	(Brazil) Pietro Fittipaldi	Rahal Letterman Lanigan Racing	Honda	72	Contact	2	23	-	11
20	14	(United States) Santino Ferrucci	A.J. Foyt Enterprises	Chevrolet	72	Contact	4	17	-	10
21	6	(United States) Nolan Siegel **R**	Arrow McLaren	Chevrolet	72	Contact	3	19	-	9
22	4	(Cayman Islands) Kyffin Simpson **R**	Chip Ganassi Racing	Honda	66	Contact	2	20	-	8
23	60	(Sweden) Felix Rosenqvist	Meyer Shank Racing	Honda	63	Mechanical	2	3	-	7
24	18	(New Zealand) Hunter McElrea **R**	Dale Coyne Racing	Honda	57	Contact	2	25	-	6
25	41	(United States) Sting Ray Robb	A.J. Foyt Enterprises	Chevrolet	13	Mechanical	-	27	-	5
26	78	(Argentina) Agustín Canapino	Juncos Hollinger Racing	Chevrolet	4	Contact	-	10	-	5
27	20	(Denmark) Christian Rasmussen **R**	Ed Carpenter Racing	Chevrolet	0	Contact	-	12	-	5
Fastest lap: (New Zealand) Scott Dixon (Chip Ganassi Racing) – 01:01.1392 (lap 35)
Official Results

Previous race: 2024 Hy-Vee IndyCar Race Weekend	IndyCar Series; 2024 season	Next race: 2024 Bommarito Automotive Group 500
Previous race: 2023 Honda Indy Toronto	Indy Toronto	Next race: 2025 Ontario Honda Dealers Indy Toronto
