= Alberto Canapino =

Argentine racing car preparer (1963–2021)

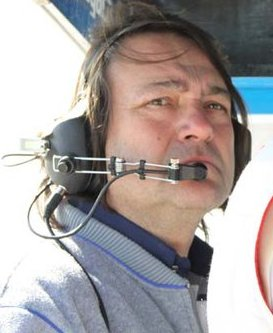
- Born: 23 May 1963; Arrecifes, Buenos Aires, Argentina
- Died: 15 February 2021 (aged 57); Buenos Aires, Argentina
- Occupation: Racing car preparer

Alberto Canapino (23 May 1963 – 15 February 2021) was an Argentine racing car preparer, recognized for his activity at the national level in the different series of motorsport in his country.

== Biography ==
He was recognized in the field of Argentine motor sport, thanks to the achievements obtained by drivers who competed on cars that had his preparation, both in Turismo Carretera, and in other series.

On 3 February 2021, Canapino was admitted to a Buenos Aires clinic with COVID-19 symptoms during the COVID-19 pandemic in Argentina, which worsened and caused his death on 15 February. He is the father of Agustín Canapino, former IndyCar Series driver and multiple Turismo Carretera champion among other categories, and Matías, TC Pista driver.

== Titles achieved as an preparer ==
Year	Category	Driver	Vehicle
1988	TC 2000	Juan María Traverso	Renault Fuego
1989	TC 2000	Miguel Ángel Guerra	Renault Fuego
1995	Turismo Carretera	Juan María Traverso	Chevrolet Chevy Malibu
1995	TC 2000	Juan María Traverso	Peugeot 405
1996	Turismo Carretera	Juan María Traverso	Chevrolet Chevy Malibu
1998	Turismo Carretera	Guillermo Ortelli	Chevrolet Chevy Malibu
2005	Turismo Carretera	Juan Manuel Silva	Ford Falcon
2006	Turismo Carretera	Norberto Fontana	Dodge Cherokee
2007	Turismo Carretera	Christian Ledesma	Chevrolet Chevy Malibu
2007	Copa Mégane	Agustín Canapino	Renault Mégane
2008	TC Pista	Agustín Canapino	Chevrolet Chevy Malibu
2010	Turismo Carretera	Agustín Canapino	Chevrolet Chevy Malibu
2017	Turismo Carretera	Agustín Canapino	Chevrolet Chevy Malibu
2018	Turismo Carretera	Agustín Canapino	Chevrolet Chevy Malibu
2019	Turismo Carretera	Agustín Canapino	Chevrolet Chevy Malibu
