= Autódromo Eusebio Marcilla =

- Full Circuit (2011–present)
- Location: Junín, Buenos Aires Province, Argentina
- Coordinates: 34°39′00″S 61°01′02″W
- Opened: 3 June 1971; 55 years ago Re-opened: 7 August 2011; 15 years ago
- Former names: Autódromo Regional Eusebio Marcilla
- Major events: Current: TC2000 (2011, 2013, 2015, 2025–present); Top Race V6 (2012–2015, 2025–present); Former: Turismo Carretera (2011–2014); Turismo Nacional (2011)

Full Circuit (2011–present)
- Length: 4.200 km (2.610 mi)
- Turns: 7
- Race lap record: 1:22.551 ( (Argentina) Leonel Pernía, Renault Fluence, 2013, Súper TC2000)

Original Circuit (1971–2008)
- Length: 1.400 km (0.870 mi)
- Turns: 4

Autódromo Eusebio Marcilla is a 4.200 km (2.610 mi) motorsports circuit located in Junín, Argentina. The circuit was inaugurated on 3 June 1971, and it was named in honour of Eusebio Marcilla, the circuit was completely redesigned between 2009 and 2011. The redesigned circuit was opened on 7 August 2011 with Turismo Carretera race. Besides Turismo Carretera, the circuit has hosted some other national championships, such as TC2000 Championship and Top Race V6.

== Lap records ==
As of August 2013, the fastest official race lap records at the Autódromo Eusebio Marcilla are listed as:

Category	Time	Driver	Vehicle	Event
Full Circuit (2011–present): 4.200 km (2.610 mi)
Súper TC2000	1:22.551	Leonel Pernía	Renault Fluence	2013 Junín Súper TC2000 round
Turismo Carretera	1:23.791	Mariano Werner	Ford Falcon TC	2013 Junín Turismo Carretera round
Formula Renault 2.0	1:24.715	Carlos Javier Merlo	Tito F4-A	2011 Junín Formula Renault 2.0 Argentina round
