= Autódromo Jorge Ángel Pena =

- Full Circuit (2012–present)
- Location: San Martin, Mendoza, Argentina
- Coordinates: 33°3′35.4″S 68°29′50.7″W
- Opened: 1978
- Former names: Autódromo Ciudad de San Martín-Mendoza
- Major events: Cyrrent: Turismo Nacional (1979, 1987, 1994, 2010, 2014, 2025–present); Former: TC2000 (1995, 2006–2013, 2015–2019); Top Race V6 (2008, 2012–2013, 2018); Turismo Carretera (2012–2013); F3 Sudamericana (1987)

Full Circuit (2012–present)
- Length: 4.167 km (2.589 mi)
- Turns: 12
- Race lap record: 1:19.733 ( (Argentina) Agustín Canapino, Chevrolet Cruze, 2018, TC2000)

Medium Circuit (2006–present)
- Length: 3.585 km (2.228 mi)
- Turns: 10
- Race lap record: 1:20.611 ( (Argentina) Bruno Etman, Tito F4-A, 2011, FR 2.0)

Full Circuit (1994–2005)
- Length: 2.668 km (1.658 mi)
- Turns: 11

Original Circuit (1978–2005)
- Length: 1.602 km (0.995 mi)
- Turns: 7

Old full layout of the circuit (1994–2005)

Autódromo Jorge Ángel Pena is a 4.167 km (2.589 mi) motorsports circuit located in Mendoza, Argentina. It has hosted events in the TC2000 Championship and Formula Renault Argentina series.

== Lap records ==
As of November 2025, the fastest official race lap records at the Autódromo Jorge Ángel Pena are listed as:

Category	Time	Driver	Vehicle	Event
Full Circuit (2012–present): 4.167 km (2.589 mi)
Súper TC2000	1:19.733	Agustín Canapino	Chevrolet Cruze	2018 Mendoza Súper TC2000 round
Turismo Carretera	1:30.204	Juan Bautista de Benedictis	Ford Falcon TC	2013 Mendoza Turismo Carretera round
Formula Renault 2.0	1:31.590	Manuel Luque	Tito F4-A	2012 Mendoza Formula Renault Argentina round
Turismo Carretera 2000	1:32.277	Facundo Ardusso	Honda All New Civic	2025 Mendoza Turismo Carretera 2000 round
Turismo Nacional Clase 3	1:36.241	Agustín Canapino	Toyota Corolla (E210)	2025 Mendoza Turismo Nacional round
Turismo Nacional Clase 2	1:39.855	Bautista Damiani	Toyota Yaris	2025 Mendoza Turismo Nacional round
Medium Circuit (2006–present): 3.585 km (2.228 mi)
Formula Renault 2.0	1:20.611	Bruno Etman	Tito F4-A	2011 Mendoza Formula Renault Argentina round
TC2000	1:20.998	Guillermo Ortelli	Renault Fluence	2011 Mendoza TC2000 round
