= Autódromo Termas de Río Hondo =

Hard surfaced race track in Argerntina

- Grand Prix Circuit (2013–present)
- Location: Termas de Río Hondo, Santiago del Estero, Argentina
- Coordinates: 27°30′21.1″S 64°54′52.1″W
- FIA Grade: 2 (Note: Autódromo Termas de Río Hondo's Grade 2 licence expired 17 July 2019.)
- Broke ground: 2007
- Opened: 10 May 2008; 18 years ago
- Major events: Current: Turismo Carretera (2008–2019, 2022–present); Turismo Nacional (2009, 2011, 2013–2019, 2022, 2024–present); Former: Grand Prix motorcycle racing Argentine motorcycle Grand Prix (2014–2019, 2022–2023, 2025); WTCC; Race of Argentina (2013–2017); TCR South America (2022–2025); Porsche Cup Brasil (2016–2017, 2022–2024); TC2000 (2008–2011, 2013–2018, 2022, 2024); Top Race V6 (2009–2011, 2013–2016, 2018–2019)
- Website: http://autodromotermas.com

Grand Prix Circuit (2013–present)
- Length: 4.805 km (2.986 mi)
- Turns: 14
- Race lap record: 1:38.243 ( (Spain) Marc Márquez, Ducati Desmosedici GP25, 2025, MotoGP)

Short Circuit (2013–present)
- Length: 4.430 km (2.753 mi)
- Turns: 11
- Race lap record: 1:34.695 ( (Argentina) Mariano Werner, Ford Mustang, 2026, TC)

Original Circuit (2008–2012)
- Length: 4.351 km (2.704 mi)
- Turns: 10
- Race lap record: 1:34.005 ( (Argentina) Mariano Werner, Toyota Corolla, 2010, TC2000)

Autódromo Termas de Río Hondo is a 4.805 km (2.986 mi) motorsport circuit located in Termas de Río Hondo, Argentina. The circuit was opened in 2008 and underwent a complete overhaul and rebuild process in 2012, based on design by the Italian circuit designer Jarno Zaffelli.

== Racing background ==
Original layout of the circuit (2008–2012)

The circuit hosted the third round of the Grand Prix motorcycle racing season in 2014 and 2015, bringing Grand Prix motorcycle racing back to Argentina after fifteen years. In 2013, the circuit also hosted Rounds 15 and 16 of the FIA WTCC Race of Argentina of the World Touring Car Championship, and the first MotoGP and Moto2 official tests. The track was to host the Argentine motorcycle Grand Prix in 2013, but the government's nationalisation of the local subsidiary of Repsol, and the ensuing cancellation of gas exports to Argentina raised concerns for the safety of the Honda MotoGP team that is sponsored by the Spanish oil company, forcing a one-year postponement. In previous years, the circuit has also hosted events in the TC2000 Championship, Top Race V6, Turismo Nacional and Formula Renault Argentina series.

On February 6, 2021, the circuit's pit buildings were destroyed due to a fire. No human victims were reported. After the fire, the grandstand, media centre, and pit garages were reconstructed. The reconstruction works were completed before the 2022 Argentine Republic motorcycle Grand Prix.

On 21 March 2023, Penske Entertainment CEO Mark Miles and VP Michael Montri paid a visit to the circuit to tour the property and evaluate the possibility of holding a future IndyCar race at the facility.

== Events ==
Current

- April: GP3 Chile
- May: Turismo Carretera, Turismo Carretera Pista, Fórmula 2 Argentina
- July: Turismo Nacional
- September: Turismo Pista, Turismo Carretera 2000
- October: GP3 Chile

Former

- Formula 4 Sudamericana (2015)
- Fórmula Nacional Argentina (2013–2018, 2022)
- Grand Prix motorcycle racing
  - Argentine motorcycle Grand Prix (2014–2019, 2022–2023, 2025)
- Porsche Cup Brasil (2016–2017, 2022–2024)
- Porsche GT3 Cup Trophy Argentina (2018)
- Top Race NOA (2013–2015)
- TC Junior (2025)
- TC2000 Championship (2008–2011, 2013–2018, 2022, 2024)
- TCR South America Touring Car Championship (2022–2025)
- Top Race V6 (2009–2011, 2013–2016, 2018–2019)
- World Touring Car Championship
  - FIA WTCC Race of Argentina (2013–2017)

== Multiple winners ==
=== Grand Prix motorcycle racing ===
# Wins	Rider	Years won
4	(Spain) Marc Márquez	2014, 2016, 2019, 2025
2	(France) Johann Zarco	2015, 2016
2	(Italy) Marco Bezzecchi	2018, 2023

== Lap records ==
As of May 2026, the fastest official race lap records at the Autódromo Termas de Río Hondo are listed as:

Category	Time	Driver	Vehicle	Event
Grand Prix Circuit (2013–present): 4.805 km (2.986 mi)
MotoGP	1:38.243	Marc Márquez	Ducati Desmosedici GP25	2025 Argentine Republic motorcycle Grand Prix
Porsche Carrera Cup	1:41.243	Guilherme Salas	Porsche 911 (992 I) GT3 Cup	2023 Termas de Río Hondo Porsche Cup Brasil Endurance round
Moto2	1:41.639	Jake Dixon	Boscoscuro B-25	2025 Argentine Republic motorcycle Grand Prix
TC1	1:43.480	Nicky Catsburg	Volvo S60 Polestar TC1	2017 FIA WTCC Race of Argentina
Súper TC2000	1:43.996	Mariano Werner	Peugeot 408	2016 Termas de Río Hondo Súper TC2000 round
Turismo Carretera	1:44.074	Agustín Canapino	Chevrolet Camaro ZL1	2025 Termas de Río Hondo Turismo Carretera round
Moto3	1:47.249	Ángel Piqueras	KTM RC250GP	2025 Argentine Republic motorcycle Grand Prix
TCR Touring Car	1:48.431	Fabricio Pezzini	CUPRA León VZ TCR	2025 Termas de Río Hondo TCR South America round
Turismo Carretera 2000	1:48.899	Luis José Di Palma	Citroën C4 Lounge	2025 Termas de Río Hondo Turismo Carretera 2000 round
Super 2000	1:50.248	Yvan Muller	Chevrolet Cruze 1.6T	2013 FIA WTCC Race of Argentina
Formula Renault 2.0	1:50.656	Martín Moggia	Tito F4-A	2015 Termas de Río Hondo Formula Renault Argentina round
Formula Renault 1.6	1:51.182	Pedro Caland	Signatech FR 1.6	2015 Termas de Río Hondo F4 Sudamericana round
Top Race V6	1:51.571	Mariano Altuna	Chevrolet Cruze I	2018 2nd Termas de Río Hondo Top Race V6 round
Short Circuit (2013–present): 4.430 km (2.753 mi)
Turismo Carretera	1:34.695	Mariano Werner	Ford Mustang	2026 Termas de Río Hondo Turismo Carretera round
Original Circuit (2008–2012): 4.351 km (2.704 mi)
TC2000	1:34.005	Mariano Werner	Toyota Corolla	2010 Termas de Río Hondo TC2000 round
Turismo Carretera	1:34.162	Gabriel Ponce de León	Ford Falcon TC	2010 Termas de Río Hondo Turismo Carretera round
Formula Renault 2.0	1:34.779	Franco Girolami	Tito F4-A	2011 Termas de Río Hondo Formula Renault Argentina round
