= Ezequiel Bosio =

Argentine racing driver

Ezequiel Raúl Bosio (born April 12, 1985 in Santa Fe) is an Argentine racing driver. He has run in different series, with major success in Formula Renault Argentina and TC 2000.

== Career ==
- 2003: Argentine Formula Renault Runner Up
- 2004: Argentine Formula Renault Champion
- 2005: TC Pista runner-up
- 2007: TC2000 (Honda Civic) won the 200 km de Buenos Aires
- 2008: Turismo Carretera
- 2009: TC2000 (Honda Civic)

Sporting positions
Preceded by Maximiliano Merlino	Argentine Formula Renault Champion; 2004	Succeeded by Lucas Benamo
Preceded by Matías Rossi; Alain Menu	Winner of the 200 km de Buenos Aires; 2007 (with Juan Manuel Silva)	Succeeded by José María López; Anthony Reid
