= Lucas Benamo =

Argentine racing driver

Enrique Lucas Benamo (born February 19, 1985) is an Argentinian former racing driver. He mostly raced in TC2000 and Turismo Nacional Clase 3.

After his retirement, he became a coach for race car drivers. Among whom are Franco Colapinto and Ignacio Montenegro.

== Racing career summary ==
- 2001: Formula Renault Argentina
- 2002: Formula Renault Argentina
- 2003: Formula Renault Argentina
- 2004: Formula Renault Argentina, Runner-up
- 2005: Formula Renault Argentina, Champion
- 2006: Formula Renault Italia, TC2000
- 2007: Turismo Nacional Clase 3
- 2008: TC2000
- 2009: Turismo Nacional Clase 3
- 2010: Turismo Nacional Clase 3
- 2011: Top Race Series
- 2012: Top Race Series, Runner-up
- 2013: TC Pista, Top Race V6
- 2014: Top Race V6
- 2015: Súper TC2000
- 2016: Súper TC2000
- 2017: Súper TC2000

Sporting positions
Preceded by Ezequiel Bosio	Argentine Formula Renault Champion; 2005	Succeeded by Mariano Werner
