= Autódromo Mar y Valle =

Motor racing track in Trelew, Chubut Province, Argentina

- Full Circuit (2010–present)
- Location: Trelew, Chubut Province, Argentina
- Coordinates: 43°18′06″S 65°16′17″W
- Owner: Asociación Mar y Valle
- Broke ground: 23 May 1985; 40 years ago
- Opened: 16 March 1986; 40 years ago
- Major events: Former: Turismo Nacional (1988, 1994, 2013, 2021–2022, 2024); TC2000 Championship (1994–1997, 1999–2000, 2003, 2011, 2016); Turismo Carretera (1996–1999, 2001–2002, 2010–2014, 2016); Top Race V6 (2012)

Full Circuit (2010–present)
- Length: 3.916 km (2.433 mi)
- Turns: 12
- Race lap record: 1:18.548 ( (Argentina) Matías Rossi, Chevrolet Chevy, 2016, TC)

Full Circuit (1992–2009)
- Length: 4.010 km (2.492 mi)
- Turns: 16
- Race lap record: 1:32.006 ( (Argentina) Marcelo Bugliotti, Honda Civic VI, 1999, TC2000)

Original Circuit (1986–1991)
- Length: 1.986 km (1.234 mi)
- Turns: 8

Autódromo Mar y Valle is a 3.916 km (2.433 mi) motorsports circuit located on the 9 km (5.6 mi) southeast of Trelew, Argentina. The circuit has hosted national events, such as TC2000 Championship, Turismo Nacional, and Turismo Carretera.

The circuit was built in 1985, opened in 1986. It was also renovated in 2010. Before its renovation, the circuit had length of 4.010 km (2.492 mi).

== Lap records ==
As of February 2024, the fastest official race lap records at the Autódromo Mar y Valle are listed as:

Category	Time	Driver	Vehicle	Event
Full Circuit (2010–present): 3.916 km (2.433 mi)
Turismo Carretera	1:18.548	Matías Rossi	Chevrolet Chevy	2016 Trelew Turismo Carretera round
Súper TC2000	1:19.666	Leonel Pernía	Renault Fluence	2016 Trelew Súper TC2000 round
Formula Renault 2.0	1:21.366	Rodrigo Rogani	Tito F4-A	2011 Trelew Formula Renault 2.0 Argentina round
Turismo Nacional Clase 3	1:23.330	Leonel Larrauri	Honda Civic IX	2024 1st Trelew Turismo Nacional round
Turismo Nacional Clase 2	1:26.517	Maximiliano Bestani	Toyota Etios	2022 Trelew Turismo Nacional round
Full Circuit (1992–2009): 4.010 km (2.492 mi)
TC2000	1:32.006	Marcelo Bugliotti	Honda Civic VI	1999 Trelew TC2000 round
