= 2004 TC 2000 Championship =

Seasons
- ← 2003 2005 →

The 2004 TC 2000 Championship was the 26th Turismo Competicion 2000 season.

== Final standings ==
Pos	Driver	GR	VIE	SJ	PAR	SL	OBE	AG	CON	RC	SR	BB	BA	RAF	MDP	Pts
1	(Argentina) Christian Ledesma	1	8	2	Ret	1	1	3	1	10	17	3	2	7	Ret	150
2	(Argentina) Gabriel Ponce de León	3	1	DSQ	Ret	16†	10	12	DSQ	2	1	6	1	Ret	1	126
3	(Argentina) Marcelo Bugliotti	Ret	10	Ret	5	2	6	1	4	6	15	8	3	1	5	115
4	(Argentina) Juan Manuel Silva	Ret	Ret	11†	6	4	2	5	Ret	3	7	2	18†	3	16†	112
5	(Argentina) Norberto Fontana	4	Ret	10†	1	7	Ret	7	Ret	5	5	10	Ret	4	4	103
6	(Argentina) Gabriel Furlán	9†	3	1	2	10	3	10	Ret	Ret	6	Ret	Ret	2	Ret	91
7	(Argentina) Martín Basso	Ret	12	8	8	Ret	Ret	2	10	14†	4	1	6	Ret	6	87
8	(Argentina) Fabián Yannantuoni	5	Ret	13†	15†	8	7	14†	7	1	2	4	17†	11	Ret	82
9	(Argentina) Esteban Tuero	Ret	4	3	11	6	4	Ret	3	Ret	3	Ret	Ret	Ret	15†	69
10	(Argentina) Diego Aventín		2	Ret	16†	3	11	8	2	4	Ret	Ret	DSQ	9	9	68
11	(Argentina) Guillermo Ortelli	2	13†	DSQ	3	5	9	4	5	11†	Ret	Ret	22†		14	60
12	(Argentina) Carlos Okulovich	6	5	5	7	14	Ret	Ret	Ret	Ret	Ret	5	Ret		8	42
13	(Argentina) Oscar Fineschi	Ret	11†	Ret	9	15†	Ret	9	Ret	Ret	11	Ret	Ret	8	3	36
14	(Argentina) Luis Belloso	7	Ret	4	Ret	12	Ret	6	11†	Ret	9	9	4	14	7	31
15	(Argentina) Nicolás Vuyovich	Ret	Ret	Ret	4	DNS	5	Ret	8	Ret	8	Ret	23†	Ret	Ret	28
16	(Argentina) Emiliano Spataro											Ret	8	5	2	26
17	(Argentina) Lucas Armellini	Ret	6	12†	Ret	Ret	8	11	Ret	Ret						16
18	(Argentina) Mariano Bainotti	8	7	Ret	10	17†				7	10	Ret	12	16†		13
19	(Argentina) Juan Pablo Satorra		Ret	6	13	Ret	13	Ret	6	DSQ	12	11	13	Ret	17†	12
20	(Argentina) Leandro Carducci	Ret	9	Ret	Ret	9	12	Ret	12†	Ret	Ret	7	10	10	Ret	10
21	(Argentina) Nelson García				Ret	Ret	17	Ret	Ret	13†	Ret	13†	Ret	6	Ret	8
22	(Argentina) Luis Soppelsa			7	14	Ret	Ret	13†	13	9	23†					6
23	(Argentina) Crispín Beitía						Ret	Ret	DSQ	Ret	13	Ret	5	15†	Ret	4
24	(Argentina) Aníbal Zaniratto					13	Ret	17†	Ret	8	14	Ret	Ret			3
25	(Argentina) Nicolás Kern				Ret	DNS	16	Ret	9	Ret	20†	Ret	11	Ret	11	2
26	(Argentina) Maximiliano Merlino		Ret	9												2
27	(Argentina) Gabriel Adamoli						Ret	16†	Ret	Ret	22†	14†	7	Ret	10	1
–	(Chile) Julio Infante								Ret	Ret	19	Ret	9	12	Ret	–
–	(Argentina) Ezequiel Toia				Ret	11	14	Ret	Ret	Ret	Ret	DSQ	Ret		Ret	–
–	(Argentina) Laureano Campanera		Ret	Ret	12	Ret	15	Ret	Ret	Ret	16	Ret	14	Ret	DSQ	–
–	(Argentina) Fabricio Pezzini					Ret	Ret	Ret	Ret		24†	Ret	21†	13	WD	–
–	(Argentina) Federico Lifschitz											12†	15			–
–	(Argentina) Gustavo Der Ohanessian					Ret	18	15†	Ret	12†	18	Ret	20†		Ret	–
–	(Argentina) Leonel Larrauri										21†	Ret	19†		Ret	–
–	(Argentina) Nicolás Filiberti		DNS	14†	NL	Ret	Ret									–
–	(Argentina) Roberto Corletta		DNS	Ret	Ret	Ret										–
-	(Argentina) Oscar Canela								Ret	DNS				DNS	Ret	–
–	(Argentina) Rubén Valsagna							Ret	Ret					DNS		–
Drivers ineligible to score points
–	(Argentina) Julián Crespo												16			–
–	(Argentina) Martín Di Cola												DNS	Ret	12	–
–	(Argentina) Rubén Salerno														13	–
–	(Argentina) Pedro Comito														Ret	–
Pos	Driver	GR	VIE	SJ	PAR	SL	OBE	AG	CON	RC	SR	BB	BA	RAF	MDP	Pts

Colour	Result
Gold	Winner
Silver	Second place
Bronze	Third place
Green	Points classification
Blue	Non-points classification
Blue	Non-classified finish (NC)
Purple	Retired, not classified (Ret)
Red	Did not qualify (DNQ)
Red	Did not pre-qualify (DNPQ)
Black	Disqualified (DSQ)
White	Did not start (DNS)
White	Withdrew (WD)
White	Race cancelled (C)
Blank	Did not practice (DNP)
Blank	Did not arrive (DNA)
Blank	Excluded (EX)

**Bold** – Pole position
Italics – Fastest lap
† – Retired, but classified

== Race calendar and winners ==
Date	Race	Track	Winner	Results
4 April	1	(Argentina) General Roca	(Argentina) Christian Ledesma	Results
25 April	2	(Argentina) Viedma	(Argentina) Gabriel Ponce de León	Results
9 May	3	(Argentina) San Juan	(Argentina) Gabriel Furlán	Results
30 May	4	(Argentina) Paraná	(Argentina) Norberto Fontana	Results
20 June	5	(Argentina) San Luis	(Argentina) Christian Ledesma	Results
4 July	6	(Argentina) Oberá	(Argentina) Christian Ledesma	Results
25 July	7	(Argentina) Cordoba	(Argentina) Marcelo Bugliotti	Results
8 August	8	(Argentina) Concordia	(Argentina) Christian Ledesma	Results
29 August	9	(Argentina) Rio Cuarto	(Argentina) Fabian Yannantuoni	Results
19 September	10	(Argentina) San Rafael	(Argentina) Gabriel Ponce de León	Results
17 October	11	(Argentina) Bahía Blanca	(Argentina) Martín Basso	Results
31 October	12	(Argentina) Buenos Aires	(Argentina) Gabriel Ponce de León (Argentina) Patricio Di Palma	Results
14 November	13	(Argentina) Rafaela	(Argentina) Marcelo Bugliotti	Results
5 December	14	(Argentina) Mar del Plata	(Argentina) Gabriel Ponce de León	Results
