= 2007 TC 2000 Championship =

Seasons
- ← 2006 2008 →

The 2007 TC 2000 Championship was the 29th Turismo Competicion 2000 season.

== Final standings ==
=== Top 10 ===
Position	Number	Driver	Car	Points
1	1	(Argentina) Matías Rossi	Chevrolet Astra	189
2	6	(Argentina) Martín Basso	Ford Focus	142
3	2	(Argentina) Christian Ledesma	Chevrolet Astra	108
4	7	(Argentina) Guillermo Ortelli	Renault Megane	105
5	37	(Argentina) José María López	Honda Civic	104
6	8	(Argentina) Emiliano Spataro	Renault Megane	99
7	2	(Argentina) Juan Manuel Silva	Honda Civic	92
8	57	(Brazil) Cacá Bueno	Honda Civic	92
9	5	(Argentina) Gabriel Ponce de León	Ford Focus	87
10	44	(Argentina) Marcelo Bugliotti	Chevrolet Astra	10

== Race calendar and winners ==
Fecha	Race	Track	Win	Results
04/03	1	(Argentina) Comodoro Rivadavia	(Argentina) Marcelo Bugliotti	Results
25/03	2	(Argentina) General Roca	(Argentina) Gabriel Ponce de León	Results
15/04	2	(Argentina) Bahía Blanca	(Argentina) Matías Rossi	Results
29/04	4	(Argentina) Mendoza	(Argentina) Juan Manuel Silva	Results
20/05	5	(Argentina) San Juan	(Argentina) Christian Ledesma	Results
17/06	6	(Brazil) São Paulo	(Argentina) Marcelo Bugliotti	Results
01/07	7	(Argentina) Cordoba	(Argentina) Martín Basso	Results
22/07	8	(Argentina) Santa Fe	(Argentina) Matías Rossi	Results
02/09	9	(Argentina) San Rafael	(Argentina) José María López	Results
16/09	10	(Argentina) Viedma	(Argentina) José María López	Results
07/10	11	(Argentina) Buenos Aires	(Argentina) Juan Manuel Silva (Argentina) Ezequiel Bosio	Results
18/11	12	(Argentina) Oberá	(Argentina) José María López	Results
02/12	13	(Argentina) San Luis	(Argentina) Matías Rossi	Results
16/12	14	(Uruguay) Punta del Este	(Argentina) Martín Basso	Results
