= 2006 TC 2000 Championship =

Seasons
- ← 2005 2007 →

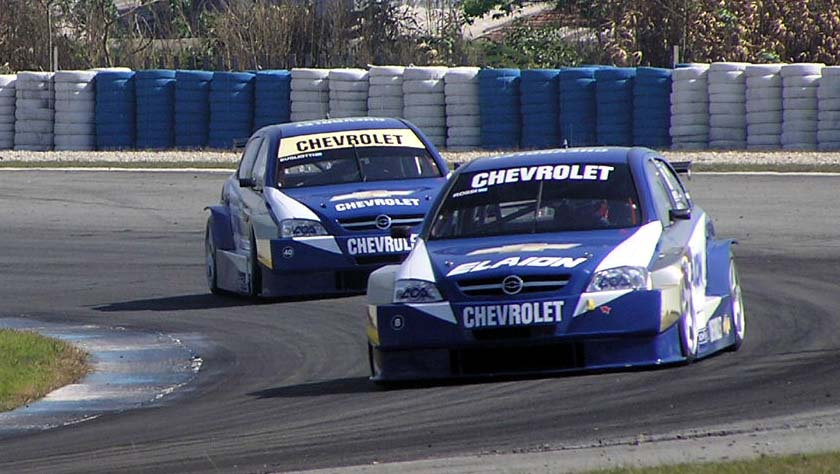
Matías Rossi (leading, ahead of teammate Marcelo Bugliotti) edged out Juan Manuel Silva by one point.

The 2006 TC 2000 Championship was the 28th Turismo Competicion 2000 season.

== Final standings ==
Pos	Driver	BA	OLA	CR	VIE	SF	SJ	SR	RES	CUR	SM	GR	BA	OBE	PAR	Pts
1	(Argentina) Matías Rossi	1	2	3	1	Ret	7	4	2	15	1	5	1	Ret	1	186
2	(Argentina) Juan Manuel Silva	3	Ret	4	2	6	4	2	1	1	5	7	Ret	1	2	185
3	(Argentina) Gabriel Ponce de León	4	1	Ret	5	2	Ret	1	7	20	2	1	Ret	2	6	166
4	(Argentina) Martín Basso	9	13	19	Ret	1	1	11	15†	3	3	3	2	20†	3	155
5	(Argentina) Christian Ledesma	5	11	1	Ret	3	20	6	9	2	Ret	2	Ret	3	5	119
6	(Argentina) Guillermo Ortelli	2	3	8	12†	7	3	8	4	8	6	Ret	6	Ret	15	95
7	(Argentina) Norberto Fontana	6	Ret	11	8	DNS	2	Ret	Ret	4	DSQ	Ret	Ret	Ret	4	95
8	(Argentina) Fabián Flaqué	Ret	5	6	6	DSQ	19	3	12	10	4	6	3	9	13	79
9	(Argentina) Emiliano Spataro	8	4	Ret	Ret	5	8	12	18†	17	7	4	4	12	9	54
10	(Argentina) Mariano Altuna	Ret	10	2	7	11†	6	Ret	20†	5	12	11	12†	7	11	53
11	(Argentina) Gabriel Furlán	Ret	6	Ret	Ret	Ret	5	9	3	7	13	Ret	Ret	Ret	14	46
12	(Argentina) Fabián Yannantuoni	7	8	Ret	Ret	Ret	10	5	6	9	Ret	Ret	Ret	Ret	18	43
13	(Argentina) Diego Aventín	Ret	7	7	Ret	10†	Ret	20†	Ret	12	8	12	Ret	Ret	7	38
14	(Argentina) Carlos Okulovich	Ret	9	10	3	Ret	16	Ret	Ret	Ret	Ret	17†	Ret	4	12	31
15	(Argentina) Oscar Fineschi	Ret	Ret	Ret	4	4	21†	Ret	Ret	Ret	Ret	8	Ret	Ret	8	30
16	(Argentina) Nelson García	Ret	12	5	Ret	Ret	9	15	5	21	11	Ret	Ret	17	20	18
17	(Argentina) Lucas Benamo	17†	21	Ret	Ret							9	5	11	Ret	12
18	(Argentina) Emanuel Moriatis						Ret	13	8	14	Ret		Ret	5	24†	11
19	(Argentina) Marcelo Bugliotti				11†	DNS	15	14	13	6	17†	Ret	Ret	18	Ret	10
20	(Argentina) Lucas Armellini	Ret	Ret	Ret	Ret	Ret	Ret	Ret	19†	16	9	13	Ret	10	Ret	10
21	(Argentina) Crispín Beitía	14	15	20†	Ret	Ret	12	18	10	23†	14	Ret	Ret	6	21	8
22	(Argentina) Leandro Carducci	15	19	12	Ret	Ret	Ret	16	16	Ret	Ret	Ret	7	8	Ret	8
23	(Argentina) Esteban Tuero	13	17	9	DNS	Ret	11	7								6
24	(Argentina) Rubén Salerno											14	8	Ret	19	4
25	(Argentina) Gustavo Der Ohanessian	Ret	DNS		Ret	8	17	Ret	Ret	22†	Ret		Ret	Ret	17	4
26	(Argentina) Maximiliano Merlino	16	DNS	18	Ret								9	22†	Ret	3
27	(Argentina) Juan Pablo Satorra					9	Ret	Ret								3
28	(Argentina) Nicolás Kern	12	Ret	Ret	9	Ret	14						Ret		16	2
29	(Argentina) Mariano Bainotti	Ret	18	15	DNS	Ret	13	10	Ret	13	Ret	10	Ret	15	Ret	2
30	(Argentina) Aníbal Zaniratto			14	10	WD	18	17	Ret	18	10					2
31	(Argentina) Guillermo Valle									Ret	16	16	10	19†	23	2
32	(Argentina) Leonel Pernía													13	10	1
33	(Argentina) Rafael Moro	10	16	17	DNS	Ret	Ret		Ret	19	Ret	Ret	Ret	21†	Ret	1
34	(Argentina) Jorge Trebbiani	Ret	14	Ret	Ret	Ret	Ret	19					Ret	16	Ret	0
–	(Argentina) Franco Coscia	Ret	Ret	13	DSQ	DNS	Ret	21†	Ret	11	DNS	15	Ret	14	Ret	–
–	(Argentina) Ezequiel Bosio								11	Ret	15	Ret	Ret	23†	22	–
–	(Argentina) Fabricio Pezzini	11	Ret	16	Ret											–
–	(Argentina) Gabriel Adamoli	Ret	20	Ret	Ret			Ret	17	Ret	18†	Ret	11†	Ret	Ret	–
–	(Argentina) Lucas Dionisi								14							–
–	(Argentina) Federico Suárez Salvia	WD	22	Ret			22†									–
–	(Argentina) Pedro Pisandelli	Ret	Ret	Ret	Ret								Ret			–
–	(Argentina) José Luis Raponi				Ret	DSQ		Ret								–
–	(Argentina) Daniel Belli								Ret	Ret	Ret		Ret		Ret	–
–	(Argentina) Gerardo Martín										Ret					–
–	(Chile) Julio Infante										Ret					–
–	(Argentina) Guillermo Castellanos												Ret			–
–	(Argentina) Julio Catalán Magni												Ret			–
–	(Argentina) Enrique Santacaterina														Ret	–
–	(France) Carlos Mel Banfi														WD	–
Pos	Driver	BA	OLA	CR	VIE	SF	SJ	SR	RES	CUR	SM	GR	BA	OBE	PAR	Pts

Colour	Result
Gold	Winner
Silver	Second place
Bronze	Third place
Green	Points classification
Blue	Non-points classification
Blue	Non-classified finish (NC)
Purple	Retired, not classified (Ret)
Red	Did not qualify (DNQ)
Red	Did not pre-qualify (DNPQ)
Black	Disqualified (DSQ)
White	Did not start (DNS)
White	Withdrew (WD)
White	Race cancelled (C)
Blank	Did not practice (DNP)
Blank	Did not arrive (DNA)
Blank	Excluded (EX)

**Bold** – Pole position
Italics – Fastest lap
† – Retired, but classified

== Race calendar and winners ==
Date	Race	Track	Win	Results
26 February	1	(Argentina) Buenos Aires	(Argentina) Matías Rossi	Results
12 March	2	(Argentina) Olavarría	(Argentina) Gabriel Ponce de León	Results
2 April	3	(Argentina) Comodoro Rivadavia	(Argentina) Christian Ledesma	Results
23 April	4	(Argentina) Viedma	(Argentina) Matías Rossi	Results
7 May	5	(Argentina) Santa Fe	(Argentina) Martín Basso	Results
28 May	6	(Argentina) San Juan	(Argentina) Martín Basso	Results
25 June	7	(Argentina) Rafaela	(Argentina) Gabriel Ponce de León	Results
23 July	8	(Argentina) Resistencia	(Argentina) Juan Manuel Silva	Results
13 August	9	(Brazil) Curitiba	(Argentina) Juan Manuel Silva	Results
10 September	10	(Argentina) San Martin	(Argentina) Matías Rossi	Results
1 October	11	(Argentina) General Roca	(Argentina) Gabriel Ponce de León	Results
29 October	12	(Argentina) Buenos Aires	(Argentina) Matías Rossi (Switzerland) Alain Menu	Results
12 November	13	(Argentina) Oberá	(Argentina) Juan Manuel Silva	Results
26 November	14	(Argentina) Paraná	(Argentina) Matías Rossi	Results
