= 2005 TC 2000 Championship =

Motor racing competition

Seasons
- ← 2004 2006 →

Following are the results of the 2005 TC 2000 season. The TC 2000 Championship (Turismo Competición 2000) is a touring car racing series held in Argentina since 1979. The 2005 season was its 27th season.

== Final standings ==
Pos	Driver	BA	PAR	VIE	SJ	OLA	AG	CUR	OBE	RAF	SR	CON	BA	SL	GR	Pts
1	(Argentina) Gabriel Ponce de León	9	Ret	1	Ret	1	2	9	2	1	1	3	Ret	6	4	173
2	(Argentina) Diego Aventín	6	9	2	Ret	2	4	Ret	1	4	11	5	1	5	7	134
3	(Argentina) Emiliano Spataro	1	18†	6	5	6	16†	1	4	2	15	Ret	2	15	6	117
4	(Argentina) Martín Basso	Ret	2	4	3	9	Ret	14	Ret	12	17	6	6	1	3	103
5	(Argentina) Juan Manuel Silva	14	16†	5	6	3	6	17	Ret	10	4	14	Ret	4	1	92
6	(Argentina) Christian Ledesma	4	4	Ret	7	Ret	1	3	6	1	5	11	3	Ret	19†	89
7	(Argentina) Norberto Fontana	Ret	Ret	10	2	Ret	Ret	7	Ret	Ret	2	2	17†	2	Ret	83
8	(Argentina) Guillermo Ortelli	2	Ret	11	9	7	18†	Ret	5	11	8	1	5	12	Ret	64
9	(Argentina) Matías Rossi	5	1	16	8	5	Ret	15	18†	3	13	4	Ret	Ret	DNS	64
10	(Argentina) Gabriel Furlán	11	11	9	13	12	3	2	Ret	9	16	DNS	DNS	3	2	63
11	(Argentina) Fabián Yannantuoni	7	Ret	3	4	Ret	15†	13	15	Ret	3	18	4	Ret	Ret	56
12	(Argentina) Nelson García	10	6	15	18†	5	Ret	10	3	6	9	15	10	8	Ret	47
13	(Argentina) Nicolás Vuyovich	8	Ret	Ret	1											29
14	(Argentina) Oscar Fineschi	DSQ	5	Ret	Ret	23†	Ret	5	9	14	6	Ret	Ret	Ret	18†	27
15	(Argentina) Esteban Tuero	Ret	3	26†	Ret	Ret	Ret		8	20†	7	7	Ret	DNS	10	26
16	(Argentina) Carlos Okulovich	3	Ret	13	12	17	Ret	6	Ret	Ret	Ret	Ret	11	9	8	24
17	(Argentina) Crispín Beitía	Ret	Ret	Ret	DNQ	18	Ret	19†	Ret	5	12	8	9	11	5	24
18	(Argentina) Mariano Bainotti	Ret	7	7	Ret	Ret	5		Ret	8	18	10	16	20†	16	20
19	(Argentina) Fabián Flaqué	Ret	15	22	11	11	7	11	Ret	7	10	9	8	7	Ret	20
20	(Argentina) Mariano Altuna		12	DNS	15	8	14†	4	DSQ	13	23†	Ret	7	21†	Ret	19
21	(Argentina) Leandro Carducci	15†	DNS	12	10	13	13	8	11	15	25†	12	Ret	22†	9	6
22	(Argentina) Juan Pablo Satorra	Ret	Ret	21	DNQ	10	Ret	Ret	10	17	Ret	Ret	15	Ret	Ret	5
23	(Argentina) Fabricio Pezzini	Ret	Ret	Ret	17	Ret	11		7	16	14	19†	Ret	Ret	13	4
24	(Argentina) Rafael Moro	Ret	8	14	16	16	Ret		Ret	Ret	27†	17	Ret	10	Ret	4
25	(Argentina) Luis Belloso	Ret	Ret	8	Ret	14	17†	12	16	22†	24†	Ret	13	13	15	3
26	(Argentina) Rubén Salerno			17	DNQ	22†	8	16	17	19	Ret	Ret	Ret			3
27	(Argentina) Gustavo Der Ohanessian	16†	Ret	18	14	15	9	20†	12	24†	19	16	Ret	16	11	2
28	(Argentina) Gabriel Adamoli	12	10	20	Ret	19	Ret	DSQ	Ret	Ret	Ret	20	Ret	19	14	1
29	(Argentina) Sergio Sessa						10	18	Ret	Ret	21	Ret	Ret	Ret	Ret	1
30	(Argentina) Maximiliano Merlino	Ret	Ret	19	Ret	21†	DSQ		Ret	Ret	Ret	Ret	Ret	Ret	Ret	1
–	(Argentina) Jorge Trebbiani								Ret		Ret	13	Ret	14	12	–
–	(Argentina) Aníbal Zaniratto	Ret	Ret	Ret	Ret	Ret	Ret	Ret	13	18	Ret	Ret	12	18	Ret	–
–	(Argentina) Marcelo Bugliotti				DSQ	DNS	12			DNS	22†	Ret				–
–	(Argentina) Ezequiel Toia	13	Ret	23	DNQ											–
–	(Argentina) Oscar Canela	Ret	13	25	DNQ					Ret						–
–	(Argentina) Franco Coscia			Ret	Ret	Ret	Ret		14	21	Ret	23†	Ret	Ret	17	–
–	(Argentina) Nicolás Kern	Ret	14	27†	19†	Ret	Ret	Ret	Ret	Ret						–
–	(Chile) Julio Infante										26†	Ret	14	Ret	Ret	–
–	(Argentina) Rafael Morgenstern	Ret	17†	24†	Ret	Ret										–
–	(Argentina) Martín Di Cola	Ret	DNS			20	Ret		DNQ	23	20	21	DNS	Ret		–
–	(Argentina) Julio Catalán Magni				DNQ		DNS					22				–
–	(Argentina) Diego Menéndez		Ret	Ret	Ret											–
–	(Argentina) José Luis Raponi	Ret	WD	WD		DNQ			DNQ	DNQ		WD				–
–	(Argentina) Alejandro Occhionero	Ret	DNS													–
–	(Argentina) Rubén Valsagna	Ret														–
–	(Argentina) Martín Ferrari	WD	Ret													–
–	(Argentina) Federico Suárez Salvia		Ret				WD									–
–	(Argentina) Leonel Larrauri			Ret												–
–	(Argentina) Javier Manta								DNQ		DNS	WD	DNS			–
–	(Argentina) Leonardo Palotini					DNQ										–
Drivers ineligible to score points
–	(Argentina) Laureano Campanera													17	20†	–
–	(Argentina) Gustavo Fontana												DNS			–
Pos	Driver	BA	PAR	VIE	SJ	OLA	AG	CUR	OBE	RAF	SR	CON	BA	SL	GR	Pts

Colour	Result
Gold	Winner
Silver	Second place
Bronze	Third place
Green	Points classification
Blue	Non-points classification
Blue	Non-classified finish (NC)
Purple	Retired, not classified (Ret)
Red	Did not qualify (DNQ)
Red	Did not pre-qualify (DNPQ)
Black	Disqualified (DSQ)
White	Did not start (DNS)
White	Withdrew (WD)
White	Race cancelled (C)
Blank	Did not practice (DNP)
Blank	Did not arrive (DNA)
Blank	Excluded (EX)

**Bold** – Pole position
Italics – Fastest lap
† – Retired, but classified

== Race calendar and winners ==
Date	Race	Track	Win	Results
6 March	1	(Argentina) Buenos Aires	(Argentina) Emiliano Spataro	Results
27 March	2	(Argentina) Paraná	(Argentina) Matías Rossi	Results
17 April	3	(Argentina) Viedma	(Argentina) Gabriel Ponce de León	Results
8 May	4	(Argentina) San Juan	(Argentina) Nicolás Vuyovich	Results
29 May	5	(Argentina) Olavarría	(Argentina) Gabriel Ponce de León	Results
26 June	6	(Argentina) Cordoba	(Argentina) Christian Ledesma	Results
24 July	7	(Brazil) Curitiba	(Argentina) Emiliano Spataro	Results
14 August	8	(Argentina) Oberá	(Argentina) Diego Aventín	Results
4 September	9	(Argentina) Rafaela	(Argentina) Gabriel Ponce de León	Results
25 September	10	(Argentina) San Rafael	(Argentina) Gabriel Ponce de León	Results
9 October	11	(Argentina) Concordia	(Argentina) Guillermo Ortelli	Results
30 October	12	(Argentina) Buenos Aires	(Argentina) Diego Aventín (Brazil) Luciano Burti	Results
13 November	13	(Argentina) San Luis	(Argentina) Gabriel Ponce de León	Results
4 December	14	(Argentina) General Roca	(Argentina) Juan Manuel Silva	Results
