= 2020 Súper TC2000 =

Seasons
- ← 2019 2021 →

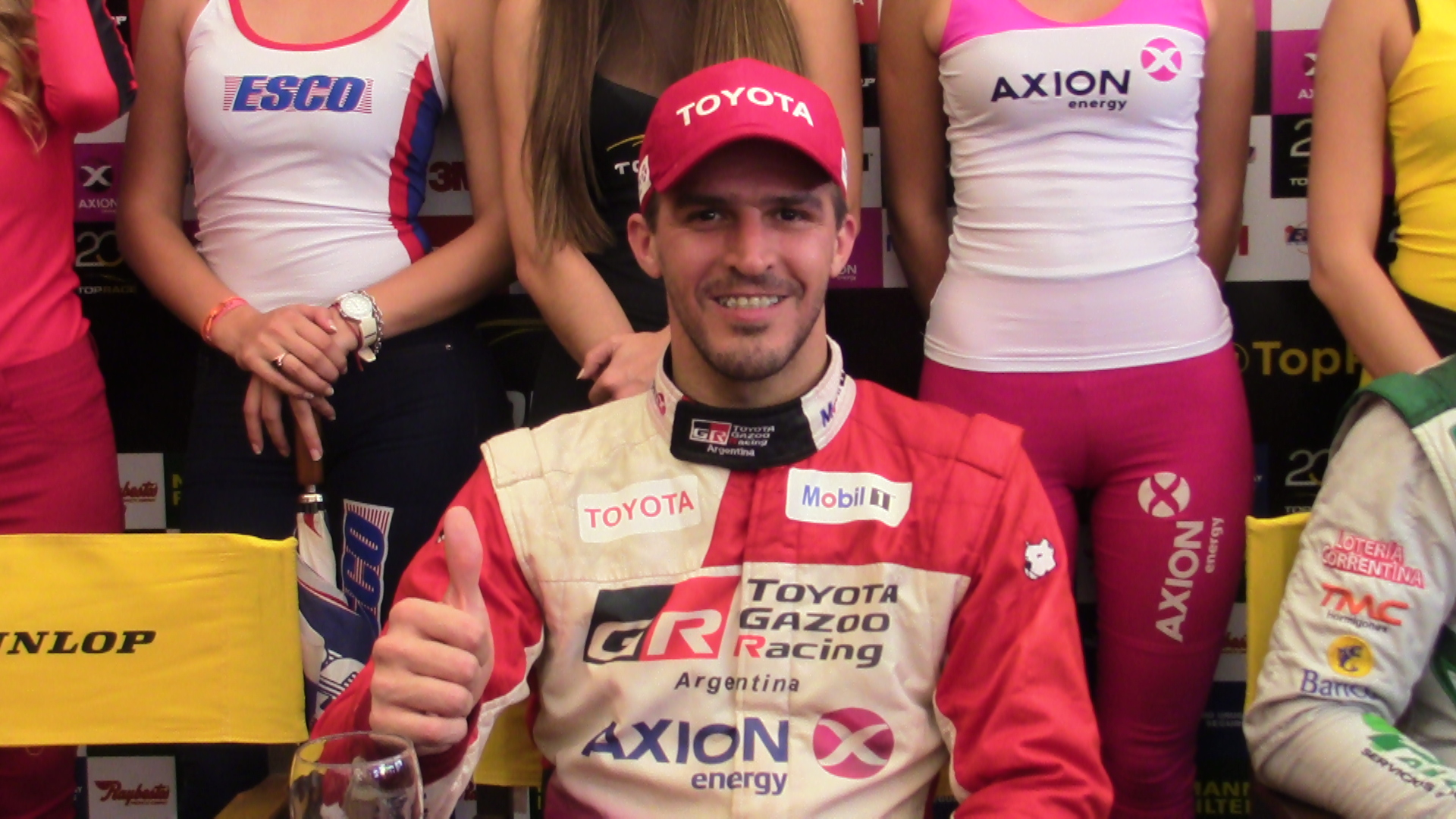
Matías Rossi (pictured in 2017) won his fifth Turismo Competición 2000 championship

The 2020 Súper TC2000 Championship was the 42nd season of Turismo Competición 2000 and the 9th season of Súper TC2000, the premier touring car category of Argentina. It started in September 2020 and finished in February 2021 having been affected by the COVID-19 pandemic in Argentina. Matías Rossi won the championship, his second of the Súper TC2000 era and fifth overall.

== Teams and drivers ==
Entrant (Commercial title)	Car	No.	Driver	Rounds
Monti Motorsport	Chevrolet Cruze	51	(Argentina) José Manuel Urcera	1-10
Monti Motorsport	Chevrolet Cruze	33	(Argentina) José Manuel Sapag	11-12
Ambrogio Racing (Renault Sport Castrol Team)	Renault Fluence	1	(Argentina) Leonel Pernía	All
Ambrogio Racing (Renault Sport Castrol Team)	Renault Fluence	28	(Argentina) Matías Milla	1-2, 4-12
Ambrogio Racing (Renault Sport Castrol Team)	Renault Fluence	30	(Argentina) Tomás Gagliardi Genné	All
Ambrogio Racing (Renault Sport Castrol Team)	Renault Fluence	83	(Argentina) Facundo Ardusso	All
Pro Racing (Chevrolet YPF)	Chevrolet Cruze	2	(Argentina) Bernardo Llaver	All
Pro Racing (Chevrolet YPF)	Chevrolet Cruze	86	(Argentina) Agustín Canapino	All
Toyota Gazoo Racing Argentina (Toyota Gazoo Racing YPF Infinia)	Toyota Corolla	7	(Argentina) Hernán Palazzo	1-2, 9-10
Toyota Gazoo Racing Argentina (Toyota Gazoo Racing YPF Infinia)	Toyota Corolla	11	(Brazil) Rubens Barrichello	All
Toyota Gazoo Racing Argentina (Toyota Gazoo Racing YPF Infinia)	Toyota Corolla	17	(Argentina) Matías Rossi	All
Toyota Gazoo Racing Argentina (Toyota Gazoo Racing YPF Infinia)	Toyota Corolla	57	(Argentina) Franco Vivian	3-7, 11-12
Toyota Gazoo Racing Argentina (Toyota Gazoo Racing YPF Infinia)	Toyota Corolla	68	(Argentina) Julián Santero	1, 3-12
Equipo FDC	Citroën C4 Lounge	22	(Argentina) Juan José Garriz	All
Equipo FDC	Citroën C4 Lounge	24	(Argentina) Matías Cravero	3-5
Equipo FDC	Citroën C4 Lounge	25	(Argentina) Marcelo Ciarrocchi	All
Equipo FDC	Citroën C4 Lounge	33	(Argentina) José Manuel Sapag	1-2, 6-9
RAM Racing Factory (Puma Energy Honda Racing)	Honda Civic	5	(Argentina) Fabián Yannantuoni	All
RAM Racing Factory (Puma Energy Honda Racing)	Honda Civic	9	(Argentina) Nicolás Moscardini	All
RAM Racing Factory (Puma Energy Honda Racing)	Honda Civic	34	(Argentina) Juan Ángel Rosso	All
RAM Racing Factory (Puma Energy Honda Racing)	Honda Civic	35	(Argentina) Diego Ciantini	9-0
RAM Racing Factory (Puma Energy Honda Racing)	Honda Civic	111	(Argentina) Juan Manuel Silva	1-7, 11-12
Fiat Racing Team STC2000	Fiat Cronos	21	(Argentina) Matías Muñoz Marchesi	1-3, 6
Fiat Racing Team STC2000	Fiat Cronos	63	(Argentina) Franco Girolami	1-3, 6-8
Fiat Racing Team STC2000	Fiat Cronos	64	(Argentina) Bruno Armellini	1-3, 6-8
Midas Carrera Team	Toyota Corolla	14	(Argentina) Ricardo Risatti	All
Midas Carrera Team	Toyota Corolla	133	(Argentina) Valentín Aguirre	1-10
Midas Carrera Team	Toyota Corolla	35	(Argentina) Diego Ciantini	11-12
TS Racing	Chevrolet Cruze	67	(Argentina) Nicolás Traut	7
Fineschi Racing	Fiat Cronos	36	(Argentina) Damián Fineschi	11

=== Changes ===
- The two main novelties for the season were the arrival of the private Midas Carrera Team and Monti Motorsport teams. Also, the Citroën subsidiary officially stopped supporting the FDC team.
- Julián Santero missed the second race for positive COVID-19, while Matías Milla didn't participate in the third for the same reason. In both cases, they were not replaced by another driver in those races.
- Hernán Palazzo stopped racing for Toyota Gazoo Racing Argentina in October and was replaced by Franco Vivian. Palazzo returned at ninth race and Vivian at eleventh race.
- Matías Cravero replaced José Manuel Sapag when competed in WTCR and TCR Europe.
- The Fiat Racing Team STC2000 didn't participate in the fourth and fifth races due to several cases of COVID-19 within it.
- Nicolás Traut participated in the seventh race of the year.
- Fiat Racing Team STC2000 did not participate in the 10 and 11 races.
- In race 11, José Manuel Sapag replaced José Manuel Urcera (in Monti Motorsport) and Diego Ciantini replaced Valentín Aguirre (in Midas Carrera Team). Damián Fineschi participated in this race with a Fiat from the Fineschi Racing.

== Calendar ==
Race	Circuit	Date
1	Autódromo Oscar y Juan Gálvez (Layout No. 8), Buenos Aires	September 20 2020
2	Autódromo Oscar y Juan Gálvez (Layout No. 9), Buenos Aires	September 27 2020
3	Autódromo Oscar Cabalén (Layout No. 3), Córdoba	October 25 2020
4	Autódromo Oscar Cabalén, Córdoba	October 31 2020
5	Autódromo Oscar Cabalén, Córdoba	November 1 2020
6	Autódromo Oscar y Juan Gálvez (Layout No. 6), Buenos Aires	November 29 2020
7	Autódromo Oscar y Juan Gálvez (Layout No. 7), Buenos Aires	December 5 2020
8	Autódromo Oscar y Juan Gálvez (Layout No. 7), Buenos Aires	December 6 2020
9	Autódromo Parque Ciudad de Río Cuarto, Río Cuarto	January 10 2021
10	Autódromo Ciudad de Paraná, Paraná	January 17 2021
11	Autódromo Oscar y Juan Gálvez (Layout No. 8), Buenos Aires	February 7 2021
12	Autódromo Oscar y Juan Gálvez (Layout No. 6), Buenos Aires	February 14 2021

== Race calendar and results ==
Race		Pole position	Qualifying race	Fastest lap	Race winner	Team winner	Car winner
1	Buenos Aires 1	(Argentina) Matías Rossi	(Argentina) Matías Rossi	(Argentina) Agustín Canapino	(Argentina) Agustín Canapino	Chevrolet YPF	Chevrolet Cruze
2	Buenos Aires 2	(Argentina) Facundo Ardusso	(Argentina) Leonel Pernía	(Argentina) Matías Rossi	(Argentina) Facundo Ardusso	Renault Sport Castrol Team	Renault Fluence
3	Córdoba 1	(Argentina) Matías Rossi	(Argentina) Bernardo Llaver	(Argentina) Bernardo Llaver	(Argentina) Bernardo Llaver	Chevrolet YPF	Chevrolet Cruze
4	Córdoba 2	(Argentina) José Manuel Urcera	-	(Argentina) José Manuel Urcera	(Argentina) Matías Rossi	Toyota Gazoo Racing YPF Infinia	Toyota Corolla
5	Córdoba 2	(Argentina) Matías Rossi	-	(Argentina) Ricardo Risatti	(Argentina) Matías Rossi	Toyota Gazoo Racing YPF Infinia	Toyota Corolla
6	Buenos Aires 3	(Argentina) Facundo Ardusso	(Brazil) Rubens Barrichello	(Brazil) Rubens Barrichello	(Brazil) Rubens Barrichello	Toyota Gazoo Racing YPF Infinia	Toyota Corolla
7	Buenos Aires 4	(Argentina) Julián Santero	-	(Argentina) Matías Rossi	(Argentina) Matías Rossi	Toyota Gazoo Racing YPF Infinia	Toyota Corolla
8	Buenos Aires 4	(Argentina) Julián Santero	-	(Argentina) Julián Santero	(Argentina) Julián Santero	Toyota Gazoo Racing YPF Infinia	Toyota Corolla
9	Río Cuarto	(Argentina) Julián Santero	(Argentina) Leonel Pernía	(Argentina) Leonel Pernía	(Argentina) Leonel Pernía	Renault Sport Castrol Team	Renault Fluence
10	Paraná	(Argentina) Leonel Pernía	(Argentina) Leonel Pernía	(Argentina) Matías Rossi	(Argentina) Matías Rossi	Toyota Gazoo Racing YPF Infinia	Toyota Corolla
11	Buenos Aires 5	(Argentina) Agustín Canapino	(Argentina) Bernardo Llaver	(Argentina) Leonel Pernía	(Argentina) Agustín Canapino	Chevrolet YPF	Chevrolet Cruze
12	Buenos Aires 6	(Argentina) Julián Santero	-	(Argentina) Agustín Canapino	(Argentina) Agustín Canapino	Chevrolet YPF	Chevrolet Cruze

== Championship standings ==
Pos.	Driver	BUA (Buenos Aires)		BUA (Buenos Aires)		AGR (Córdoba Province, Argentina)		AGR (Córdoba Province, Argentina)		BUA (Buenos Aires)		BUA (Buenos Aires)		RCU (Córdoba Province, Argentina)		PAR (Entre Ríos Province)		BUA (Buenos Aires)		BUA (Buenos Aires)	Points
1	(Argentina) Matías Rossi	1	2	6	2	6	4	1	1	11	16†	1	2	3	2	12	1	5	5	3	167 (192)
2	(Argentina) Agustín Canapino	2	1	7	4	7	6	8	2	12	2	2	4	8	4	DSQ	3	3	1	1	150 (177)
3	(Argentina) Julián Santero	5	3			3	3	2	Ret	5	4	Ret	1	5	9	7	14†	11	6	2	107 (115)
4	(Argentina) Leonel Pernía	6	17†	1	Ret	5	5	3	8	7	12	Ret	15	1	1	1	13†	2	13	4	99 (100)
5	(Argentina) Facundo Ardusso	3	4	8	1	8	7	4	9	16	7	3	16	9	5	8	6	6	2	5	96 (113)
6	(Argentina) Bernardo Llaver	7	6	Ret	Ret	1	1	9	15	6	DSQ	12	Ret	Ret	13	5	Ret	1	3	7	67
7	(Brazil) Rubens Barrichello	18	8	DSQ	8	13	10	17†	11	1	1	6	7	16	Ret	6	5	10	16	6	64
8	(Argentina) Matías Milla	8	16†	2	3			10	Ret	2	DSQ	5	5	17	Ret	13	10	7	4	8	55
9	(Argentina) Ricardo Risatti	10	5	10	Ret	4	2	14†	3	13	9	7	8	7	DSQ	Ret	12†	15	7	14	47 (49)
10	(Argentina) Nicolás Moscardini	4	Ret	5	Ret	19	11	Ret	12	4	3	Ret	6	14	10	4	11	4	10	10	34 (35)
11	(Argentina) Marcelo Ciarrocchi	19	Ret	13	12	11	Ret	12	7	17	18	Ret	Ret	2	3	9	4	19	17	Ret	32
12	(Argentina) Tomás Gagliardi Genné	12	11	9	6	16	15	6	5	9	5	17†	11	11	8	10	7	20	15	12	32
13	(Argentina) Franco Vivian					2	12	5	4	20	8	10	9					9	8	13	29
14	(Argentina) José Manuel Urcera	20	12	11	Ret	20†	13	Ret	Ret	15	15	Ret	Ret	Ret	Ret	2	2				26
15	(Argentina) Fabián Yannantuoni	23†	14	Ret	7	10	8	13	6	10	6	8	12	12	15†	11	9	18	12	9	26
16	(Argentina) Juan Manuel Silva	16	7	4	5	9	9	16	10	Ret	10	11	14					17	18†	11	20
17	(Argentina) Valentín Aguirre	13	15	14	13	Ret	Ret	15	14	8	Ret	4	3	Ret	DSQ	14	Ret				18
18	(Argentina) Franco Girolami	9	Ret	18†	9	15	DSQ			14	Ret	9	10	4	6						14
19	(Argentina) Juan Ángel Rosso	11	Ret	3	Ret	12	16	7	16	3	Ret	13	13	13	11	17	Ret	13	11	17	12
20	(Argentina) Diego Ciantini													6	7	3	Ret	14	9	16	11
21	(Argentina) Juan José Garriz	15	13	17	10	17	18	11	13	18	17	14	Ret	Ret	12	15	8	16	14	15	4
22	(Argentina) Matías Muñoz Marchesi	14	9	12	Ret	14	19†			19	11										2
23	(Argentina) Bruno Armellini	21	10	16	14†	Ret	17			Ret	13	15	17	15	14						1
-	(Argentina) José Manuel Sapag	22	Ret	15	11					21	14	16†	Ret	Ret	Ret			8	Ret	18†	0
-	(Argentina) Matías Cravero					18	14	Ret	17												0
-	(Argentina) José Hernán Palazzo	17	DSQ	Ret	Ret									17	Ret	16	Ret				0
-	(Argentina) Nicolás Traut											Ret	Ret								0
Drivers ineligible for championship points
-	(Argentina) Damián Fineschi																	12	Ret		0

=== Teams' championship ===
Pos	Team	Points
1	Toyota Gazoo Racing YPF Infinia	334
2	Renault Sport Castrol Team	259
3	Chevrolet YPF	217
4	Puma Energy Honda Racing	95
5	Midas Carrera Team	67
6	FDC	36
7	Monti Motorsport	26
8	Fiat Racing Team STC2000	17
NC	TS Racing	0
NC	Fineschi Racing	0

=== Manufacturers' championship ===
Pos	Manufacturer	Points
1	Toyota	285
2	Chevrolet	217
3	Renault	195
4	Citroën	36
5	Honda	32
6	Fiat	16
