= José Manuel Sapag =

Argentine racing driver

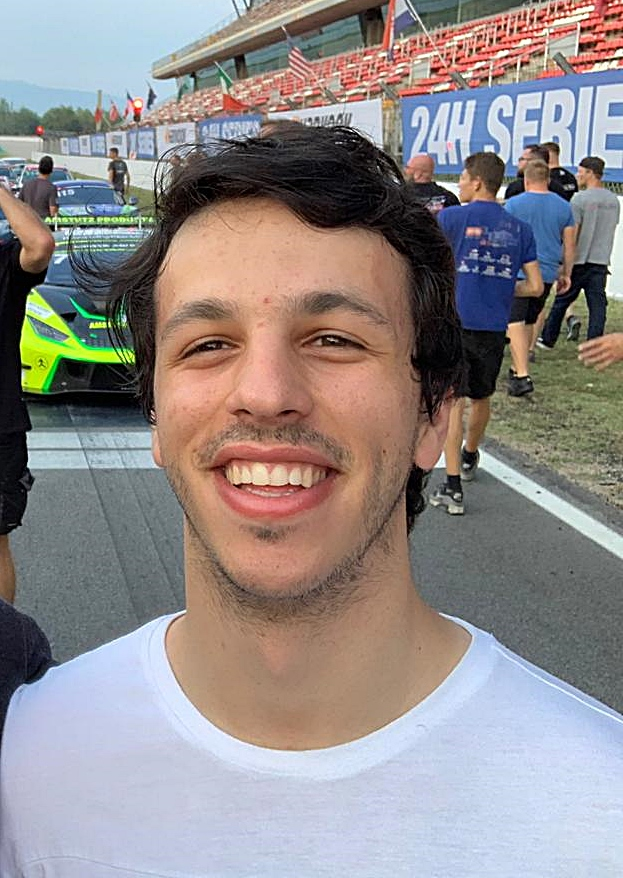
Manu Sapag in 2019.

José Manuel "Manu" Sapag (born September 28, 1995, in Buenos Aires) is an Argentine motor racing driver.

== Racing career ==
Sapag began his career in 2014 in the Fórmula Metropolitana, and the next year, he reached a podium. In 2016, he made his debut in TC 2000 and returned to compete in the Fórmula Metropolitana, where he won for the first time.

In 2017, Sapag participated in competitions of several championships, highlighting his participation in the TC 2000 season and his victory on the fifth round. He repeated participation in the next season, achieving a victory again.

Sapag made his debut in the Súper TC 2000 as the guest of Federico Iribarne in the 200 km de Buenos Aires 2018. That same year, he made his international debut in TCR Europe Touring Car Series and 24H TCE Series. He besides race the Top Race Series season.

In 2019, Sapag was invited again for the 200 km de Buenos Aires, this time by Marcelo Ciarrocchi, and also raced as a starting driver on the last two races, always for the Citroën Total Racing team. He finished seventh in the championship TC 2000 with two wins.

The next year, Sapag became a Súper TC 2000 driver with Equipo FDC and Monti Motorsport. Outside his country, he raced in the TCR Europe and World Touring Car Cup with Target Competition, in the latter as a guest driver for two rounds.

In 2021, Sapag did not return to Europe. He remained in the Argentine Super TC 2000 and Top Race V6 championships. In the Super TC 2000, he raced with the Honda factory team but scored only one point, while in the Top Race V6 he managed to win a sprint race. Besides, Sapag obtained a pole position and four podiums in the inaugural season of TCR South America. The following year, he finished fourth in TCR South America with one victory.

== Racing record ==
=== Racing career summary ===
Season	Series	Team	Races	Wins	Poles	F/Laps	Podiums	Points	Position
2014	Fórmula Metropolitana	CB Sport	3	0	0	0	0	2	31st
2015	Fórmula Metropolitana	CB Racing	13	0	1	0	1	59	9th
2016	TC2000	PSG-16 Team	9	0	0	0	0	25.5	27th
2016	Fórmula 4 Nueva Generación	Becerra Racing	3	0	0	0	0	25.5	22nd
2016	Fórmula Metropolitana	CB Racing	29	1	0	1	7	197.5	7th
2017	Top Race Series	JLS Motorsport	2	0	0	0	0	1	30th
2017	Top Race Junior	-	2	0	0	0	0	9	26th
2017	TC2000	PSG16 Team	20	1	1	0	2	88	15th
2017	Fórmula Renault 2.0 Argentina	Litoral Group	12	0	0	0	3	191	12th
2017	Fórmula Renault Plus	Aimar Motorsport	1	0	0	0	0	12	42nd
2018	Súper TC2000	Citroën Total Racing	1	0	0	0	0	-	
2018	TCR Europe Touring Car Series	Baporo Motorsport	2	0	0	0	0	0	31st
2018	24H TCE Series - TCR	Baporo Motorsport	1	0	0	0	0	?	?
2018	Fiat Competizione	-	1	0	0	0	0	18	27th
2018	TC2000	Citroën Total Racing Team PSG	14	1	0	1	3	275	6th
2018	Top Race Series	Pfening Competición	12	1	0	0	1	76	7th
2019	24H TCE Series - TCR	Baporo Motorsport	1	0	0	0	1	?	?
2019	Súper TC2000	Citroën Total Racing	3	0	0	0	0	-	
2019	Top Race V6	MS Sportteam	12	0	0	0	0	11	14th
2019	TC2000	Citroën Total Racing Team PSG	12	2	2	2	4	194	7th
2020	Súper TC2000	FDC; Monti Motorsport	13	0	0	0	0	0	NC
2020	Top Race V6	Lincoln Motorsport	1	0	0	0	0	6	16th
2020	World Touring Car Cup	Target Competition	6	0	0	0	0	-	
2020	TCR Europe Touring Car Series	Target Competition	6	0	0	0	0	36	20th
2020	TCR Ibérico	Target Competition	4	0	0	0	0	0	20th
2021	Súper TC2000	Puma Energy Honda Racing	22	0	0	0	0	1	19th
2021	Top Race V6	Lincoln Motorsport	14	1	0	0	4	99	8th
2021	TCR South America Touring Car Championship	Squadra Martino	10	0	1	0	4	138	4th
2022	Top Race V6	Lincoln Motorsport	20	0	0	0	1	103	10th
2022	TCR South America Touring Car Championship	PMO Motorsport	12	1	1	1	3	346	4th
2023	Top Race V6	Toyota Gazoo Racing Argentina	18	0	0	0	4	128	6th
2023	TCR South America Touring Car Championship	Toyota Team Argentina	18	0	0	0	2	212	10th
2023	TCR World Tour	Toyota Team Argentina	4	0	0	0	0	5	46th

== Racing record ==
=== Complete TCR Europe Touring Car Series results ===
(key) (Races in bold indicate pole position) (Races in italics indicate fastest lap)

Year	Team	Car	1	2	3	4	5	6	7	8	9	10	11	12	13	14	DC	Points
2018	Baporo Motorsport	CUPRA León TCR	LEC; 1	LEC; 2	ZAN; 1	ZAN; 2	SPA; 1	SPA; 2	HUN; 1	HUN; 2	ASS; 1	ASS; 2	MNZ; 1 Ret	MNZ; 2; 11	CAT; 1	CAT; 2	31st	0
2020	Target Competition	Hyundai i30 N TCR	LEC; 1	LEC; 2	ZOL; 1	ZOL; 2	MNZ; 1	MNZ; 2	CAT; 1; 12	CAT; 2; 8	SPA; 1; 13^{7}	SPA; 2 Ret	JAR; 1; 18	JAR; 2; 13			20th	36

=== Complete World Touring Car Cup results ===
(key) (Races in bold indicate pole position) (Races in italics indicate fastest lap)

Year	Team	Car	1	2	3	4	5	6	7	8	9	10	11	12	13	14	15	16	DC	Points
2020	Target Competition	Hyundai i30 N TCR	BEL; 1	BEL; 2	GER; 1	GER; 2	SVK; 1	SVK; 2	SVK; 3	HUN; 1; 20	HUN; 2; 15	HUN; 3; 18	ESP; 1	ESP; 2	ESP; 3	ARA; 1; 19	ARA; 2 Ret	ARA; 3 DNS	NC‡	0‡

^{‡} As Sapag was a Wildcard entry, he was ineligible to score points.
