= Autódromo Municipal Juan Manuel Fangio =

Racing circuit in Rosario, Argentina

- Intermediate Circuit (1993–2018)
- Location: Rosario, Santa Fe, Argentina
- Coordinates: 32°54′11.16″S 60°44′43.44″W
- Capacity: 40,000
- Opened: 21 December 1981; 44 years ago Re-opened: 2012
- Closed: 2009
- Major events: Current: TCR South America (2023–present); Turismo Carretera (2019, 2026); TC Pick Up (2026); Turismo Nacional (1993–1996, 2017–2019, 2021–2022, 2024–present); TC Mouras (2026); Former: FIA World RX; World RX of Argentina (2015–2016); TC2000 (1993–1996, 2012–2019, 2021–2025); Top Race V6 (1997, 2001–2002, 2004, 2012–2017, 2022–2025); SASTC (1997–2000)

Full Circuit (2019–present)
- Length: 3.910 km (2.430 mi)
- Turns: 17
- Race lap record: 1:37.808 ( (Uruguay) Mauricio Lambiris, Ford Mustang Mach 1, 2026, TC)

Extended Circuit (2018–present)
- Length: 3.040 km (1.889 mi)
- Turns: 12
- Race lap record: 1:19.622 ( (Argentina) Marcelo Ciarrocchi, Citroën C4 II, 2018, TC2000)

Intermediate Circuit (1993–2018)
- Length: 2.595 km (1.612 mi)
- Turns: 9
- Race lap record: 0:59.818 ( (Argentina) Facundo Ardusso, Renault Fluence, 2017, Súper TC2000)

Original Circuit (1982–2018)
- Length: 1.360 km (0.845 mi)
- Turns: 5

The Autódromo Municipal Juan Manuel Fangio is a 3.910 km (2.430 mi) motor sports racing circuit located in Rosario in the Santa Fe Province of Argentina. The circuit is named after five-time Formula One champion, Juan Manuel Fangio (1911–1995).

It has hosted national touring car races such as the Turismo Carretera, TC2000 and Top Race V6, as well as the World RX of Argentina in 2015 and 2016.

== Events ==
Current

- April: Turismo Nacional
- June: Turismo Pista, Turismo Carretera 2000
- August: TC Pick Up, TC Pista Pick Up
- September: TC Mouras, TC Pista Mouras
- October: Turismo Carretera, Turismo Carretera Pista, Fórmula 2 Argentina
- November: TCR South America Touring Car Championship

Former

- FIA World Rallycross Championship
  - World RX of Argentina (2015–2016)
- Formula Renault 2.0 Argentina (2012–2014, 2017–2019)
- South American Super Touring Car Championship (1997–2000)
- TC2000 Championship (1993–1996, 2012–2019, 2021–2025)
- Top Race V6 (1997, 2001–2002, 2004, 2012–2017, 2022–2025)

== Lap records ==
As of November 2026, the fastest official race lap records at the Autódromo Municipal Juan Manuel Fangio are listed as:

Category	Time	Driver	Vehicle	Event
Full Circuit (2019–present): 3.910 km (2.430 mi)
Turismo Carretera	1:37.808	Mauricio Lambiris	Ford Mustang Mach 1	2026 Rosario Turismo Carretera round
TC2000	1:38.100	Matías Rossi	Toyota Corolla Cross	2025 Rosario TC2000 round
TCR Touring Car	1:38.400	Néstor Girolami	Hyundai Elantra N TCR (2024)	2026 Rosario TCR South America round
Formula Renault 2.0	1:39.648	Tobías Martínez	Tito F4-A	2019 Rosario Formula Renault 2.0 Argentina round
TC Mouras	1:41.251	Valentino Alaux	Dodge Cherokee	2026 Rosario TC Mouras round
Top Race V6	1:41.864	Facundo Aldrighetti	Lexus ES XV60	2023 Rosario Top Race V6 round
TC Pick Up	1:42.080	José Hernán Palazzo	Toyota Hilux VIII	2026 Rosario TC Pick Up round
Extended Circuit (2018–present): 3.040 km (1.889 mi)
TC2000	1:19.622	Marcelo Ciarrocchi	Citroën C4 II	2018 Rosario TC2000 round
Intermediate Circuit (1993–2018): 2.595 km (1.612 mi)
Súper TC2000	0:59.818	Facundo Ardusso	Renault Fluence	2017 Rosario Súper TC2000 round
Formula Renault 2.0	1:00.631	Felipe Schmauk	Tito F4-A	2014 Rosario Formula Renault Argentina round
Super Touring	1:07.752	Alejandro Pagani	Chevrolet Vectra 16v	1997 Rosario SASTC round
