= 2021 Súper TC2000 =

Motorsport in Argentina

Seasons
- ← 2020 2022 →

The 2021 Súper TC2000 Championship was the 43rd season of Turismo Competición 2000 and the 10th season of Súper TC2000. The series commenced on March 13 at the Autódromo Oscar y Juan Gálvez and concluded on November 28 at the same circuit, after 12 rounds.

== Teams and drivers ==
Entrant (Commercial title)	Car	#	Driver	Rounds	Co-driver (200 km)
Toyota Gazoo Racing Argentina (Toyota Gazoo Racing YPF Infinia)	Toyota Corolla Mk.12	1	(Argentina) Matías Rossi	1, 3-12	(Argentina) José María López
Toyota Gazoo Racing Argentina (Toyota Gazoo Racing YPF Infinia)	Toyota Corolla Mk.12	9	(Argentina) Nicolás Moscardini	2	—N/a
Toyota Gazoo Racing Argentina (Toyota Gazoo Racing YPF Infinia)	Toyota Corolla Mk.12	16	(Argentina) Emiliano Spataro	3-9	(Argentina) Matías Rodríguez
Toyota Gazoo Racing Argentina (Toyota Gazoo Racing YPF Infinia)	Toyota Corolla Mk.12	57	(Argentina) Franco Vivian	1-3, 5-12	(Argentina) José Hernán Palazzo
Toyota Gazoo Racing Argentina (Toyota Gazoo Racing YPF Infinia)	Toyota Corolla Mk.12	68	(Argentina) Julián Santero	All	(France) Sacha Fenestraz
Toyota Gazoo Racing Argentina (Toyota Gazoo Racing YPF Infinia)	Toyota Corolla Mk.12	111	(Brazil) Rubens Barrichello	1-2, 10-12	—N/a
Pro Racing (Chevrolet YPF)	Chevrolet Cruze Mk.2	2	(Argentina) Bernardo Llaver	All	(Argentina) Carlos Javier Merlo
Pro Racing (Chevrolet YPF)	Chevrolet Cruze Mk.2	30	(Argentina) Tomás Gagliardi Genné	1-4, 6	—N/a
Pro Racing (Chevrolet YPF)	Chevrolet Cruze Mk.2	85	(Argentina) Ricardo Risatti	5	—N/a
Pro Racing (Chevrolet YPF)	Chevrolet Cruze Mk.2	86	(Argentina) Agustín Canapino	All	(Argentina) Ricardo Risatti
Ambrogio Racing (Renault Castrol Team)	Renault Fluence	3	(Argentina) Leonel Pernía	All	(Argentina) Antonino García
Ambrogio Racing (Renault Castrol Team)	Renault Fluence	8	(Argentina) Matías Milla	All	(Argentina) Jorge Barrio
Ambrogio Racing (Renault Castrol Team)	Renault Fluence	36	(Argentina) Damián Fineschi	All	(Argentina) Diego Ciantini
Ambrogio Racing (Renault Castrol Team)	Renault Fluence	97	(Argentina) Tomás Cingolani	All	(Argentina) Luis José di Palma
RAM Racing Factory (Puma Energy Honda Racing)	Honda Civic Mk.10	5	(Argentina) Fabián Yannantuoni	All	(Argentina) Matías Muñoz Marchesi
RAM Racing Factory (Puma Energy Honda Racing)	Honda Civic Mk.10	23	(Argentina) Ignacio Montenegro	11-12	—N/a
RAM Racing Factory (Puma Energy Honda Racing)	Honda Civic Mk.10	33	(Argentina) José Manuel Sapag	1-10	(Uruguay) Mauricio Lambiris
RAM Racing Factory (Puma Energy Honda Racing)	Honda Civic Mk.10	34	(Argentina) Juan Ángel Rosso	All	(Argentina) Facundo Marques
RAM Racing Factory (Puma Energy Honda Racing)	Honda Civic Mk.10	83	(Argentina) Facundo Ardusso	All	(Argentina) Gabriel Ponce de León
Pfening Competición (TGR Junior Team)	Toyota Corolla Mk.12	9	(Argentina) Nicolás Moscardini	3-12	(Argentina) Emmanuel Cáceres
Pfening Competición (TGR Junior Team)	Toyota Corolla Mk.12	100	(Argentina) Ian Reutemann	3-12	(Argentina) Ignacio Montenegro
Equipo FDC	Citroën C4 Mk.2	14	(Argentina) Matías Cravero	5-9	(Argentina) Javier Scuncio Moro
Equipo FDC	Citroën C4 Mk.2	22	(Argentina) Juan José Garriz	All	(Argentina) Manuel Luque
Equipo FDC	Citroën C4 Mk.2	25	(Argentina) Marcelo Ciarrocchi	All	(Argentina) Facundo Chapur
JM Motorsport	Honda Civic Mk.10	45	(Argentina) Ayrton Chorne	8-10	(Argentina) Mateo Polakovich
JM Motorsport	Chevrolet Cruze Mk.2	67	(Argentina) Nicolás Traut	12	—N/a
TS Racing	Chevrolet Cruze Mk.2	67	(Argentina) Nicolás Traut	6-8	(Argentina) Milton Bobel

== Race calendar and results ==
=== Overview ===
Round	Circuit	Date	Pole position	Fastest lap	Race winner	Winning team	Winning car
1	Autódromo Oscar y Juan Gálvez (Layout No. 8), Buenos Aires	March 13	(Argentina) Leonel Pernía	(Argentina) Matías Rossi	(Argentina) Matías Rossi	Toyota Gazoo Racing Argentina	Toyota Corolla Mk.12
1	Autódromo Oscar y Juan Gálvez (Layout No. 8), Buenos Aires	March 14		(Argentina) Leonel Pernía	(Argentina) Leonel Pernía	Ambrogio Racing	Renault Fluence
2	Autódromo Oscar y Juan Gálvez (Layout No. 9), Buenos Aires	March 20	(Argentina) Agustín Canapino	(Argentina) Agustín Canapino	(Argentina) Agustín Canapino	Pro Racing	Chevrolet Cruze Mk.2
2	Autódromo Oscar y Juan Gálvez (Layout No. 9), Buenos Aires	March 21		(Argentina) Julián Santero	(Argentina) Agustín Canapino	Pro Racing	Chevrolet Cruze Mk.2
3	(Córdoba Province, Argentina) Autódromo Oscar Cabalén, Alta Gracia	April 10	(Argentina) Leonel Pernía	(Argentina) Facundo Ardusso	(Argentina) Franco Vivian	Toyota Gazoo Racing Argentina	Toyota Corolla Mk.12
3	(Córdoba Province, Argentina) Autódromo Oscar Cabalén, Alta Gracia	April 11		(Argentina) Matías Rossi	(Argentina) Matías Rossi	Toyota Gazoo Racing Argentina	Toyota Corolla Mk.12
4	(Buenos Aires Province) Autódromo Juan María Traverso, San Nicolás de los Arroyos	May 1	(Argentina) Facundo Ardusso	(Argentina) Facundo Ardusso	(Argentina) Facundo Ardusso	RAM Racing Factory	Honda Civic Mk.10
4	(Buenos Aires Province) Autódromo Juan María Traverso, San Nicolás de los Arroyos	May 2		(Argentina) Matías Rossi	(Argentina) Facundo Ardusso	RAM Racing Factory	Honda Civic Mk.10
5	Autódromo Oscar y Juan Gálvez (Layout No. 9), Buenos Aires	June 9	(Argentina) Damián Fineschi	(Argentina) Damián Fineschi	(Argentina) Damián Fineschi	Ambrogio Racing	Renault Fluence
5	Autódromo Oscar y Juan Gálvez (Layout No. 9), Buenos Aires	June 10		(Argentina) Matías Rossi	(Argentina) Damián Fineschi	Ambrogio Racing	Renault Fluence
6	(Entre Ríos Province) Autódromo Ciudad de Paraná, Paraná	July 17	(Argentina) Julián Santero	(Argentina) Matías Rossi	(Argentina) Julián Santero	Toyota Gazoo Racing Argentina	Toyota Corolla Mk.12
6	(Entre Ríos Province) Autódromo Ciudad de Paraná, Paraná	July 18		(Argentina) Matías Rossi	(Argentina) Facundo Ardusso	RAM Racing Factory	Honda Civic Mk.10
7	(La Pampa Province) Autódromo Provincia de La Pampa, Toay	August 14	(Argentina) Leonel Pernía	(Argentina) Agustín Canapino	(Argentina) Leonel Pernía	Ambrogio Racing	Renault Fluence
7	(La Pampa Province) Autódromo Provincia de La Pampa, Toay	August 15		(Argentina) Matías Rossi	(Argentina) Matías Rossi	Toyota Gazoo Racing Argentina	Toyota Corolla Mk.12
8	Autódromo Oscar y Juan Gálvez (Layout No. 9), Buenos Aires	September 5	(Argentina) Leonel Pernía	(Argentina) Leonel Pernía	(Argentina) Leonel Pernía (Argentina) Antonino García	Ambrogio Racing	Renault Fluence
9	(San Juan Province, Argentina) Circuito San Juan Villicum, San Juan	September 25	(Argentina) Agustín Canapino	(Argentina) Agustín Canapino	(Argentina) Franco Vivian (Note: Rossi, Canapino, Llaver, Santero and Fineschi received penalties for exceeding the speed allowed at the rolling start, elevating Vivian from fifth to first.)	Toyota Gazoo Racing Argentina	Toyota Corolla Mk.12
9	(San Juan Province, Argentina) Circuito San Juan Villicum, San Juan	September 26		(Argentina) Agustín Canapino	(Argentina) Agustín Canapino	Pro Racing	Chevrolet Cruze Mk.2
10	(Santa Fe Province) Autódromo Municipal Juan Manuel Fangio, Rosario	October 9	(Argentina) Leonel Pernía	(Argentina) Agustín Canapino	(Argentina) Nicolás Moscardini	Pfening Competición	Toyota Corolla Mk.12
10	(Santa Fe Province) Autódromo Municipal Juan Manuel Fangio, Rosario	October 10		(Argentina) Agustín Canapino	(Argentina) Agustín Canapino	Pro Racing	Chevrolet Cruze Mk.2
11	(Córdoba Province, Argentina) Autódromo Oscar Cabalén, Alta Gracia	November 6	(Argentina) Bernardo Llaver	(Argentina) Bernardo Llaver	(Brazil) Rubens Barrichello	Toyota Gazoo Racing Argentina	Toyota Corolla Mk.12
11	(Córdoba Province, Argentina) Autódromo Oscar Cabalén, Alta Gracia	November 7		(Brazil) Rubens Barrichello	(Argentina) Bernardo Llaver	Pro Racing	Chevrolet Cruze Mk.2
12	(Buenos Aires) Autódromo Oscar y Juan Gálvez (Layout No. 9), Buenos Aires	November 28	(Argentina) Agustín Canapino	(Argentina) Bernardo Llaver	(Argentina) Julián Santero	Toyota Gazoo Racing Argentina	Toyota Corolla Mk.12

=== Championship standings ===
Points system

Pos.	1st	2nd	3rd	4th	5th	6th	7th	8th	9th	10th
Qualifying	3	2	1							
Race	20	15	12	10	8	6	4	3	2	1

Drivers' championship

Pos.	Driver	BUA (Buenos Aires)		BUA (Buenos Aires)		AGA (Córdoba Province, Argentina)		SNI (Buenos Aires Province)		BUA (Buenos Aires)		PAR (Entre Ríos Province)		TOA (La Pampa Province)		BUA (Buenos Aires)	VIL (San Juan Province, Argentina)		ROS (Santa Fe Province)		AGA (Córdoba Province, Argentina)		BUA (Buenos Aires)	Points
1	(Argentina) Agustín Canapino	16	11	1	1	4	7	14	6	4	2	2	5	2	3	2	3	1	2	1	4	4	3	221 (228)
2	(Argentina) Leonel Pernía	2	1	9	4	11	4	7	3	17	15	12	4	1	2	1	6	3	4	4	6	2	2	213 (224)
3	(Argentina) Julián Santero	3	3	4	3	17	8	5	5	7	4	1	2	7	4	8	5	2	6	2	11	6	1	169 (175)
4	(Argentina) Facundo Ardusso	8	8	3	2	3	6	1	1	18	6	6	1	6	7	Ret	2	8	3	17†	9	3	5	144 (147)
5	(Argentina) Matías Rossi	1	2			6	1	6	2	8	5	5	3	5	1	17†	18	NL	7	3	8	9	7	133
6	(Argentina) Bernardo Llaver	15	10	2	5	9	3	4	4	10	7	7	6	9	6	5	4	4	5	8	5	1	8	115 (120)
7	(Argentina) Damián Fineschi	4	4	7	6	15	9	13	8	1	1	11	9	18	10	10	10	12	Ret	6	16	Ret	4	94
8	(Argentina) Matías Milla	9	6	6	7	2	12	2	7	9	NL	3	Ret	3	9	3	11	7	12	12	7	7	6	85
9	(Argentina) Franco Vivian	6	7	Ret	10	1	2			Ret	11	Ret	8	10	5	9	1	10	17†	9	2	Ret	13	59
10	(Argentina) Juan Ángel Rosso	13	14	14	15	5	17†	9	12	2	3	14	10	12	Ret	4	13	14	Ret	14	14	10	11	45
11	(Argentina) Fabián Yannantuoni	11	16	8	9	7	Ret	Ex.	13	3	Ret	4	13	4	8	Ret	19†	9	8	5	10	5	17	33
12	(Argentina) Nicolás Moscardini			15	12	Ret	16†	Ret	10	19	14	10	Ret	8	Ret	14	7	5	1	7	3	Ex.	15	25
13	(Argentina) Emiliano Spataro					8	5	3	9	6	8	Ret	12	14	11	13	12	6						24
14	(Brazil) Rubens Barrichello	5	5	12	11														9	11	1	11	12	18
15	(Argentina) Tomás Cingolani	14	13	14	Ret	14	10	8	11	12	9	8	7	19	Ret	6	14	18	11	10	12	13	19†	18
16	(Argentina) Marcelo Ciarrocchi	7	12	13	8	10	Ret	12	17†	5	Ret	NL	Ret	11	Ret	7	8	13	13	13	13	8	10	17
17	(Argentina) Juan José Garriz	10	9	Ret	13	12	15†	11	16	14	12	5	11	15	12	Ret	15	11	15	16	16	Ret	14	4
18	(Argentina) Tomás Gagliardi Genné	12	15	5	16	16	11	Ret	15			13	15											2
19	(Argentina) José Manuel Sapag	Ret	17†	11	14	13	13	10	14	11	10	15	17†	17	13	12	20†	16	14	15				1
NC	(Argentina) Ian Reutemann					18	14	Ret	Ret	15	13	16	14	16	14	11	9	15	10	Ret	15	12	16	0
NC	(Argentina) Matías Cravero									16	17†	Ret	16	13	15	15	17	19						0
NC	(Argentina) Nicolás Traut											Ret	Ret	Ret	16	Ret							18	0
NC	(Argentina) Ricardo Risatti III									13	16					2^{1}								0
NC	(Argentina) Ayrton Chorne															16	16	17	16	18†				0
Guest drivers ineligible for points
	(Argentina) Antonino García															1								
	(Argentina) Jorge Barrio															3								
	(Argentina) Facundo Marques															4								
	(Argentina) Carlos Javier Merlo															5								
	(Argentina) Luis José di Palma															6								
	(Argentina) Facundo Chapur															7								
	(France) Sacha Fenestraz															8								
	(Argentina) Ignacio Montenegro															11					Ret	14	9	
	(Argentina) José Hernán Palazzo															9								
	(Argentina) Diego Ciantini															10								
	(Uruguay) Mauricio Lambiris															12								
	(Argentina) Matías Rodríguez															13								
	(Argentina) Emmanuel Cáceres															14								
	(Argentina) Javier Scuncio Moro															15								
	(Argentina) Mateo Polakovich															16								
	(Argentina) José María López															17†								
	(Argentina) Matías Muñoz Marchesi															Ret								
	(Argentina) Gabriel Ponce de León															Ret								
	(Argentina) Manuel Luque															Ret								
	(Argentina) Milton Bobel															Ret								
Pos.	Driver	BUA (Buenos Aires)		BUA (Buenos Aires)		AGA (Córdoba Province, Argentina)		SNI (Buenos Aires Province)		BUA (Buenos Aires)		PAR (Entre Ríos Province)		TOA (La Pampa Province)		BUA (Buenos Aires)	VIL (San Juan Province, Argentina)		ROS (Santa Fe Province)		AGA (Córdoba Province, Argentina)		BUA (Buenos Aires)	Points

- ^1 – Driver who competed for championship points outside the Buenos Aires 200km but was the designated co-driver for the aforementioned event and was therefore ineligible for points in it.
