= San Luis Circuit =

San Luis Circuit may refer to:

- Autódromo Rosendo Hernández, a permanent race circuit in San Luis Province, Argentina
- Potrero de los Funes Circuit, a semi-permanent race circuit in San Luis Province, Argentina
