= Autódromo Ciudad de Mar del Plata =

- Full Circuit (1983–present)
- Location: Mar del Plata, Buenos Aires, Argentina
- Coordinates: 37°59′39.9″S 57°38′19″W
- Opened: 20 March 1983; 43 years ago
- Major events: Former: TC2000 (1988–1992, 1998–1999, 2002–2004); Turismo Nacional (1985–1986, 1988–1989, 1991, 1999–2000, 2003–2005); Top Race V6 (1998–1999, 2002–2004); SASTC (1999–2000)

Full Circuit (1983–present)
- Length: 2.730 km (1.696 mi)
- Turns: 12
- Race lap record: 1:05.878 ( (Argentina) Juan Manuel Silva, Honda Civic VI, 1999, TC2000)

Short Circuit (1983–present)
- Length: 1.600 km (0.994 mi)
- Turns: 6

Autódromo Ciudad de Mar del Plata is a 2.730 km (1.696 mi) motorsports circuit located in Buenos Aires, Argentina. The circuit was opened in March 1983.

== Lap records ==
As of November 2000, the fastest official race lap records at the Autódromo Ciudad de Mar del Plata are listed as:

Category	Time	Driver	Vehicle	Event
Full Circuit (1983–present): 2.730 km (1.696 mi)
TC2000	1:05.878	Juan Manuel Silva	Honda Civic VI	1999 Mar del Plata TC2000 round
Super Touring	1:09.207	Oscar Larrauri	Alfa Romeo 156 D2	2000 2nd Mar del Plata SASTC round
