= Autódromo General San Martín =

Motorsports circuit

- Long Circuit (2006–present)
- Location: Comodoro Rivadavia, Chubut, Argentina
- Coordinates: 45°54′9.4″S 67°32′43.3″W
- Broke ground: 1966
- Opened: 14 December 1969; 56 years ago
- Major events: Former: Turismo Carretera (1969, 2004–2007, 2013, 2015, 2017, 2022); TC2000 (1991, 2006–2007); Turismo Nacional (1975, 2004, 2023); TC Pick Up (2023); Top Race V6 (2005, 2008–2012, 2014)

Long Circuit (2006–present)
- Length: 4.170 km (2.591 mi)
- Turns: 15

Circuit No 1 (1969–present)
- Length: 3.764 km (2.339 mi)
- Turns: 13
- Race lap record: 1:15.269 ( (Argentina) Agustín Canapino, Chevrolet Chevy, 2022, TC)

Circuit No 2 (1969–present)
- Length: 3.100 km (1.926 mi)
- Turns: 10

Automóvil Club Comodorio Rivadavia is a 4.170 km (2.591 mi) motorsports circuit located in Comodoro Rivadavia, Patagonian, Argentina. It has hosted events in the TC2000 series, Top Race V6 and Turismo Carretera.

== Lap records ==
As of October 2023, the fastest official race lap records at the Autódromo General San Martín (Comodoro Rivadavia) are listed as:

Category	Time	Driver	Vehicle	Event
Circuit No 1 (1969–present): 3.764 km (2.339 mi)
Turismo Carretera	1:15.269	Agustín Canapino	Chevrolet Chevy	2022 Comodoro Rivadavia Turismo Carretera round
TC2000	1:16.230	Christian Ledesma	Chevrolet Astra II	2006 Comodoro Rivadavia TC2000 round
TC Pick Up	1:18.700	Mariano Werner	Toyota Hilux VIII	2023 Comodoro Rivadavia TC Pick Up round
Turismo Nacional Clase 2	1:22.678	Renzo Blotta	Toyota Etios	2023 Comodoro Rivadavia Turismo Nacional round
