= World RX of Argentina =

The World RX of Argentina was a Rallycross event held in Argentina for the FIA World Rallycross Championship. The event made its debut in the 2014 season, at the Circuito Rosendo Hernández in the town of San Luis. The event moved to Autódromo Municipal Juan Manuel Fangio in Rosario, Santa Fe for 2015.

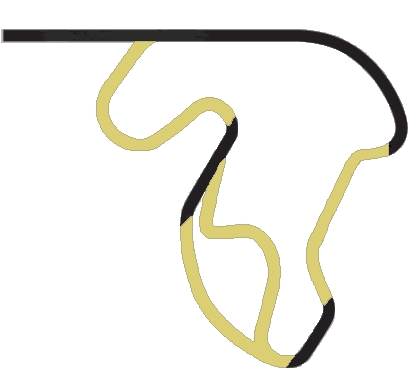
World RX layout of Autódromo Municipal Juan Manuel Fangio which held the event in 2015–2016

== Past winners ==
Year	Host venue	Heat 1 winner	Heat 2 winner	Heat 3 winner	Heat 4 winner	Semi-Final 1 winner	Semi-Final 2 winner	Final winner
2014	San Luis	(Norway) Petter Solberg	(Latvia) Reinis Nitišs	(Finland) Toomas Heikkinen	(Norway) Petter Solberg	(Norway) Petter Solberg	(Latvia) Reinis Nitišs	(Norway) Petter Solberg
2015	Rosario	(Norway) Andreas Bakkerud	(Sweden) Timmy Hansen	(Sweden) Timmy Hansen	Cancelled	(Sweden) Robin Larsson	(Sweden) Timmy Hansen	(Sweden) Robin Larsson
Year	Host venue	Heat 1 winner	Heat 2 winner	Heat 3 winner	Heat 4 winner	Semi-Final 1 winner	Semi-Final 2 winner	Final winner
2016	Rosario	(Norway) Petter Solberg	(Norway) Petter Solberg	(Norway) Petter Solberg	(Norway) Petter Solberg	(Sweden) Johan Kristoffersson	(Norway) Andreas Bakkerud	(Norway) Andreas Bakkerud
