= Autódromo Las Paredes =

Autódromo de Las Paredes
- No.3 Circuit (2006–present)
- Location: San Rafael, Mendoza, Argentina
- Coordinates: 34°34′38.19″S 68°24′17.95″W
- Opened: 27 October 1968; 57 years ago
- Major events: Former: TC2000 (2002–2007); Turismo Nacional (1985, 1996, 2006–2009); Top Race V6 (2000–2001, 2003, 2006)

No.3 Circuit (2006–present)
- Length: 3.293 km (2.046 mi)
- Turns: 10
- Race lap record: 1:19.384 ( (Argentina) Mariano Werner, Crespi K4M, 2006, FR 1.6)

No.2 Circuit (2001–present)
- Length: 2.630 km (1.634 mi)
- Turns: 7
- Race lap record: 0:59.068 ( (Argentina) Juan Marcos Angelini, Crespi K4M, 2005, FR 1.6)

Original Circuit (1968–2000)
- Length: 2.150 km (1.336 mi)
- Turns: 8

Las Paredes is a 3.293 km (2.046 mi) Argentine motorsport circuit located near San Rafael, Mendoza Province. The circuit was opened in October 1968.

== Layout configurations ==
Original Circuit (1968–2000)

No.2 Circuit (2001–present)

No.3 Circuit (2006–present)

No.4 Circuit (2006–present)

== Lap records ==
As of September 2007, the fastest official race lap records at the Autódromo Las Paredes are listed as:

Category	Time	Driver	Vehicle	Event
No.3 Circuit (2006–present): 3.293 km (2.046 mi)
Formula Renault 1.6	1:19.384	Mariano Werner	Crespi K4M	2006 San Rafael Formula Renault Argentina round
TC2000	1:23.034	José María López	Honda Civic VIII	2007 San Rafael TC2000 round
Copa Mégane Argentina	1:32.174	Jorge Loyarte	Renault Mégane	2006 San Rafael Copa Mégane Argentina round
No.2 Circuit (2001–present): 2.630 km (1.634 mi)
Formula Renault 1.6	0:59.068	Juan Marcos Angelini	Crespi K4M	2005 San Rafael Formula Renault Argentina round
TC2000	1:01.214	Nelson García	Ford Focus I	2005 San Rafael TC2000 round
Copa Mégane Argentina	1:07.537	Rodríguez Nuñez	Renault Mégane	2005 San Rafael Copa Mégane Argentina round
