= Nicolás Vuyovich =

Argentine racing driver

Nicolás Vuyovich (Orán, Salta, June 29, 1981 – Córdoba, Argentina, 8 May 2005) was a sportscar driver from Argentina.

Vuyovich died the same day he clinched his first win in TC2000 series at the wheel of a Toyota Corolla. He was one of the victims of a plane crash in Córdoba (when returning from San Juan) together with his team manager and other passengers. All six people on the aircraft were killed.
