= Matías Rossi =

Argentine racing driver

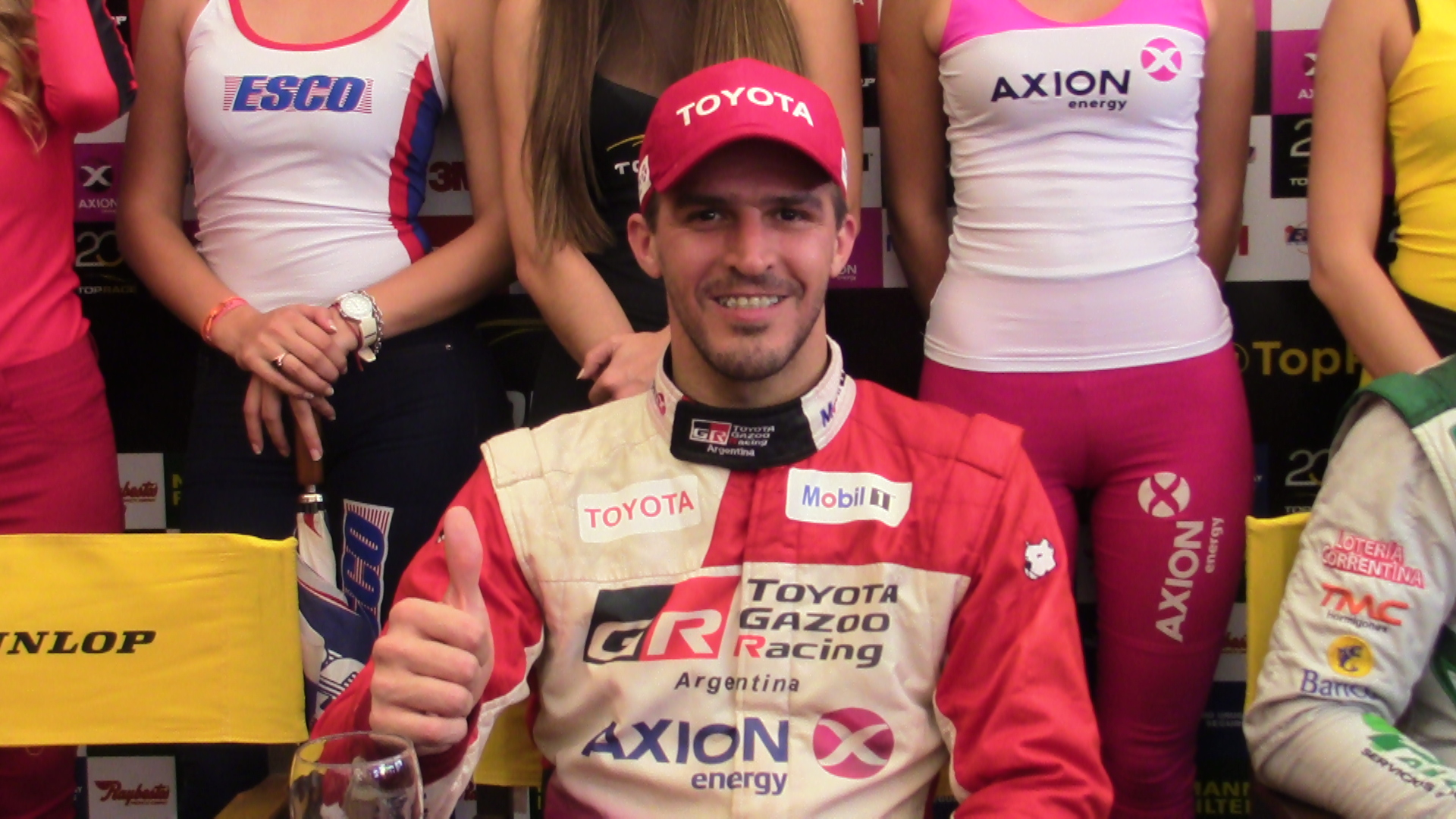
- Matías Rossi in 2017.
- Nationality: (Argentina) Argentine
- Born: Matías Leonardo Rossi; 2 April 1984 (age 42) Del Viso, Argentina

Stock Car Pro Series career
- Debut season: 2020
- Current team: Full Time Sports

Turismo Carretera
- Categorisation: FIA Platinum
- Years active: 2003–2019,2022–
- Teams: Toyota Gazoo Racing Argentina
- Car number: 117
- Former teams: Satriano Sport, Ávila Racing, JC Competición, Dole Racing, JP Racing, Donto Racing, Nova Racing
- Championships: 1 (2014)
- Wins: 25

Previous series
- 2004–2021 2017–2020 2013–2016 2011–2012 2012 2008–2009 2001–2003 2002 2000–2001: Súper TC 2000; Top Race V6; Turismo Nacional; TC Mouras; Top Race V6; Top Race V6; Fórmula Súper Renault; Italian Formula Renault; Formula Renault Argentina

Championship titles
- 2020 2020 2019 2014 2014 2013 2011 2007 2006 2002: Top Race V6; Súper TC 2000; Top Race V6; Turismo Nacional Clase 3 Turismo Carretera; Súper TC 2000; TC 2000; TC 2000; TC 2000; Fórmula Súper Renault

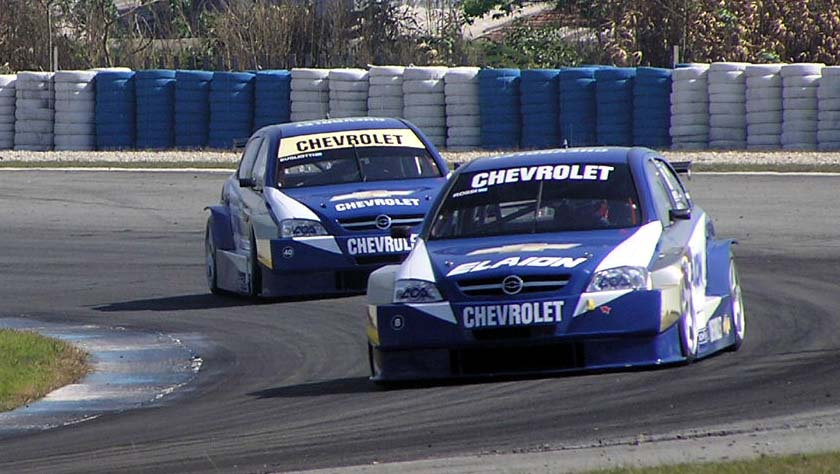
Matías Rossi at the wheel of a TC 2000 Championship Chevrolet Astra in 2006.

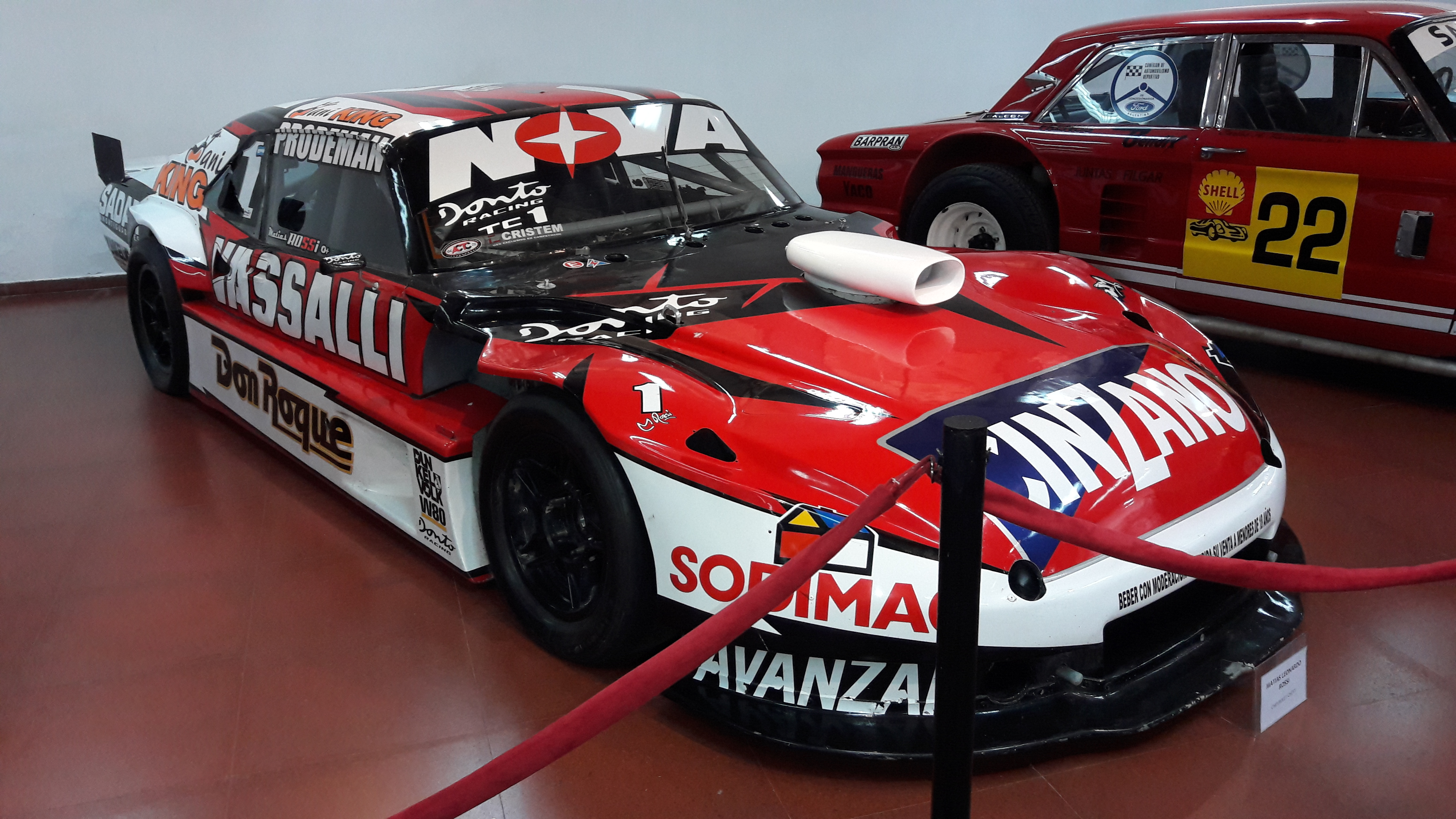
Chevrolet Turismo Carretera car of Rossi.

Matías Leonardo Rossi (born 2 April 1984) is an Argentine racecar driver. He competes full-time in the Turismo Carretera, driving the No. 117 Toyota Camry for Toyota Gazoo Racing and in the Stock Car Pro Series, driving the No. 117 Toyota Corolla for Full Time Sports.

== Biography ==
Rossi began his career by driving go-karts at the age of 11, even racing outside his homeland in the American Formula A Championships and World Formula A Championships. Returning to Argentina, he started competing in Formula Renault and then in the Formula Super Renault series.

Rossi joined the Turismo Carretera racing series in 2003. He obtained his first win in the Turismo Carretera at the Comodoro Rivadavia circuit in 2007. He would get two more victories later on that year to finish second overall for the season, behind Christian Ledesma.

In 2005, Rossi started racing in the TC2000 series as well, where he won the 2006 and 2007 championships at the wheel of Pro Racing's Chevrolet Astra. From 2008 to 2010, he raced in TC2000 for Renault, where he finished fifth, fifth and seventh. In 2010, he won the Konex Award. In 2011, Rossi joined Toyota Team Argentina and won his third TC 2000 championship that year. In 2012, he raced for Toyota in the Súper TC 2000 championship, finishing as the runner-up. He also competed in Turismo Carretera, finishing second, and in Top Race V6. In 2013, he won the championship in the Súper TC 2000; in 2014, in the Turismo Nacional and in the Turismo Carretera and in 2019 in the Top Race V6.

Rossi was once again champion of the Súper TC 2000 in 2020. That year, he also competed in Stock Car Brasil with Toyota and Full Time Sports.

== Racing record ==
=== Career summary ===
Season	Series	Team	Races	Wins	Poles	F.Laps	Podiums	Points	Position
2000	Formula Renault Argentina	N/A	2	0	0	0	0	2	45th
2001	Formula Renault Argentina	N/A	5	0	0	0	0	9	19th
2001	Formula Super Renault Argentina	N/A	8	0	0	0	3	55	8th
2002	Formula Super Renault Argentina	N/A	13	7	0	7	10	185	**1st**
2002	Formula Renault 2000 Italia Winter Series	N/A	4	0	0	0	0	0	NC
2003	Formula Super Renault Argentina	N/A	3	1	1	0	1	20	13th
2003	Turismo Carretera	N/A	11	0	0	0	0	17	47th
2004	TC 2000	E.F. Racing	1	0	0	0	0	0	NC
2004	Turismo Carretera	N/A	16	0	0	0	1	100	16th
2005	TC 2000	Pro Racing	13	1	0	0	2	64	9th
2005	Turismo Carretera	JC Competición	15	0	0	0	0	63	23rd
2006	TC 2000	Chevrolet Elaion-Pro Racing	14	5	1	4	8	186	**1st**
2006	Turismo Carretera	JC Competición	16	0	2	2	2	95	16th
2007	TC 2000	Chevrolet Elaion	14	3	1	2	9	189	**1st**
2007	Turismo Carretera	JC Competición	16	3	2	3	6	190.5	**2nd**
2008	TC 2000	Renault Lo Jack Team	13	2	0	3	3	123	5th
2008	Turismo Carretera	JC Competición	14	0	0	1	1	105	16th
2008	Top Race V6	Tauro MotorSport	12	1	0	1	3	88	13th
2009	TC 2000	Renault Lo Jack Team	12	1	1	2	5	106	5th
2009	Turismo Carretera	JC Competición	14	1	3	0	3	128.75	13th
2009	Top Race V6	Pro Racing	13	0	0	0	2	21	11th
2010	TC 2000	Renault Lo Jack Team	13	1	0	0	4	80	7th
2010	Turismo Carretera	Dole Racing Team	15	3	1	2	5	191	4th
2011	TC 2000	Toyota Team Argentina	21	5	3	3	8	197.5	**1st**
2011	Turismo Carretera	JP Racing	15	1	1	2	1	173	**3rd**
2012	Súper TC 2000	Toyota Team Argentina	13	3	1	2	8	197	**2nd**
2012	Turismo Carretera	JP Racing	15	2	2	2	5	219.5	**2nd**
2012	Top Race V6	PSG16 Team	12	2	2	3	4	44	6th
2013	Súper TC 2000	Toyota Team Argentina	12	4	2	2	6	219	**1st**
2013	Turismo Carretera	JP Racing	16	1	1	1	3	426.25	5th
2013	Turismo Nacional - Clase 3	Boero Carrera Pro	12	2	4	1	2	192	4th
2014	Súper TC 2000	Toyota Team Argentina	13	0	1	1	4	114.5	9th
2014	Turismo Carretera	Donto Racing	16	5	6	2	11	835	**1st**
2014	Turismo Nacional - Clase 3	Boero Carrera Pro	12	3	3	1	6	257	**1st**
2015	Súper TC 2000	Toyota Team Argentina	13	2	1	0	2	164	4th
2015	Turismo Carretera	Donto Racing	16	2	3	1	6	552.25	**2nd**
2015	Turismo Nacional - Clase 3	Boero Carrera Pro	12	1	1	1	2	190	5th
2016	Súper TC 2000	Toyota Team Argentina	14	3	1	1	5	196.5	**2nd**
2016	Turismo Carretera	Donto Racing	16	4	4	1	8	653.5	**3rd**
2016	Turismo Nacional - Clase 3	Citroen Total TN Racing	12	0	0	0	2	196	4th
2017	Súper TC 2000	Toyota Gazoo Racing Argentina	13	1	1	2	5	152	4th
2017	Top Race V6	Toyota Gazoo Racing Argentina	15	2	0	2	5	137	4th
2017	Turismo Carretera	Nova Racing	15	1	1	0	2	330.25	15th
2018	Súper TC 2000	Toyota Gazoo Racing Argentina	18	2	1	2	10	163	4th
2018	Top Race V6	Toyota Gazoo Racing Argentina	13	1	0	1	5	120	4th
2018	Turismo Carretera	Nova Racing	15	1	4	1	3	425.75	5th
2019	Súper TC 2000	Toyota Gazoo Racing Argentina	13	4	3	1	6	173	**2nd**
2019	Top Race V6	Toyota Gazoo Racing Argentina	16	4	3	4	12	283	**1st**
2019	Turismo Carretera	Donto Racing	14	1	2	0	2	310	15th
2020	Súper TC 2000	Toyota Gazoo Racing YPF	19	5	4	6	11	167	**1st**
2020	Top Race V6	Toyota Gazoo Racing YPF	11	4	6	2	10	211	**1st**
2020	Stock Car Brasil	Full Time Sports	18	0	0	0	1	121	18th
2021	Súper TC 2000	Toyota Gazoo Racing YPF	19	3	0	6	7	133	5th
2021	Stock Car Pro Series	Full Time Sports	17	0	0	0	0	120	20th
2022	Turismo Carretera	Toyota Gazoo Racing Argentina	14	0	0	0	3	320	12th
2022	Stock Car Pro Series	A.Mattheis Vogel Motorsport	22	2	0	2	7	262	4th
2023	Turismo Carretera	Toyota Gazoo Racing Argentina							NC
2023	Stock Car Pro Series	Full Time Sports							NC
2023	TC2000 Championship	Toyota Gazoo Racing YPF Infinia							
2024	TCR South America Touring Car Championship	Toyota Team Argentina	18	3	1	1	6	408	4th
2024	TCR World Tour	Toyota Team Argentina	4	0	0	0	0	8	25th
2024	TCR Brazil Touring Car Championship	Toyota Team Argentina	10	1	0	3	4	231	4th

=== Complete Stock Car Brasil results ===
(key) (Races in bold indicate pole position; results in italics indicate fastest lap)

Year	Team	Car	1	2	3	4	5	6	7	8	9	10	11	12	13	14	15	16	17	18	19	20	21	22	23	24	Rank	Points
2020	Full Time Sports	Toyota Corolla	GOI; 1; 11	GOI; 2; 12	INT; 1 Ret	INT; 2 Ret	LON; 1 Ret	LON; 2; 12	CAS; 1; 10	CAS; 2 Ret	CAS; 3; 10	VCA; 1; 8	VCA; 2; 2	CUR; 1; 4	CUR; 2 Ret	CUR; 3; 11	GOI; 1; 12	GOI; 2; 16	GOI; 3 Ret	INT; 1 Ret							18th	121
2021	Full Time Sports	Toyota Corolla	GOI; 1	GOI; 2	INT; 1; 19	INT; 2; 21	VCA; 1; 16	VCA; 2; 5	VCA; 1; 6	VCA; 2; 10	CAS; 1	CAS; 2	CUR; 1; 19	CUR; 2; 15	CUR; 1	CUR; 2	GOI; 1 Ret	GOI; 2 DNS	GOI; 1; 6	GOI; 2; 12	VCA; 1; 17	VCA; 2; 16	SCZ; 1; 22	SCZ; 2 Ret	INT; 1; 6	INT; 2; 8	20th	120
2022	AMattheis Vogel	Toyota Corolla	INT; 1	GOI; 1; 28	GOI; 2 Ret	RIO; 1; 2	RIO; 2 Ret	VCA; 1; 9	VCA; 2; 1	VEL; 1; 8	VEL; 2; 2	VEL; 1; 3	VEL; 2; 2	INT; 1; 1	INT; 2; 17	VCA; 1; 5	VCA; 2; 8	SCZ; 1; 6	SCZ; 2; 2	GOI; 1; 9	GOI; 2; 11	GOI; 1; 11	GOI; 2 Ret	INT; 1 Ret	INT; 2 Ret		4th	268

Sporting positions
Preceded by Diego Aventín; Luciano Burti	Winner of the 200 km de Buenos Aires; 2006 (with Alain Menu)	Succeeded by Juan Manuel Silva; Ezequiel Bosio
Preceded by Gabriel Ponce de León	TC2000 champion 2006-2007	Succeeded by José María López
Preceded by Norberto Fontana	TC2000 champion 2011	Succeeded by José María López (Súper TC); Franco Girolami (TC 2000)
Preceded by José María López	Súper TC 2000 champion 2013	Succeeded by Néstor Girolami
Preceded by Diego Aventín	Turismo Carretera; 2014	Succeeded by Omar Martínez
Preceded by Néstor Girolami; Mauro Giallombardo	Winner of the 200 km de Buenos Aires; 2015 (with Gabriel Ponce de León)	Succeeded by Agustín Canapino; Guillermo Ortelli
