= Autódromo Rosendo Hernández =

- Full Circuit (2007–present)
- Location: San Luis-San Luis, Argentina
- Coordinates: 33°20′4″S 66°23′39″W
- Opened: 2003
- Major events: Current: Turismo Carretera (2003, 2007–2009, 2011–2016, 2018–2019, 2021–present); Former: FIA World RX; World RX of Argentina (2014); TC2000 (2003–2005, 2007, 2015); Turismo Nacional (2004, 2007, 2011–2019); Top Race V6 (2014)

Full Circuit (2007–present)
- Length: 4.500 km (2.796 mi)
- Turns: 7
- Race lap record: 1:27.110 ( (Argentina) Mariano Werner, Ford Mustang Mach 1, 2026, TC)

Full Circuit (2003–2006)
- Length: 4.612 km (2.866 mi)
- Turns: 9
- Race lap record: 1:58.635 ( (Argentina) Christian Ledesma, Chevrolet Astra, 2004, TC2000)

Alternative Circuit (2003–2006)
- Length: 3.300 km (2.051 mi)
- Turns: 6
- Race lap record: 1:21.451 ( (Argentina) Juan Manuel Silva, Honda Civic VII, 2005, TC2000)

The Autódromo Rosendo Hernández is a 4.500 km (2.796 mi) motorsports circuit located in San Luis, Argentina. It has hosted events in the TC2000 Championship, Turismo Carretera and Formula Renault Argentina series, as well as the World RX of Argentina of the FIA World Rallycross Championship in 2014. The circuit is close to Potrero de los Funes Circuit, which hosted the FIA GT Championship.

== Events ==
Current

- September: Turismo Carretera, Turismo Carretera Pista, Fórmula 2 Argentina

Former

- FIA World Rallycross Championship
  - World RX of Argentina (2014)
- Formula Renault 2.0 Argentina (2003–2005, 2007, 2015)
- Top Race V6 (2014)
- Turismo Nacional (2004, 2007, 2011–2019)
- TC2000 Championship (2003–2005, 2007, 2015)

== Lap records ==
As of September 2026, the fastest official race lap records at the Autódromo Rosendo Hernández are listed as:

Category	Time	Driver	Vehicle	Event
Full Circuit (2007–present): 4.500 km (2.796 mi)
Turismo Carretera	1:27.110	Mariano Werner	Ford Mustang Mach 1	2026 San Luis Turismo Carretera round
Súper TC2000	1:31.647	Esteban Guerrieri	Toyota Corolla XI	2015 1st San Luis Súper TC2000 round
Formula Renault 2.0	1:32.531	Martín Moggia	Tito F4-A	2015 2nd San Luis Formula Renault Argentina round
Full Circuit (2003–2006): 4.612 km (2.866 mi)
TC2000	1:58.635	Christian Ledesma	Chevrolet Astra	2004 San Luis TC2000 round
Alternative Circuit (2003–2006): 3.300 km (2.051 mi)
TC2000	1:21.451	Juan Manuel Silva	Honda Civic VII	2005 San Luis TC2000 round
