= Autódromo Ezequiel Crisol =

Circuit

- Full Circuit (2020–present)
- Location: Bahía Blanca, Buenos Aires Province, Argentina
- Coordinates: 38°40′55.7″S 62°10′48.4″W
- Broke ground: 1972
- Opened: 23 March 1978; 48 years ago Re-opened: 21 February 2020; 6 years ago
- Closed: 2010
- Former names: Autódromo Aldea Romana de Bahía Blanca (1978–2010)
- Major events: Former: TC2000 (1981–1982, 1986, 1988, 1994, 1996–2004, 2007, 2022); Turismo Nacional (1979, 1981, 1985, 1990, 1992, 1996–1997, 1999–2000, 2002–2010, 2020–2022); Top Race V6 (2004, 2006–2010); Turismo Carretera (2002); Formula 3 Sudamericana (1988–1989)

Full Circuit (2020–present)
- Length: 3.000 km (1.864 mi)
- Turns: 13
- Race lap record: 1:12.482 ( (Argentina) Agustín Canapino, Chevrolet Cruze J400, 2022, TC2000)

Full Circuit (1988–2010)
- Length: 3.324 km (2.065 mi)
- Turns: 10
- Race lap record: 1:08.222 ( (Brazil) Leonel Friedrich, Reynard 883, 1989, F3)

Full Circuit (1981–1987)
- Length: 3.274 km (2.034 mi)
- Turns: 10

Original Circuit (1978–1980)
- Length: 2.020 km (1.255 mi)
- Turns: 5

Autódromo Ezequiel Crisol, or Autódromo Aldea Romana, is a 3.000 km (1.864 mi) motorsports circuit located in Buenos Aires Province, Argentina. It has hosted events in the Turismo Nacional and TC2000 series.

== History ==
The circuit was opened in March 1978, extended in 1981, and the last corner was tightened in 1988.

It was closed in 2010. Following a decades' dormancy, the circuit was restored between 2016 and 2020, redesigned by Leonardo Stella (who also designed the Circuito San Juan Villicum), and it was re-opened in 2020 with the first race of the Turismo Nacional on February 21–23.

== Layout history ==
Full Circuit (1988–2010)

Full Circuit (2020–present)

== Lap records ==
As of April 2022, the fastest official race lap records at the Autódromo Ezequiel Crisol are listed as:

Category	Time	Driver	Vehicle	Event
Full Circuit (2020–present): 3.000 km (1.864 mi)
TC2000	1:12.482	Agustín Canapino	Chevrolet Cruze J400	2022 Bahía Blanca TC2000 round
Turismo Nacional Clase 3	1:15.984	Manuel Mallo	Chevrolet Cruze	2022 Bahia Blanca Turismo Nacional round
Formula Renault 2.0	1:16.408	Nicolás Suárez	Tito F4-A	2022 Bahía Blanca Fórmula Nacional Argentina round
Turismo Nacional Clase 2	1:18.204	Christian Abdala	Toyota Etios	2022 Bahia Blanca Turismo Nacional round
Full Circuit (1988–2010): 3.324 km (2.065 mi)
Formula Three	1:08.222	Leonel Friedrich	Reynard 883	1989 Bahía Blanca F3 Sudamericana round
Formula Renault 1.6	1:16.593	Gabriel Satorra	Crespi K4M	2004 Bahía Blanca Formula Renault Argentina round
TC2000	1:17.384	Henry Martin	Chevrolet Cruze J400	1999 Bahía Blanca TC2000 round
