= Autódromo Ciudad de Paraná =

- Full Circuit (1969–present)
- Location: Paraná, Entre Ríos, Argentina
- Coordinates: 31°45′47″S 60°22′37″W
- Opened: 7 December 1969; 56 years ago
- Major events: Current: Turismo Carretera (1997–2019, 2021–2022, 2024–present); Turismo Nacional (2004–2005, 2007–2008, 2012, 2021–present); Former: TC Pick Up (2025); TC2000 (1983–1984, 1988–2002, 2004–2006, 2008, 2011, 2014, 2016–2017, 2019, 2021, 2023); Top Race V6 (2000, 2002–2012, 2015–2019, 2021, 2023–2024); F3 Sudamericana (1988, 1990, 1994–2005, 2011); SASTC (2000)

Full Circuit (1969–present)
- Length: 4.219 km (2.622 mi)
- Turns: 12
- Race lap record: 1:26.108 ( (Argentina) Juan Martín Trucco, Dodge Challenger SRT Hellcat, 2026, TC)

Short Circuit (1969–present)
- Length: 2.595 km (1.612 mi)
- Turns: 8
- Race lap record: 0:58.632 ( (Argentina) Fabiano Machado, Dallara F309, 2011, F3)

Autódromo Ciudad de Paraná is a 4.219 km (2.622 mi) motorsports circuit located in Entre Ríos, Argentina. It has hosted events in the TC2000, Top Race V6 and Turismo Carretera series and till 2011 also of the South American Formula Three Series, namely the Formula 3 Sudamericana.

== Events ==
Current

- February: Turismo Nacional
- August: Turismo Carretera, Turismo Carretera Pista, Fórmula 2 Argentina

Former

- Formula 3 Sudamericana (1988, 1990, 1994–2005, 2011)
- South American Super Touring Car Championship (2000)
- TC Pick Up (2025)
- TC Pista Pick Up (2025)
- TC2000 Championship (1983–1984, 1988–2002, 2004–2006, 2008, 2011, 2014, 2016–2017, 2019, 2021, 2023)
- Top Race V6 (2000, 2002–2012, 2015–2019, 2021, 2023–2024)

== Lap records ==
As of August 2026, the fastest official race lap records at the Autódromo Ciudad de Paraná are listed as:

Category	Time	Driver	Vehicle	Event
Full Circuit (1969–present): 4.219 km (2.622 mi)
Turismo Carretera	1:26.108	Juan Martín Trucco	Dodge Challenger SRT Hellcat	2026 Paraná Turismo Carretera round
Súper TC2000	1:27.048	Matías Rossi	Toyota Corolla Mk.12	2021 Paraná Súper TC2000 round
Formula Renault 2.0	1:29.444	Ignacio Monti	Tito F4-A	2026 Paraná Fórmula 2 Argentina round
TC Pick Up	1:30.274	Mariano Werner	Toyota Hilux	2025 Paraná TC Pick Up round
Short Circuit (1969–present): 2.595 km (1.612 mi)
Formula Three	0:58.632	Fabiano Machado	Dallara F309	2011 Paraná F3 Sudamericana round
Super Touring	1:09.051	Oscar Larrauri	Alfa Romeo 156 TS	2000 Paraná SASTC round
