= Autódromo Ciudad de Oberá =

- No. 2 Circuit (2007–present)
- Location: Oberá, Misiones, Argentina
- Coordinates: 27°29′39″S 55°10′40″W
- Opened: 4 April 1992; 34 years ago
- Major events: Current: Turismo Nacional (1993–1994, 1996, 1998–2000, 2002, 2012, 2019, 2024–present); Former: TCR South America (2025); TC2000 Championship (1992–1994, 2000–2010, 2012, 2015–2018, 2025); Top Race V6 (2011–2014, 2017); F3 Sudamericana (2000, 2002–2003); SASTC (1998–1999)

No. 1 Circuit (1992–present)
- Length: 2.607 km (1.620 mi)
- Turns: 13
- Race lap record: 1:09.830 ( (Brazil) Danilo Dirani, Dallara F301, 2003, F3)

No. 2 Circuit (2007–present)
- Length: 4.380 km (2.722 mi)
- Turns: 17
- Race lap record: 1:49.105 ( (Argentina) Agustín Canapino, Chevrolet Cruze, 2018, Súper TC2000)

No. 3 Circuit (2007–present)
- Length: 2.726 km (1.694 mi)
- Turns: 14
- Race lap record: 1:12.874 ( (Argentina) Tiago Pernía, Honda Civic Type R TCR (FL5), 2025, TCR)

Autódromo Ciudad de Oberá is a motor racing circuit located on the outskirts of the homonymous city, in Misiones Province, Argentina. It is a circuit that popularly receives national-level motorsport categories, possessing three circuit variants, No. 2 Circuit has a length of 4.380 km (2.722 mi) circuit, with an appendix formed by a straight with an extensive curve and a final counter-straight. The main straight and a group of locked corners close the circuit. The No. 1 Circuit has a length of 2.607 km (1.620 mi), which dispenses with the appendix formed by the long curve and the final straight, leaving only the main straight and locked corners. The No. 3 Circuit is a little bit longer with a length of 2.726 km (1.694 mi). In all three cases, the direction of rotation is clockwise.

== Lap records ==
As of August 2025, the fastest official race lap records at the Autódromo Ciudad de Oberá are listed as:

Category	Time	Driver	Vehicle	Event
No. 1 Circuit (1992–present): 2.607 km (1.620 mi)
Formula Three	1:09.830	Danilo Dirani	Dallara F301	2003 Oberá F3 Sudamericana round
TC2000	1:21.662	Gabriel Ponce de León	Ford Focus	2005 Oberá TC2000 round
Super Touring	1:22.742	Ingo Hoffmann	BMW 320i	1998 Oberá SASTC round
No. 2 Circuit (2007–present): 4.380 km (2.722 mi)
Súper TC2000	1:49.105	Agustín Canapino	Chevrolet Cruze	2018 Oberá Súper TC2000 round
Formula Renault 2.0	1:52.774	Martín Moggia	Tito F4-A	2015 Oberá Formula Renault Argentina round
Turismo Nacional Clase 3	1:56.877	Julián Santero	Toyota Corolla	2024 Oberá Turismo Nacional round
Turismo Nacional Clase 2	1:59.515	Alejo Cravero	Toyota Etios	2025 Oberá Turismo Nacional round
No. 3 Circuit (2007–present): 2.726 km (1.694 mi)
TCR Touring Car	1:12.874	Tiago Pernía	Honda Civic Type R TCR (FL5)	2025 Oberá TCR South America round
TC2000	1:14.437	Emiliano Stang	Toyota Corolla Cross	2025 Oberá TC2000 round
