= Carlos Okulovich =

Argentine racing driver

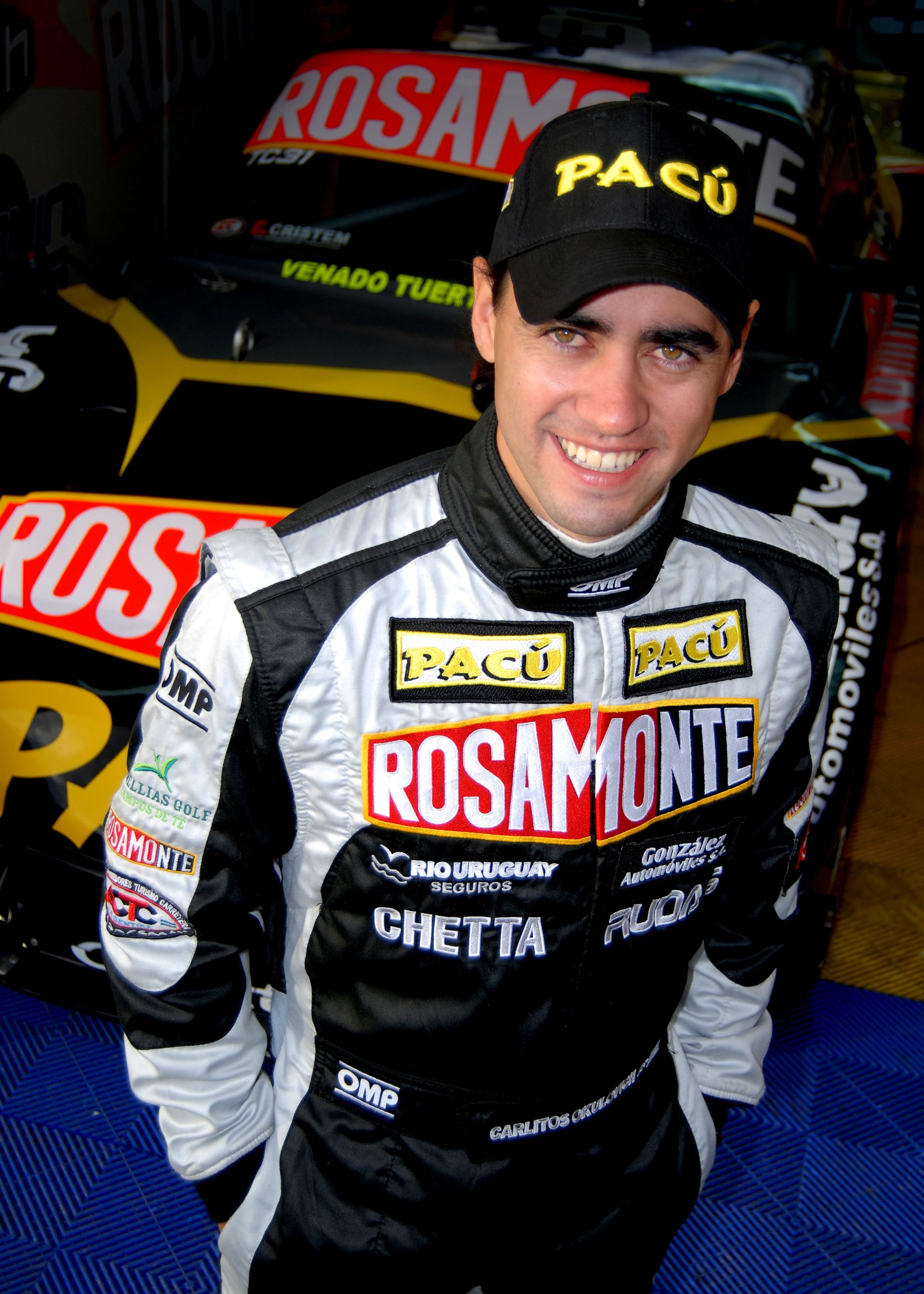
- "Carlitos" Okulovich in Misiones, Argentina
- Born: May 10, 1985 (age 41) Oberá, Misiones

Turismo Carretera career
- Debut season: 2002
- Current team: Torino, Maquin Parts
- Car number: 31
- Former teams: Honda New Civic
- Starts: 230
- Wins: 8
- Poles: 12
- Fastest laps: 8
- Best finish: 36 Podiums

Previous series
- 2011 2010: Turismo Carretera, Turismo Nacional; Turismo Carretera, Turismo Nacional

Awards
- Champion 2010 Turismo Nacional, Sub-Champion 2009 Turismo Nacional

Carlos "Carlitos" Okulovich (born 10 May 1985 in Oberá, Misiones Province) is an Argentine race car driver.

Okulovich has run in different series, including TC2000, Turismo Nacional and Turismo Carretera.

Okulovich is the son of race car driver Carlos Alberto Okulovich.

== Driving career ==
- 2001: Argentine Formula Renault Championship (Crespi Juniors)
- 2002: Argentine Formula Renault Championship (Crespi and Castro Racing Team). 3 poles and 1 win.

Class 2 of Turismo Nacional

- 2003: Class 2 and 3 of Turismo Nacional
- 2004: Class 3 of Turismo Nacional (Honda Civic - Alisi), TC2000 (Peugeot 307)
- 2005: TC2000 (Chevrolet Oficial), Class 3 of Turismo Nacional (Honda Civic - Alisi)
- 2006: TC2000 (Honda Oficial), Class 3 of Turismo Nacional (Honda Civic - Alisi) and Turismo Carretera (Chevrolet, Emilio Satriano
- 2007: TC2000 (Honda Oficial)
- 2008: TC2000 (Honda Oficial), Turismo Carretera (IKA-Renault Torino, Dole Racing), Class 3 of Turismo Nacional (Honda New Civic - Alisi)
- 2009: Turismo Carretera (IKA-Renault Torino, Dole Racing), Sub-Champion of Class 3 of Turismo Nacional (Honda New Civic - Alisi)
- 2010: Turismo Carretera (Chevrolet Chevy, Arana Inenieria Sport), Champion Class 3 of Turismo Nacional (Honda New Civic)
- 2011: Turismo Carretera (Torino, Maquin Parts), Clase 3 del Turismo Nacional (Honda Civic VIII - Alisi)
- 2012: Turismo Carretera (Dodge, Catalán Magni Motorsport, Clase 3 del Turismo Nacional (Renault Sport Team Oficial Fluence - Alisi)
- 2012: Turismo Carretera (Torino, Maquin Parts), Turismo Nacional Clase 3 (Renault Sport Team Oficial Fluence - Alisi)
- 2013: Turismo Carretera (Torino, Maquin Parts), Turismo Nacional Clase 3 (Renault Sport Team Oficial Fluence - Alisi)
- 2013: Turismo Carretera (Torino, Maquin Parts)
- 2014: Turismo Carretera (Torino, Maquin Parts)
- 2015: Turismo Carretera (Torino, Maquin Parts)
- 2016: Turismo Nacional Clase 3 (Ford Focus)
- 2017: Turismo Carretera (Torino Cherokee, Maquin Parts Racing, Turismo Nacional Clase 3 (Ford Focus, Martos Competición
- 2018: Turismo Carretera (Torino Cherokee, Maquin Parts Racing, Turismo Nacional Clase 3 (Ford Focus, Martos Competición
