= Autódromo Ciudad de Viedma =

Autódromo Viedma
- Full Circuit (2004–present)
- Location: Viedma, Río Negro, Argentina
- Coordinates: 40°51′24.5″S 63°1′10.9″W
- Opened: 25 April 2004; 22 years ago
- Major events: Current: Turismo Carretera (2015–present); Turismo Nacional (2004–2006, 2010, 2015–2019, 2023, 2025–present); Former: TC Pick Up (2021, 2023); Top Race V6 (2007, 2013, 2022); Súper TC 2000 (2004–2008, 2014)

Full Circuit (2004–present)
- Length: 4.118 km (2.559 mi)
- Turns: 8
- Race lap record: 1:30.084 ( (Argentina) Luis José di Palma, Torino Cherokee, 2017, TC)

Full Circuit with Chicanes (2004–present)
- Length: 4.150 km (2.579 mi)
- Turns: 11

Autódromo Viedma is a 4.118 km (2.559 mi) motorsports circuit located in Viedma, Argentina. It was inaugurated on April 25, 2004.

The circuit has several layouts, which allow the organization of national series events. Turismo Carretera (since 2015), Súper TC 2000 and Turismo Nacional races are held on this circuit.

== Events ==
Current

- March: Turismo Carretera, Turismo Carretera Pista, Fórmula 2 Argentina
- November: Turismo Nacional

Former

- Formula Renault 2.0 Argentina (2004, 2006–2008, 2014)
- Súper TC 2000 (2004–2008, 2014)
- TC Pick Up (2021, 2023)
- TC Pista Pick Up (2023)
- Top Race V6 (2007, 2013, 2022)
- Turismo Carretera 2000 (2025)

== Lap records ==
As of February 2025, the fastest official race lap records at the Autódromo Ciudad de Viedma are listed as:

Category	Time	Driver	Vehicle	Event
Full Circuit (2004–present): 4.118 km (2.559 mi)
Turismo Carretera	1:30.084	Luis José di Palma	Torino Cherokee	2017 Viedma Turismo Carretera round
TC2000	1:30.765	Norberto Fontana	Chevrolet Cruze	2014 Viedma Súper TC2000 round
Formula Renault 1.6	1:32.445	Mariano Werner	Tito K4M	2007 Viedma Formula Renault Argentina round
Formula Renault 2.0	1:33.261	Valentín Jara	Tito F4-A	2025 Viedma Fórmula 2 Argentina round
TC Pick Up	1:34.856	Mauricio Lambiris	Nissan Frontier	2023 Viedma TC Pick Up round
Top Race V6	1:34.860	Ian Reutemann	Lexus ES XV60	2022 Viedma Top Race V6 round
