= Juan Manuel Silva =

Argentine racing driver

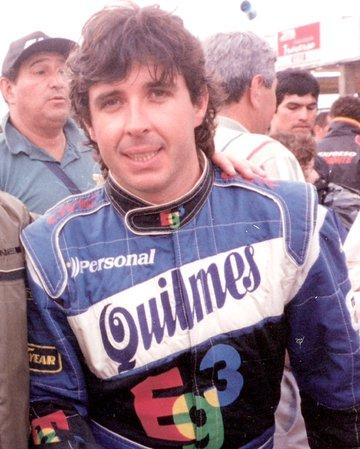
- Silva in 2000
- Nationality: Argentine
- Born: 12 October 1972 (age 54) Resistencia, Chaco Province

Championship titles
- 2005: Turismo Carretera

Juan Manuel Silva (born October 12, 1972 in Resistencia, Chaco), nicknamed el Pato ("the Duck") is an Argentine racing driver. In 1999 he was the champion of the TC 2000 competition and in 2005 he was the champion of the Turismo Carretera competition.

== Biography ==
Silva's father used to build racing cars for him. Already as a teenager he won two annual karting competitions (1986 and 1987). His last three titles are separated by six years each. He crowned himself champion of three different racing series in 1993, 1999 and 2005.

Silva was a driver of the Argentine Formula Renault before competing in the TC2000 series. He spent part of the 1990s in Japan and returned to Argentina and to TC 2000 and Turismo Carretera in 1998.

Silva spent the late 2000s in TC2000 driving at the Honda works team with great success. He was vice-champion in 2006 and 2009, third in 2008 and seventh in 2007. He moved to Renault in 2010, where he had a disastrous season and finished 15th in the standings. Silva moved to the champion team Ford in 2011.

Silva has also competed at several editions of the Dakar Rally since 2011.

Sporting positions
| Preceded by Norberto Della Santina | Argentine Formula Renault Champion; 1993 | Succeeded by Guillermo Di Giacinti |
| Preceded by Omar Martínez | TC2000 champion 1999 | Succeeded by Daniel Cingolani |
| Preceded by Omar Martínez | Turismo Carretera champion 2005 | Succeeded by Norberto Fontana |
| Preceded by Matías Rossi; Alain Menu | Winner of the 200 km de Buenos Aires; 2007 (with Ezequiel Bosio) | Succeeded by José María López; Anthony Reid |
