= TC2000 Championship =

Auto racing championship in Argentina

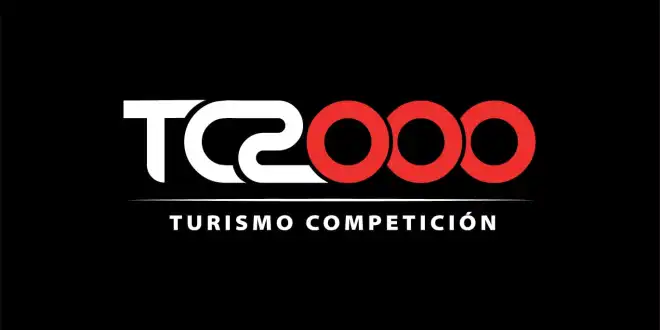
- Category: Touring cars
- Country: Argentina
- Inaugural season: 1979
- Drivers' champion: Leonel Pernía
- Makes' champion: Renault
- Teams' champion: Axion Energy Sport
- Official website: TC2000 Official; TC2000 Series Official

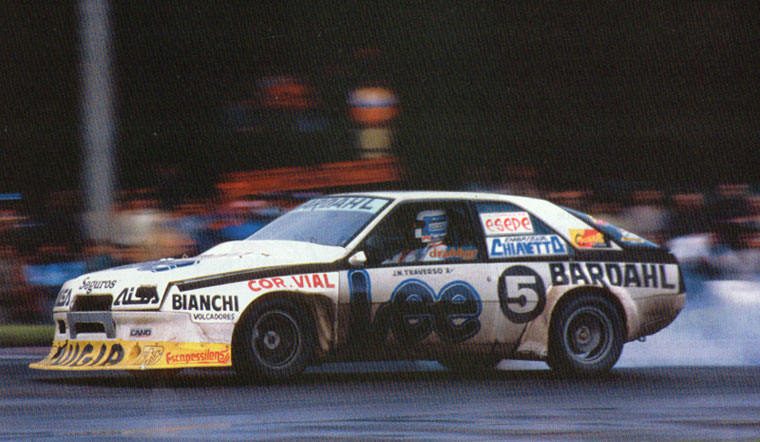
Renault Fuego of Juan María Traverso.

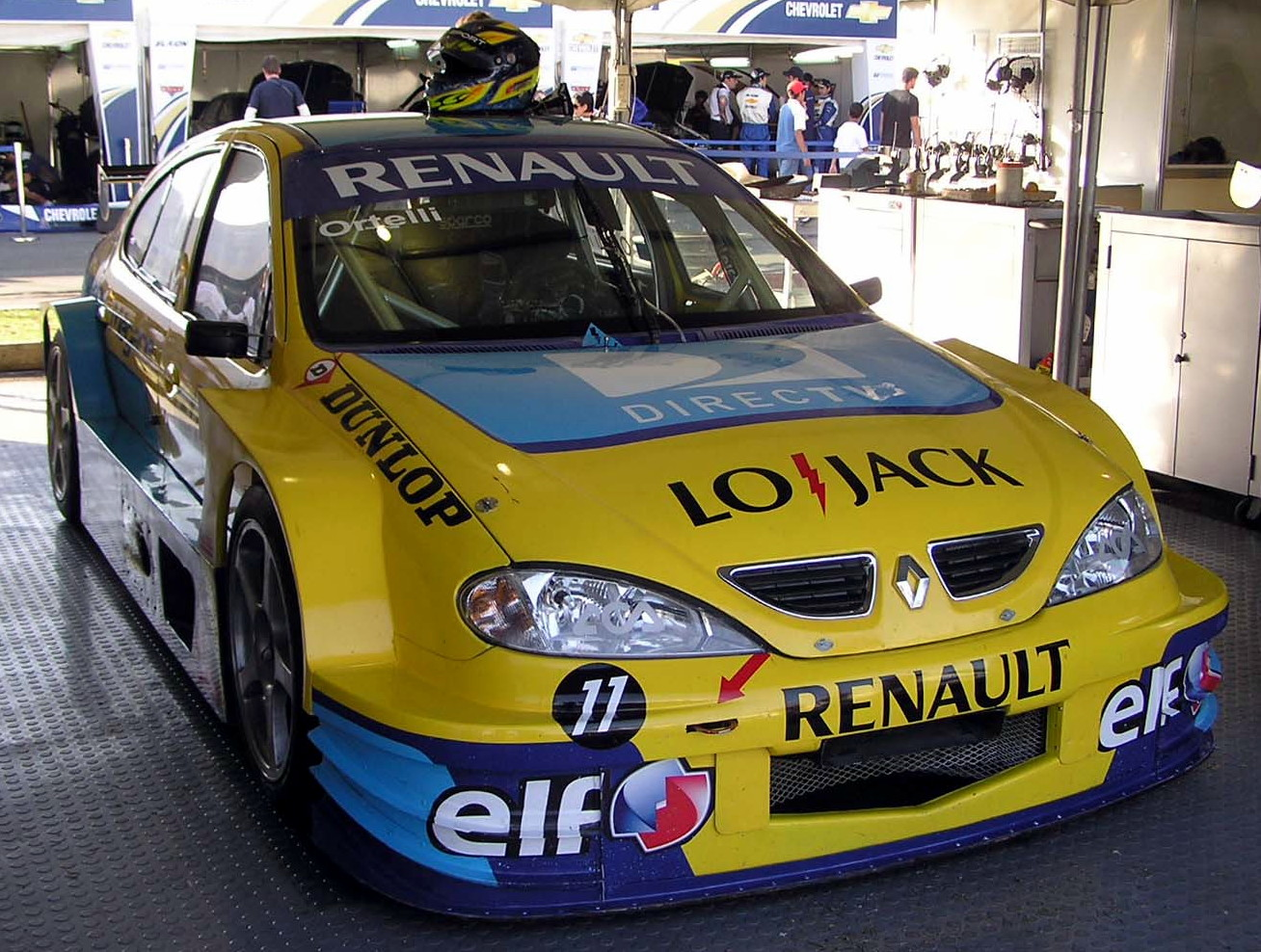
Mégane Argentina TC2000 racing car in 2006.

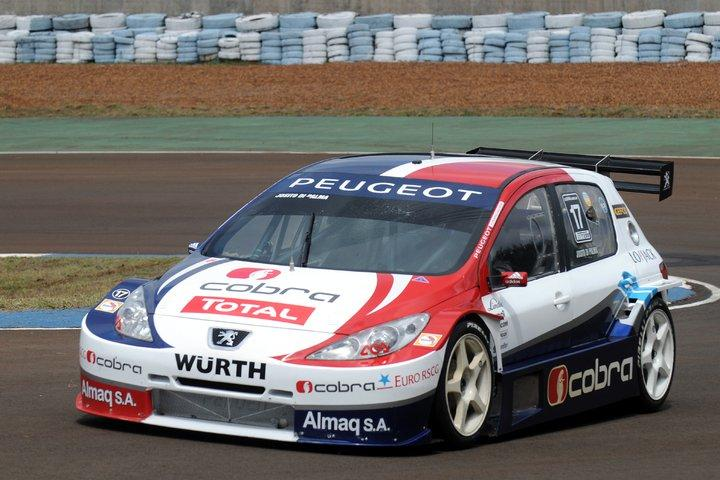
2010 Peugeot 307 TC2000

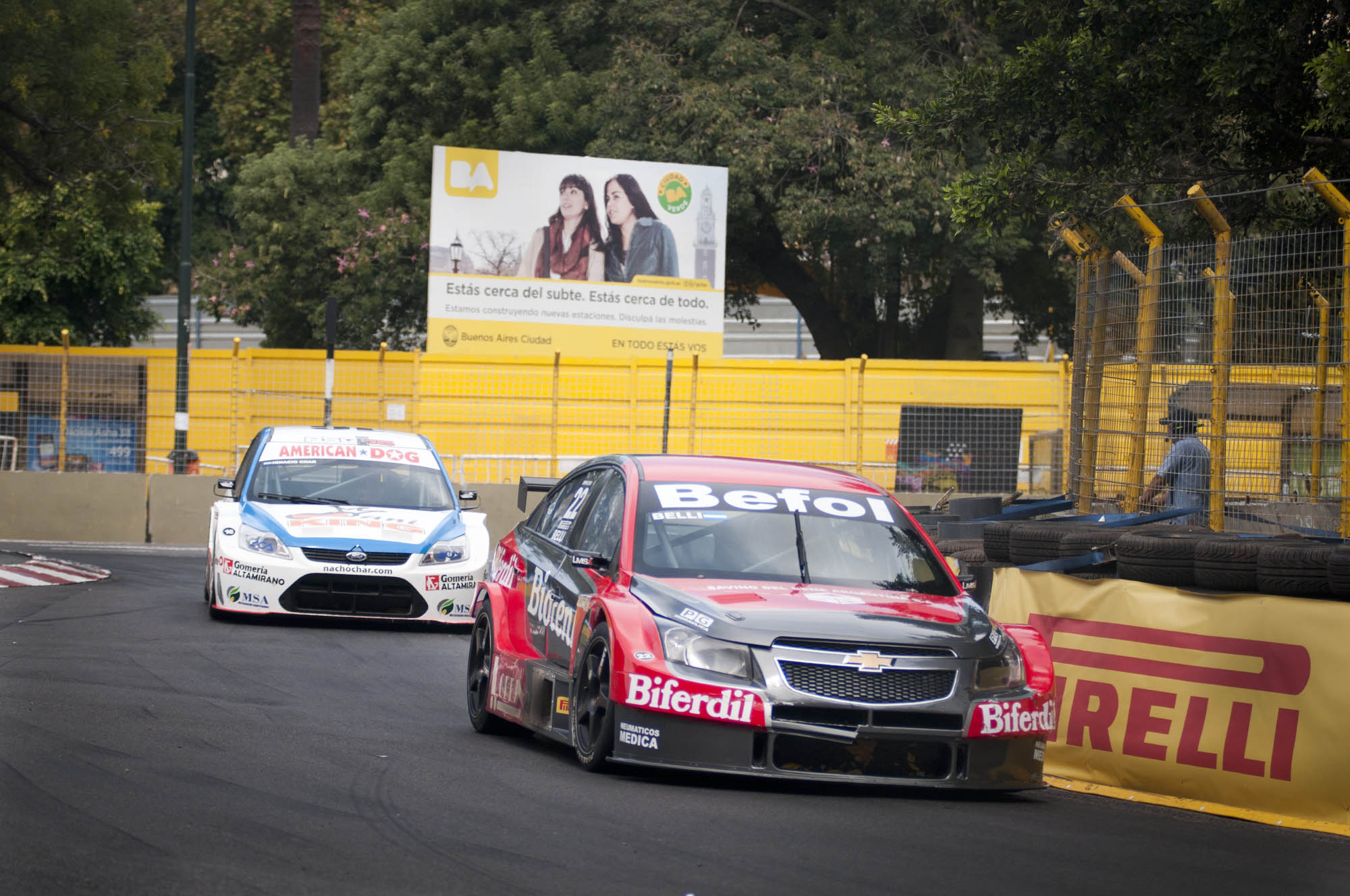
The Súper TC2000 in the Buenos Aires street circuit.

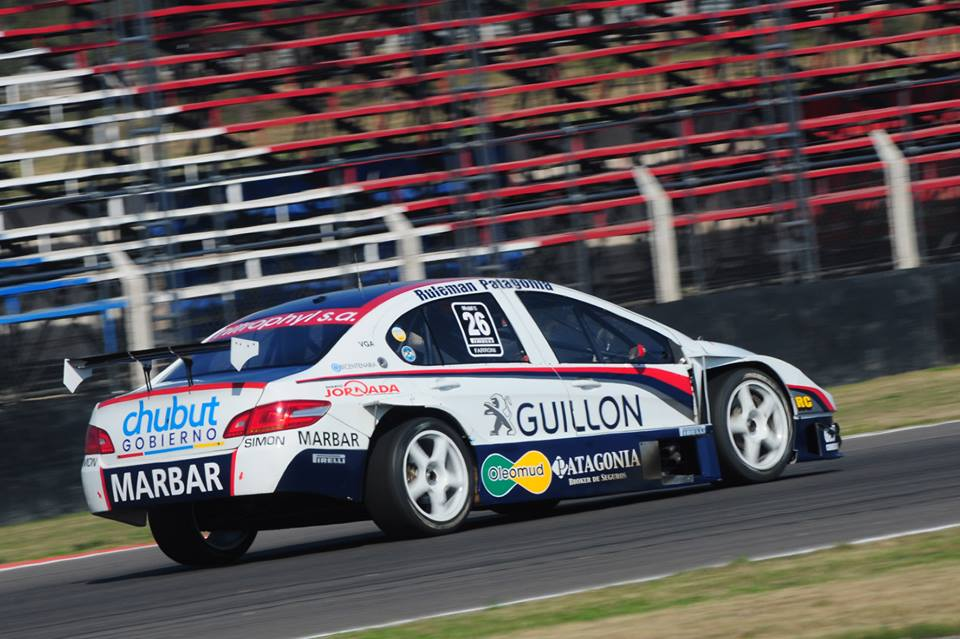
Peugeot 408 STC2000.

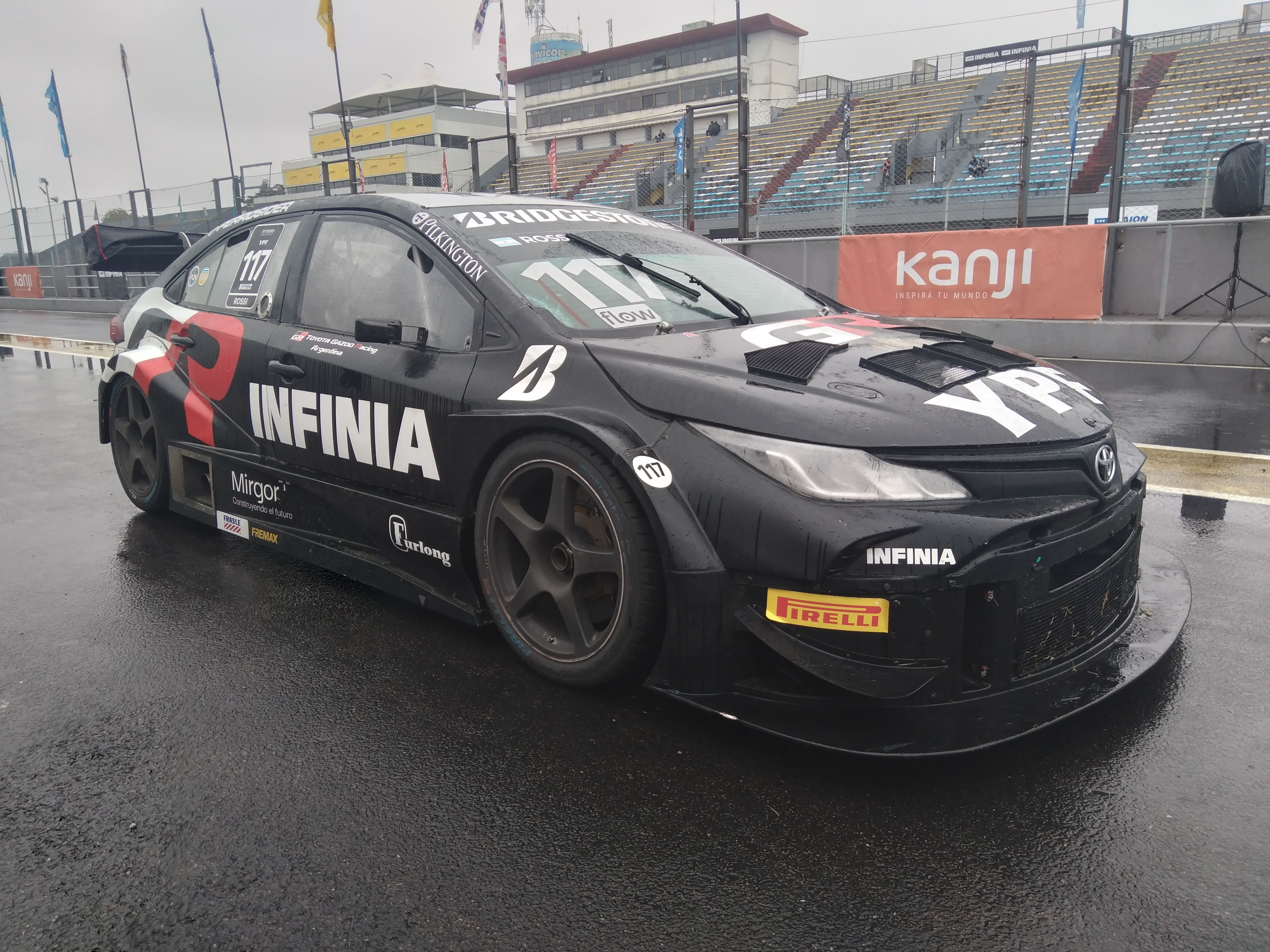
2024 Toyota Gazoo Racing Argentina Corolla.

The TC2000 (Turismo Competición 2000, formerly Súper TC2000) is a touring car racing series held in Argentina since 1979.

== Rules ==
Prior to 2012, engines of up to 2,000 cubic centimetres (120 cu in) were allowed, with only limited modifications from standard engines. This was both to reduce running costs, and give a level playing field to every team. Variable valve timing, variable intake geometry, anti-lock braking systems and traction control are all forbidden.

From the 2012 season, Radical Performance Engines will provide 2.7 litres (160 cu in) RPE TCX V8 engines (a front-wheel-drive variant of the RPX, originally found in the Radical SR8), capable of producing 430 brake horsepower (320 kW), in place of the previous 2 litres (120 cu in) engines. The series was renamed to Súper TC2000. Meanwhile, cars with the old regulation continue competing as a second-tier championship with the name TC2000, currently with an independent calendar.

The V8 engines were finally replaced from the year 2019 by new provider, the French manufacturer Oreca, these being 2.0 litres (120 cu in) turbocharged 4-cylinder in-line.

In 2022, the series changed its name again. The Super TC2000 got its name back from the TC2000 and the TC2000 was renamed the TC2000 Series.

== Technical regulations ==
The technical regulations of the 2024 season:

- Chassis construction: Tubular
- Engine: 2.0-liter (120 cu in) 4-cylinder in-line
- Aspiration: turbocharged
- Fuel capacity: 100 liters (26 US gal)
- Fuel: YPF Infinia
- Tires: Pirelli Zero Slick and Cinturato Rain
- Minimum weight: 1,120 kg (2,469 lb)
- Power output: Approximately 380 hp (283 kW) at a maximum of 6,500 RPM
- Gearbox: Six-speed
- Drivetrain: Front-wheel drive

== TC2000 teams ==
=== 2024 season ===
Factory teams:

- YPF Honda RV Racing – Honda Civic
- Toyota Gazoo Racing YPF Infinia – Toyota Corolla

Private teams:

- Axion Energy Sport – Renault Fluence
- YPF Elaion Auro Pro Racing – Chevrolet Cruze
- JM Motorsport – Chevrolet Cruze and Ford Focus
- Octanos Competición – Fiat Cronos
- Halcón Motorsport – Toyota Corolla
- Corsi Sport – Toyota Corolla
- Chaco Racing Team – Citroën C4 Lounge

== Scoring systems ==
=== 2011–2018 ===
Position	1	2	3	4	5	6	7	8	9	10	11	12	13	14	15	PP
Qualifying race	5	4	3	2	1	0										0
Regular final	26	21	18	16	14	12	10	8	7	6	5	4	3	2	1	1
Special final	30	24	20	17	16	15	14	13	12	10	8	6	4	2	1	1
Buenos Aires 200 km	34	29	25	22	20	18	16	14	12	10	8	6	4	2	1	1

=== 2019–2020 ===
Position	1st	2nd	3rd	4th	5th	6th	7th	8th	9th	10th
Qualifying	2									
Race	20	15	12	10	8	6	4	3	2	1
Super Qualifying	3									
Buenos Aires 200 km	30	25	21	17	14	11	8	5	3	1

=== 2021 ===
Position	1st	2nd	3rd	4th	5th	6th	7th	8th	9th	10th
Qualifying	3	2	1							
Race	20	15	12	10	8	6	4	3	2	1

=== 2022–2024 ===
Position	1st	2nd	3rd	4th	5th	6th	7th	8th	9th	10th	11th	12th	13th	14th	15th
Qualification	3	2	1												
Race 1	20	15	12	10	8	6	4	3	2	1					
Race 2	25	21	18	14	10	7	5	4	3	1					
Single race weekend	40	32	26	20	15	10	6	4	2	1					
200 km sprint	15	12	10	8	6	5	4	3	2	1					
200 km race	45	39	34	30	26	22	18	14	10	8	6	4	3	2	1

== Champions ==
Season	Champion	Car	Team			
1979	(Argentina) Osvaldo López	Peugeot 504	Osvaldo López Competición			
1980	(Argentina) Jorge Omar del Río	Volkswagen 1500	Pianetto Competición			
1981	(Argentina) Jorge Omar del Río	Volkswagen 1500	Pianetto Competición			
1982	(Argentina) Jorge Omar del Río	Volkswagen 1500	Pianetto Competición			
1983	(Argentina) Luis Rubén di Palma	Volkswagen 1500	Di Palma Competición			
1984	(Argentina) Mario Gayraud	Ford Taunus	Herceg Competición			
1985	(Argentina) Rubén Daray	Ford Sierra	Akel Competición			
1986	(Argentina) Juan María Traverso	Renault Fuego	Berta Sport			
1987	(Argentina) Silvio Oltra	Renault Fuego	Benavidez Competición			
1988	(Argentina) Juan María Traverso	Renault Fuego	Berta Sport			
1989	(Argentina) Miguel Ángel Guerra	Renault Fuego	Berta Sport			
1990	(Argentina) Juan María Traverso	Renault Fuego	Berta Sport			
1991	(Argentina) Juan María Traverso	Renault Fuego	Berta Sport			
1992	(Argentina) Juan María Traverso	Renault Fuego	Berta Sport			
1993	(Argentina) Juan María Traverso	Renault Fuego	Berta Sport			
1994	(Argentina) Guillermo Maldonado	Volkswagen Gol	VW YPF Motorsport			
1995	(Argentina) Juan María Traverso	Peugeot 405	Peugeot Sport			
1996	(Argentina) Ernesto Bessone	Ford Escort	Esso Competición			
1997	(Argentina) Henry Martin	Ford Escort Zetec	Ford YPF Berta Motorsport			
1998	(Argentina) Omar Martínez	Honda Civic	Honda Team Pro Racing			
1999	(Argentina) Juan Manuel Silva	Honda Civic	Honda Team Pro Racing			
2000	(Argentina) Daniel Cingolani	Ford Escort Zetec	Ford Repsol YPF Berta Motorsport			
2001	(Argentina) Gabriel Ponce de León	Ford Escort Zetec	Ford Repsol YPF Berta Motorsport			
2002	(Argentina) Norberto Fontana	Toyota Corolla	Toyota Team Argentina			
2003	(Argentina) Gabriel Ponce de León	Ford Focus	Ford YPF Berta Motorsport			
2004	(Argentina) Christian Ledesma	Chevrolet Astra	Chevrolet Pro Racing			
2005	(Argentina) Gabriel Ponce de León	Ford Focus	Ford YPF Berta Motorsport			
2006	(Argentina) Matías Rossi	Chevrolet Astra	Chevrolet Pro Racing			
2007	(Argentina) Matías Rossi	Chevrolet Astra	Chevrolet Pro Racing			
2008	(Argentina) José María López	Honda Civic Si	Honda Petrobras			
2009	(Argentina) José María López	Honda Civic Si	Equipo Petrobras			
2010	(Argentina) Norberto Fontana	Ford Focus	Ford-YPF			
2011	(Argentina) Matías Rossi	Toyota Corolla	Toyota Team Argentina			
Super TC2000				TC2000 (2nd Division)		
2012	(Argentina) José María López	Ford Focus	PSG16 Team	(Argentina) Franco Girolami	Fiat Linea	Pro Racing
2013	(Argentina) Matías Rossi	Toyota Corolla	Toyota Team Argentina	(Argentina) Matías Milla	Fiat Linea	Pro Racing
2014	(Argentina) Néstor Girolami	Peugeot 408	Peugeot Lo Jack Team	(Argentina) Facundo Della Motta	Honda Civic	Sportteam
2015	(Argentina) Néstor Girolami	Peugeot 408	Peugeot Lo Jack Team	(Argentina) Emmanuel Cáceres	Honda Civic	PSG-16 Team
2016	(Argentina) Agustín Canapino	Chevrolet Cruze	Equipo Chevrolet YPF	(Argentina) Antonino García	Ford Focus	Escudería Fela by RAM
2017	(Argentina) Facundo Ardusso	Renault Fluence	Renault Sport	(Argentina) Manuel Luque	Renault Fluence	Ambrogio Racing Argentina
2018	(Argentina) Facundo Ardusso	Renault Fluence	Renault Sport	(Argentina) Marcelo Ciarrocchi	Citroën C4 Lounge	Citroën Total Racing by PSG
2019	(Argentina) Leonel Pernía	Renault Fluence	Renault Sport	(Argentina) Nicolás Moscardini	Renault Fluence	Ambrogio Racing Argentina
2020	(Argentina) Matías Rossi	Toyota Corolla	Toyota Gazoo Racing YPF Infinia	(Argentina) Exequiel Bastidas	Toyota Corolla	FDC Motor Sports
2021	(Argentina) Agustín Canapino	Chevrolet Cruze	Chevrolet YPF	(Argentina) Jorge Barrio	Renault Fluence	Ambrogio Racing
TC2000				TC2000 Series		
2022	(Argentina) Leonel Pernía	Renault Fluence	Axion Energy Sport	(Argentina) Facundo Marques	Renault Fluence	Ambrogio Racing
2023	(Argentina) Leonel Pernía	Renault Fluence	Axion Energy Sport	(Argentina) Mateo Polakovich	Ford Focus	JM Motorsport
2024	(Argentina) Leonel Pernía	Renault Fluence	Axion Energy Sport			

== See also ==
- Stock Car Brasil
- Turismo Carretera
