= Jorge Boero =

Jorge Boero may refer to:

- Jorge Andrés Boero (1973–2012), Argentine motorcycle racer
- Jorge Martínez Boero (1937–2004), Argentine racing driver
