= Roberto Mouras =

Argentine racing driver (1948–1992)

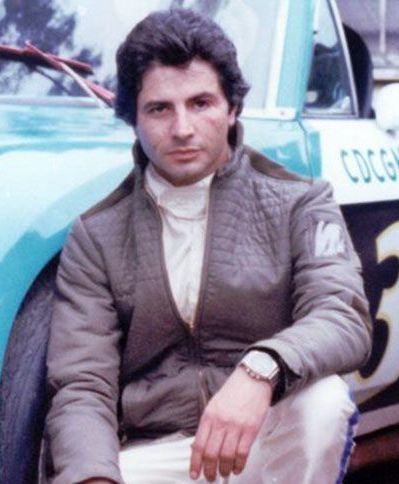
- Mouras in 1978
- Nationality: Argentine
- Born: 16 February 1948 Moctezuma, Carlos Casares Partido, Buenos Aires Province
- Died: 22 November 1992 (aged 44) Lobos, Buenos Aires Province

Championship titles
- 1983, 1984, 1985: Turismo Carretera

Roberto José Mouras (February 16, 1948 – November 22, 1992) was an Argentine racing driver. He won the 1983, 1984 and 1985 Turismo Carretera championships. Also, he won 50 races in this series between his debut in 1970 and his fatal accident in 1992.

== Racing career ==
Mouras started his racing career in the 60s. He made his debut in Turismo Carretera in 1970, driving a Torino.

Mouras switched to Chevrolet in 1975 and made his first victory in 1976, at Bahía Blanca. He won the next five races, achieving a total of six consecutive wins that remain a record to this day. But despite this, Mouras lost the championship to Héctor Gradassi.

In 1980, Mouras would change his allegiance again, going from Chevrolet to Dodge. With Dodge, Mouras achieved his greatest successes, as he won all three championships in 1983, 1984 and 1985, in addition to a small tournament disputed in late 1981. Of Mouras' 50 wins, 27 were in his period with Dodge between 1981 and 1985.

In 1986, Mouras returned to Chevrolet. He won a total of 15 races after this.

=== Death ===
Mouras died on November 22, 1992, during a race in Lobos, the penultimate race of that year. Mouras's car blew it's left front tire, causing him to lose control of the car and hit a mound of dirt. The violence of the impact caused severe damage to the left side of the car, killing Mouras almost instantly. In the accident, his co-driver Amadeo González was also injured. He died two days later.

The race was immediately red flagged. For this, Mouras declared the winner of the race, which would be his 50th victory in Turismo Carretera.

== Legacy ==
In his memory, the Autódromo Roberto Mouras in La Plata bears his name. A thematic museum in Carlos Casares about his life and career. In Lobos, Mouras is honored at the accident site.

Sporting positions
Preceded by Jorge Martínez Boero	Turismo Carretera champion 1983, 1984, 1985	Succeeded by Oscar Angeletti
