= Boero =

Boero is an Italian surname. Notable people with the surname include:

- Alejandra Boero (1918–2006), Argentine theater actress and director
- Felipe Boero (1884–1958), Argentine composer and music educator
- Jorge Andrés Boero (1973–2012), Argentine motorcycle racer
- Jorge Martínez Boero (1937–2004), Argentine racing driver
- Guillermo Estévez Boero (1930–2000), Argentine student activist, lawyer and Socialist politician (PSP)
