= Oscar Aventín =

Argentine racing driver

Oscar Raúl "El Puma" Aventín (born December 26, 1946, in Morón) is a retired race car driver from Argentina. He competed in the Turismo Carretera (TC) series together with his brother Antonio.

After taking part in some zonal races, Aventín started racing in Turismo Carretera in 1977, first with his brother Antonio (Tony), who was TC Champion 1980–1981 at the wheel of a Dodge. Oscar was triple vice-champion from 1979 to 1982 and won eight races. As of 1983, he switched to a Ford, although he made brief comebacks in his Dodge until 1988. He clinched the 1991 and 1992 Championships at the wheel of a Ford Falcon.

Aventín announced his retirement in 1993, but returned from 1994 onwards driving for Dodge and then for Chevrolet. He officially retired from car racing in 1997 and became president of the ACTC board, over which he presided from 2002 to 2013.

Oscar and Antonio are the only brothers who managed to emulate Óscar and Juan Gálvez as TC Champions. Oscar's son, Diego is an active Turismo Carretera driver.

Sporting positions
Preceded by Emilio Satriano	Turismo Carretera champion 1991-1992	Succeeded by Walter Hernández
