= Torino TC 2024 =

Argentine race car

Torino NG
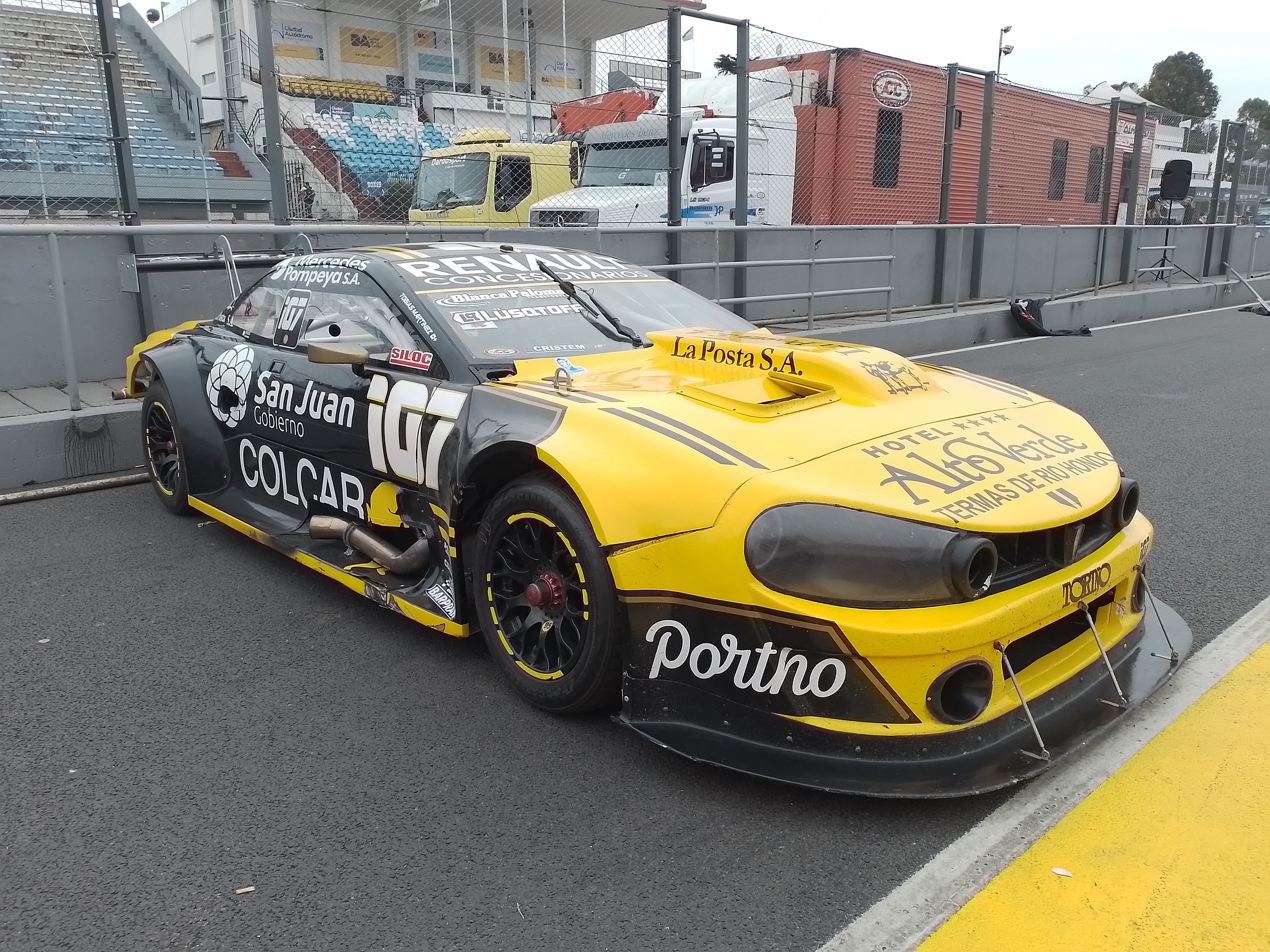
- Torino NG of Tobías Martínez at the Autódromo Oscar y Juan Gálvez, August 2024
- Category: ACTC stock car
- Constructor: Trotta Racing Team
- Designer(s): Francisco Russo (Division Creative Lab)

Technical specifications
- Engine: AMC XJ 3.21 L (195.9 cu in) DOHC I6 naturally-aspirated FR
- Transmission: 6-speed sequential manual
- Weight: 1,315 kg (2,899 lb)

Competition history
- Competition: Turismo Carretera
- Notable entrants: Trotta Racing Team; Candela Competición; Sprint Racing; Alifraco Sport
- Notable drivers: (Argentina) Tobías Martínez (Uruguay) Marcos Landa (Argentina) Kevin Candela (Argentina) Nicolás Cotignola (Argentina) Facundo Chapur (Argentina) Ignacio Faín (Argentina) Sebastián Abella
- Debut: 2024 Turismo Carretera El Calafate round
- First win: 2024 Turismo Carretera El Calafate round

The Torino NG (also referred to as Torino TC 2024 and Torino Concepto 2024) is a stock car designed to race in Asociación Corredores de Turismo Carretera-sanctioned series including Turismo Carretera.

== History ==
The IKA-Renault Torino was an Argentine-built coupé based on the AMC Rambler. A version of this car competed in Argentina's premier motorsport championship – Turismo Carretera – beginning in 1967, winning four titles in its first five seasons. Following the discontinuation of vehicle production in 1982 and technical restrictions imposed on both the Torino and the Dodge GTX in 1989, its use declined until the ACTC allowed the fitment of the AMC XJ "Cherokee" engine in 1995 – thereafter becoming a popular alternative to the Ford and Chevrolet counterparts, and resulting in the first title for the brand in 51 years through José Manuel Urcera in 2022.

For 2024, the ACTC introduced new models based on American pony cars from the existing manufacturers as well as a facelift to the recently introduced Toyota Camry. As no modern version of an IKA/Renault exists, the ACTC allowed for a 'concept' Torino based on the original car of the 1960s and 70s to be built and raced. Following over 90 design applications, six were put to a fan vote with Francisco Russo's Dodge Challenger Hellcat-inspired design being selected. Trotta Racing Team (Renault Argentina's affiliated team in Turismo Carretera) were tasked with building the first cars from scratch, and were forced to make some alterations to the design from a practical standpoint – including using the roof from a Toyota Corolla, albeit modified.

The first TC 2024 was completed a week prior to the first event of the 2024 season, with just under two months of build time and no testing. Reigning TC Pista champion and top class rookie Tobías Martínez was tasked with débuting the car at the first round of the season in El Calafate, and pulled off a shock victory after the top four finishers were all either penalised or disqualified.
