= Dante Emiliozzi =

Argentine racing driver

Dante José María Emiliozzi (born January 16, 1916, in Olavarría, died January 24, 1989) was an Argentine racing driver.

Emiliozzi won the Turismo Carretera championship four times (1962, 1963, 1964 and 1965).

Emiliozzi raced with a Baufer-Ford which is now in the Museo Juan Manuel Fangio.

Sporting positions
Preceded by Juan Gálvez	Turismo Carretera champion 1962-1965	Succeeded by Juan Manuel Bordeu
