= Turismo Carretera =

Argentine stock car racing series

- Category: Stock cars
- Country: Argentina
- Inaugural season: 1937
- Drivers' champion: Agustín Canapino
- Makes' champion: Chevrolet
- Teams' champion: Canning Motorsports
- Official website: ACTC.org.ar

Turismo Carretera (Road racing, lit., Road Touring) is a popular stock car racing series in Argentina, and the oldest auto racing series still active in the world. The series is organized by Asociación Corredores de Turismo Carretera.

== History ==
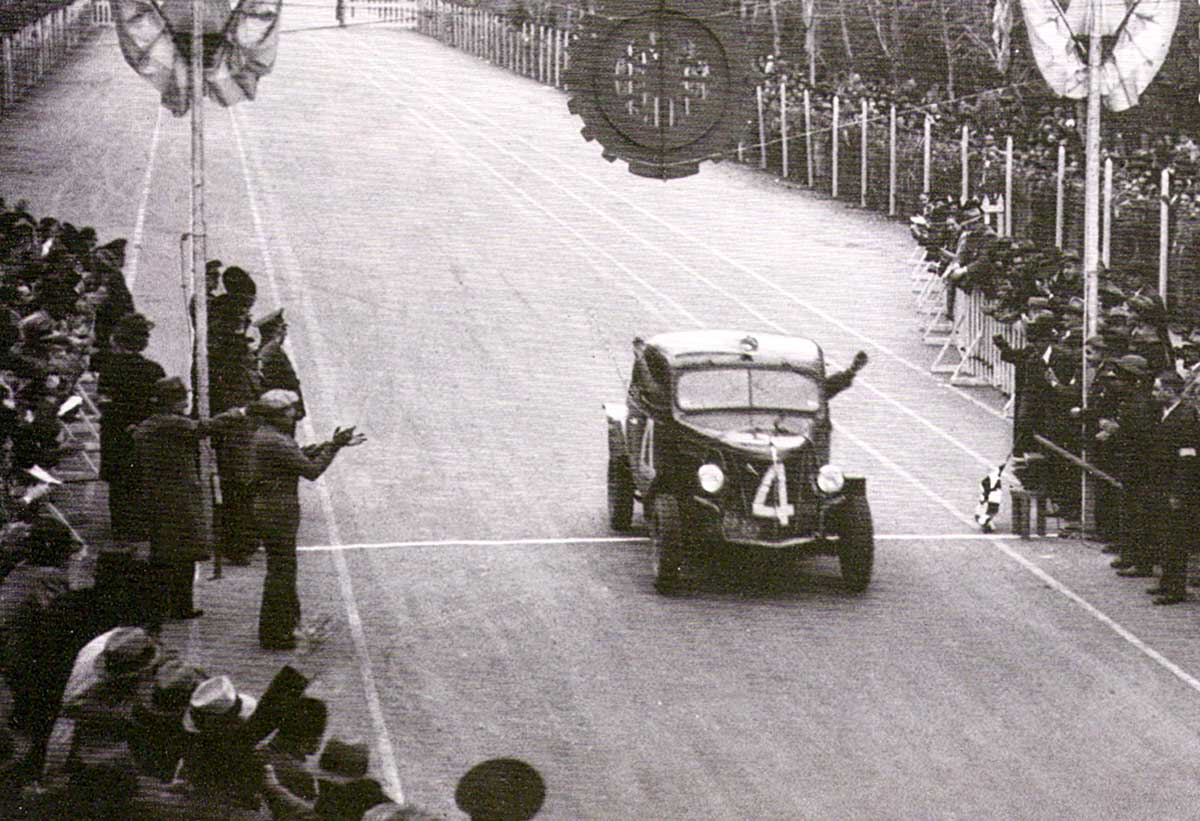
Ángel Lo Valvo wins the first official Turismo Carretera event – the 1937 Gran Premio Argentino de Carretera.

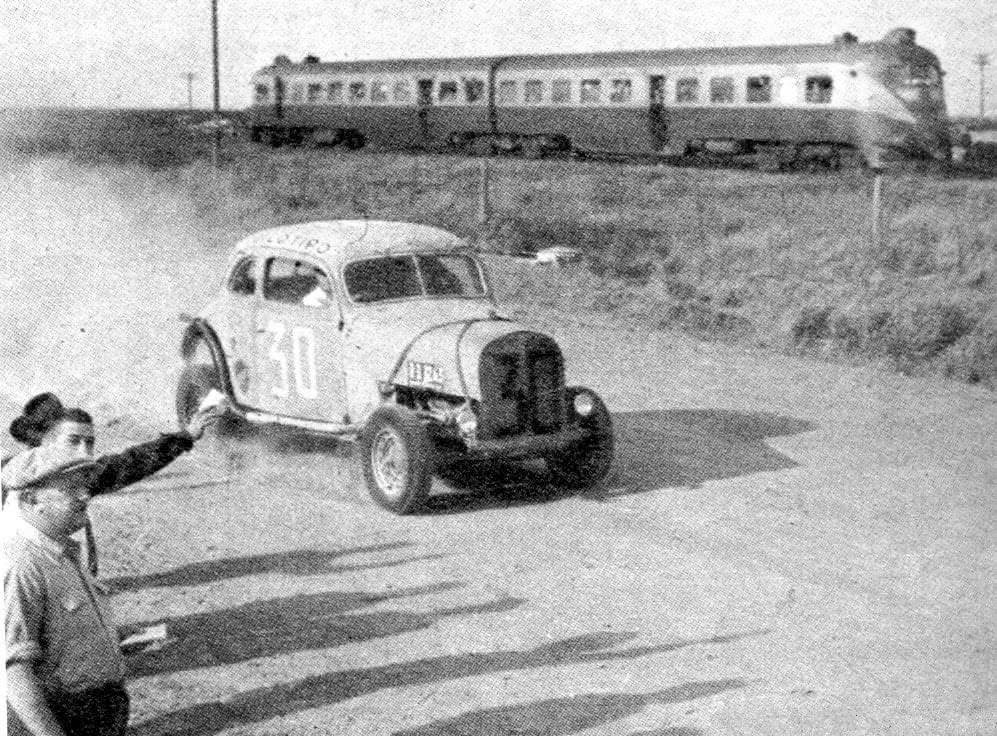
Production-based coupés remained in use into the 1950s.

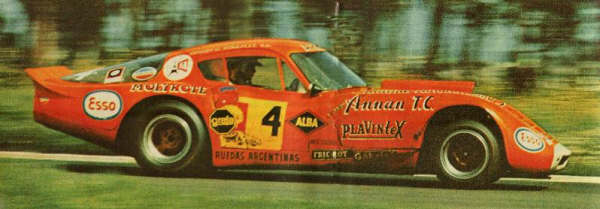
Prototype cars, such as the Trueno Naranja, rose to prominence in the late-1960s.

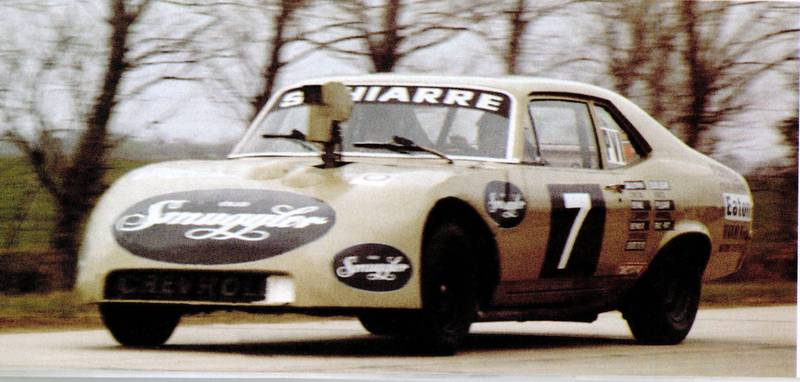
The series began to evolve into the current format during the 1970s.

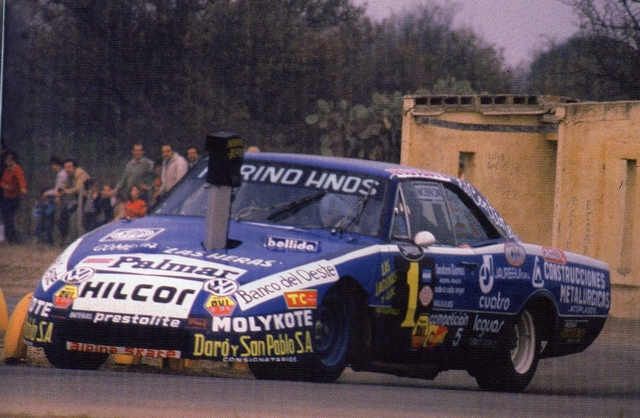
The Dodge brand won eight of the ten championships in the 1980s.

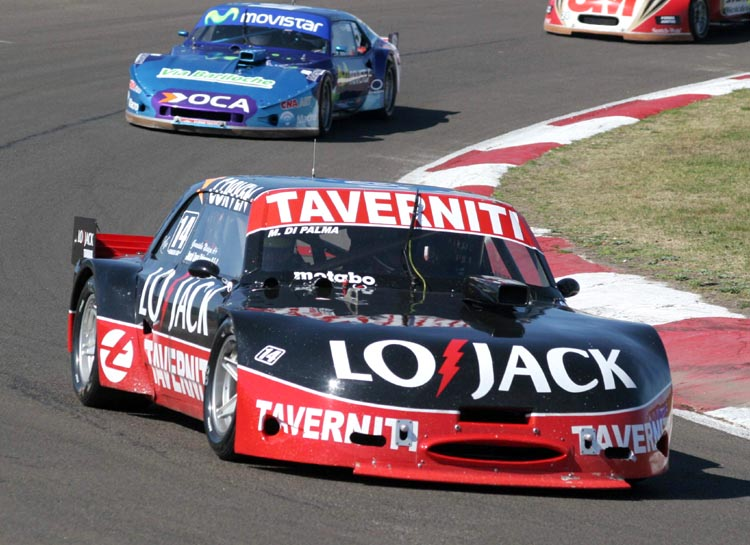
Outdated Dodge and Torino models (pictured in 2006) received Jeep mechanical componentry to keep them competitive during the 1990s.

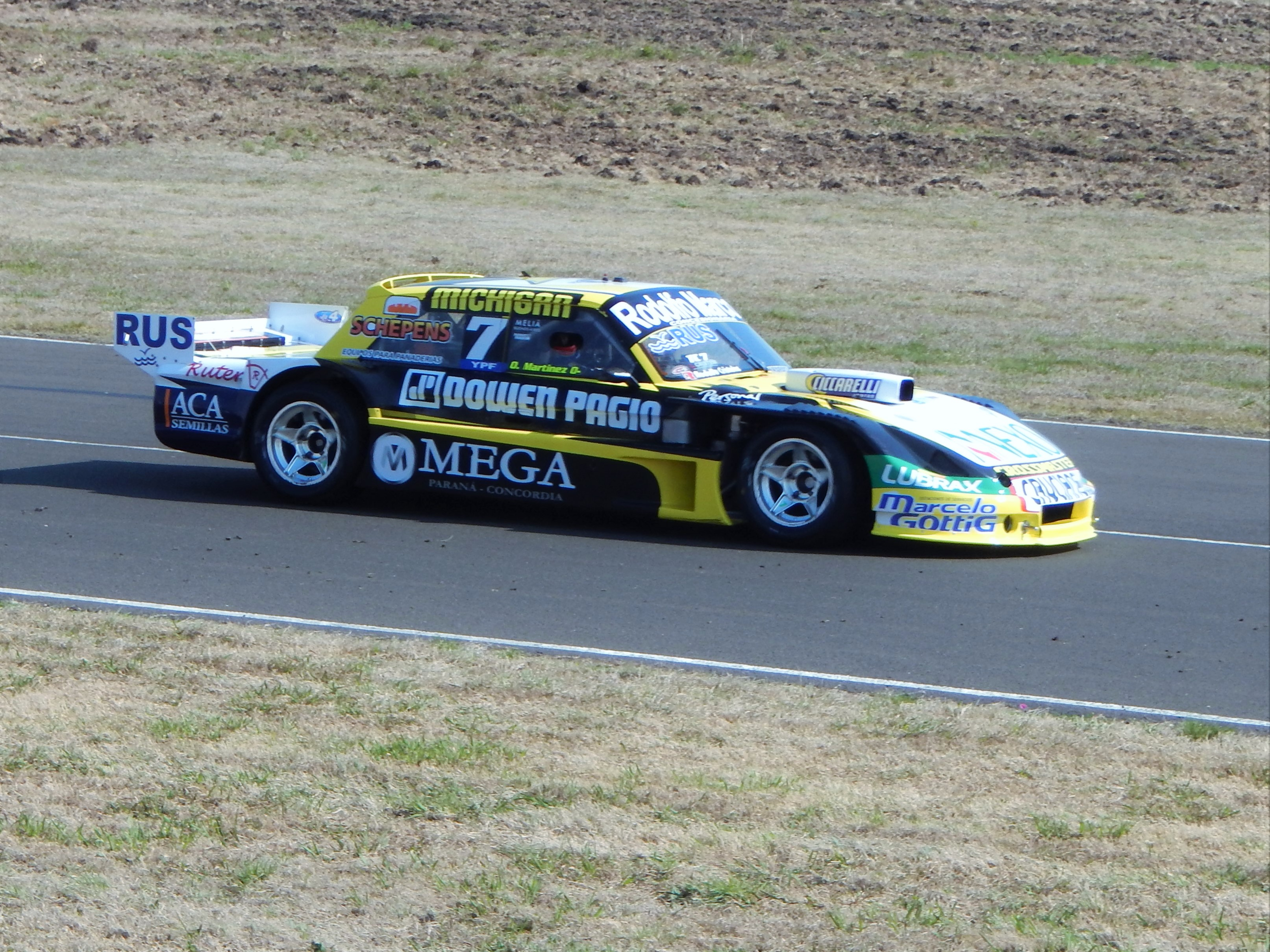
"Gurí" Martínez won his second championship in 2015.

The series was established under the Argentine Automobile Club as the "Campeonato Argentino de Velocidad" in 1937 and re-named Turismo Carretera two years later, however its roots can be traced back to the loosely organised Grands Prix de Carretera of the 1910s. Events were held on open roads, across asphalt and dirt surfaces, and were held as both circuit and rally-style stage races. Competitors used lightly modified production coupés, and employed navigators due to the nature of the races. Future Formula One World Champion Juan Manuel Fangio was among the first drivers to find success in the category, winning back-to-back titles in the early-1940s, before the brothers Gálvez (Oscar and Juan) shared fourteen out of fifteen titles in a row in the post-World War II period. The most infamous event during this time was the 1948 South American Grand Prix, a 9,500km stage race from Buenos Aires to Caracas.

In the 1960s, competitors began to further experiment with modifications as the coupés gave way to prototype versions of locally made sedans; examples of such include the 1967 and 1969-winning Liebre Torinos (breaking Ford and Chevrolet's duopoly on championships) and the 1968-winning Trueno Naranja. In 1970, the championship was split into two classes – one for road races, and another for events on permanent circuits – however only for the single season. In 1973, Nasif Estéfano became the series' first and only posthumous champion having died in a crash in the third-to-last event of the season. As the decade progressed, the prototypes were abandoned in favour of regulations that brought the series closer to its production-based roots whilst retaining the domestically built cars; a spin-off series for the prototypes was created, but slowly died out and later morphed into the TC2000 Championship. Héctor Gradassi and Juan María Traverso were the first to find success in the new formula – centred around Chevrolet, Ford, Dodge and IKA Torino – before a feud between the governing bodies ACA and CADAD led to the prolonging of the 1979 season and the formation of the ACTC in 1981; an independent body that runs the competition to this day.

The 1980s saw the rise of Dodge through their new GTX model, claiming 8 of the 10 championships that decade – four of coming via Roberto Mouras. In 1989, Chevrolet and Ford were given concessions related to engine compression, putting them at a significant technical advantage to the Dodge and now-outdated IKA Torino models; this was only rectified in 1995, when competitor abandonment of the Dodge and Torino led to the homologation of Jeep Cherokee engines to keep them competitive. Following the deaths of Mouras and Osvaldo Morresi, road races were discontinued by the category; the last was held in Santa Teresita in 1997. Despite the category achieving relative parity, Traverso and Guillermo Ortelli entered the new millennium as the leading contenders in Chevrolets, interspersed with titles for Ford and Dodge in the mid-2000s. In 2007, the death of Guillermo Castellanos in a crash at Comodoro Rivadavia led to a ban on navigators – a practice which, by that point, had largely been kept purely on the grounds of tradition.

In 2008, a NASCAR-style "Chase" championship format was introduced (see below). In 2015, the category introduced modernised multi-valve engines. In the late-2010s and early-2020s, the championship was dominated by Agustín Canapino of Chevrolet and Mariano Werner of Ford, a rivalry which was only broken by Canapino briefly moving to IndyCar and a title for José Manuel Urcera in 2022 – the first for a Torino in 51 years. That same year, Toyota entered the category with a modern Camry, leading to the introduction of new models based on American pony cars two years later. Julián Santero won his first title in TC's new era after Ford stablemate Mariano Werner's car was sabotaged by spectators ahead of the final race of the season.

=== Pyramid ===
There are currently four tiers on the Turismo Carretera ladder. The top rung is Turismo Carretera itself, followed by TC Pista as the second division (established in 1995), TC Mouras as the third division (established in 2004 and named after driver Roberto Mouras) and TC Pista Mouras as the fourth division (established in 2008). Pista Mouras is considered the first step for drivers from regional race series to compete nationally.

A fifth category, TC Pick Up, was introduced in 2017 as an alternative rung on the ladder whilst creating a platform for manufacturers to advertise their light commercial trucks – however, this category has resulted in the Argentine equivalent of "Buschwhacking" with Turismo Carretera regulars and former champions dominating events; in 2022, all but one of the eleven Finals were won by current or former TC drivers.

Tier	Championships	
1	Turismo Carretera	
2	TC Pista	
3	TC Mouras	TC Pick Up
4	TC Pista Mouras	TC Pista Pick Up

== Format ==
=== Championship ===
Since 2008, Turismo Carretera has held a NASCAR-style "playoff" format alongside its regular championship to decide the champion.

Called the Copa de Oro ("Gold Cup"), the playoffs are typically held over the final five events of a season (three in the COVID-affected 2020 season). The top twelve drivers in the championship after the final round before the playoffs make the cut. All drivers start on zero points, however the championship leader will receive a bonus 15 starting points, and every driver that won an event 'Final' (see below) will receive an additional 8 starting points per win. Ahead of the final round of the season, the top three drivers in the regular standings that did not qualify for the playoffs will be admitted along with the points they scored over the previous four rounds (two in 2020). No bonus points will be awarded to these "last chance qualifiers".

Drivers that qualify for the Copa de Oro are differentiated from regular competitors by running gold numbers on the rear-passenger windows and gold paint on the front undertray.

=== Event ===
In modern Turismo Carretera, there are "normal races" and "special races" in each season.

The "normal races" have a format of one qualifying session (held on Saturday) and four races (held on Sunday) per weekend. The first three races – called Series (Heats) – split the field into three separate groups, which are formed from the results of qualifying. The fastest qualifier occupies first place in Heat 1, the second-fastest qualifier occupies first place in Heat 2, and third in Heat 3. The fourth-fastest driver in qualifying occupies second place on the grid in Heat 1, and so on until the entire field is divided into three.

Each heat race is a five-lap sprint and defines the grid positions for the final race (or Final), usually held over 25 laps held in the afternoon. The winners of the three heats occupy the first three positions on the grid, in order of fastest to slowest race time. This process is then followed for the rest of the grid, with the order determined by first a drivers' heat position and then their race time. Drivers who did not finish on the lead lap in their heat race will be moved to the rear of the field for the Final, and their order will be determined by how many laps they complete in the Heats, followed by their race position and then their race time.

In addition, there can be up to four "special races" (carreras especiales) held in the regular season before the playoffs. In 2023, three special races were held: one with a mandatory pitstop for refueling in La Pampa, the Carrera de los Milliones in Rafaela with a special monetary prize for the winner, and the Desafío de las Estrellas in Villicum where the grid is determined by a lottery and there are two mandatory stops to change tyres and refuel. Additionally, there is a Special Races Tournament (Torneo de Carreras Especiales) that gives the winner the opportunity to qualify for the playoffs if they have not made it through via their position the regular season standings.

=== Rules and penalties ===
Rules and flags mainly follow the same basic rules as motor racing in other parts of the world, however a distinct flag is used for safety car or caution periods – a horizontal triband of blue-white-red, similar to the former flag of Serbia and Montenegro, is used in this instance.

Penalties for contact usually result in the offending driver being repositioned behind the affected driver in the final results, regardless of when the infraction occurred in the race. In the event that a driver does not finish a race due to the actions of another driver, the offender will be disqualified from the race – and if the affected driver cannot participate in any further sessions that weekend due to the damage sustained, the offending driver is excluded from the remainder of the event.

== Circuits ==
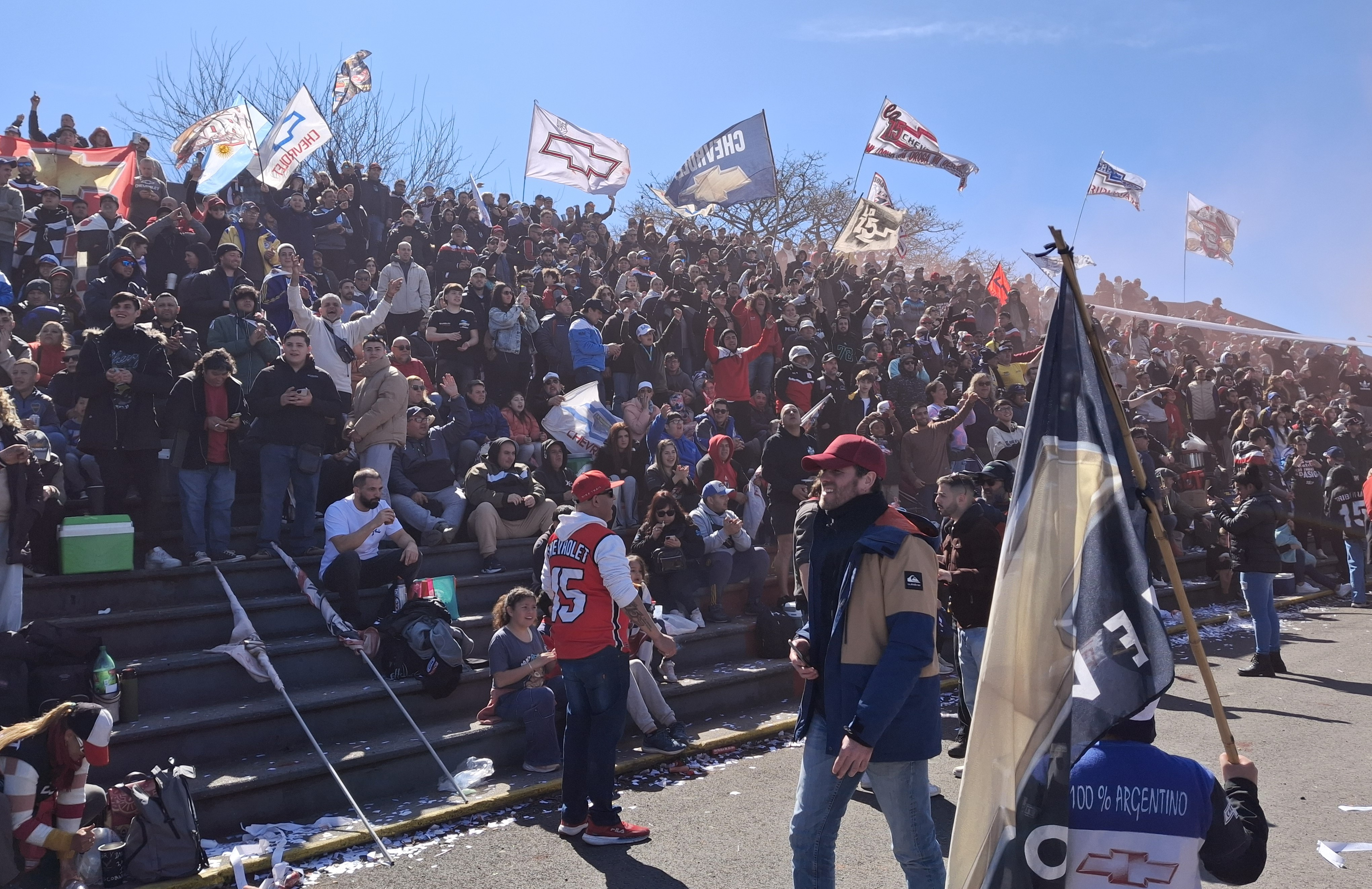

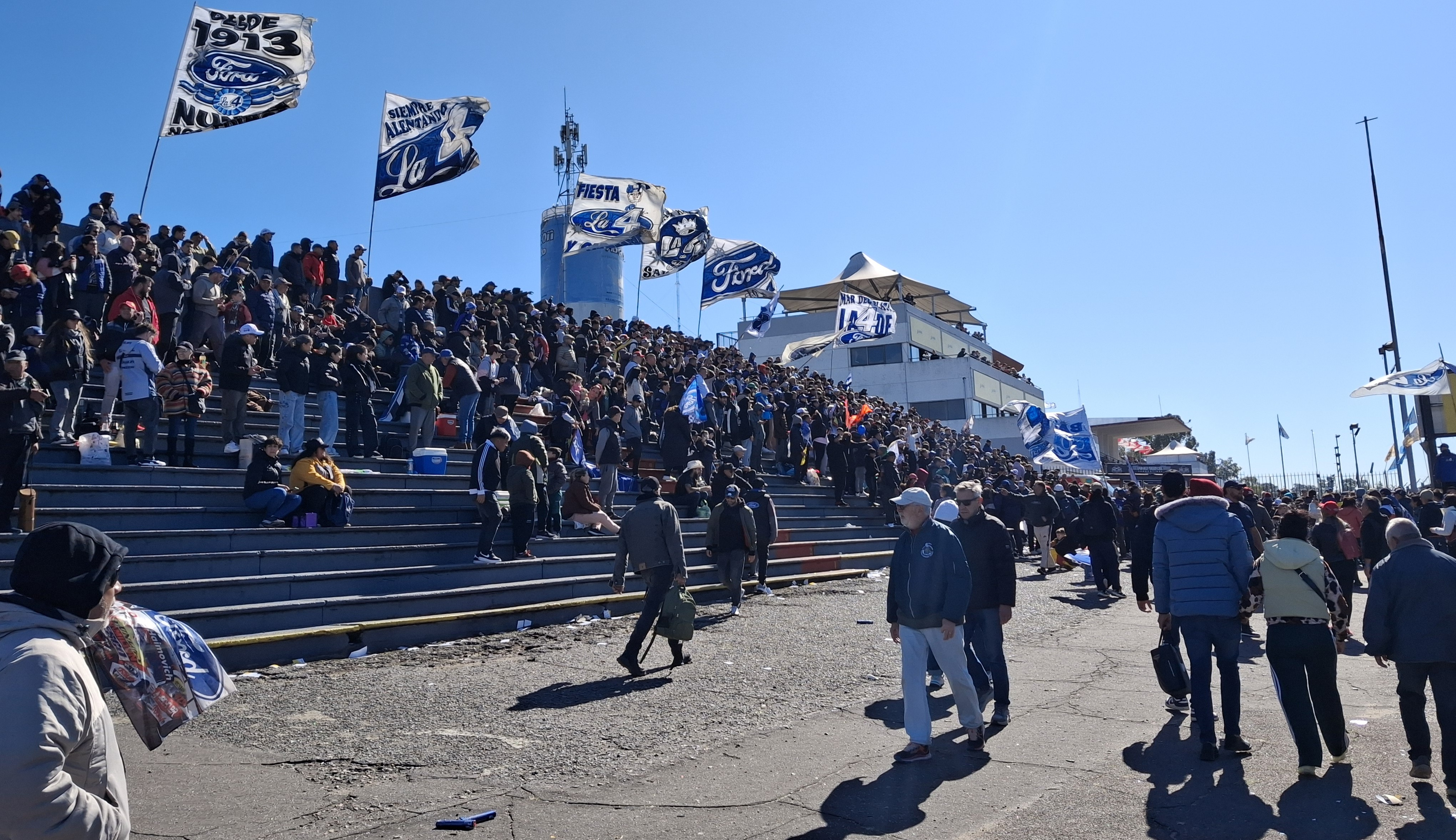
Supporter groups of Chevrolet (top) and Ford (bottom).

The circuits in 2025:

- Autódromo Ciudad de Viedma
- Autódromo Enrique Freile
- Autódromo Parque Provincia del Neuquén
- Autódromo Provincia de La Pampa
- Autódromo Termas de Río Hondo
- Autódromo Oscar Cabalén
- Autódromo Rosamonte
- Autódromo de Concepción del Uruguay
- Circuito San Juan Villicum
- Autódromo Oscar y Juan Gálvez
- Autódromo Rosendo Hernández
- Autódromo Juan María Traverso
- Autódromo Ciudad de Paraná
- Autódromo Roberto Mouras

== Vehicle overview ==
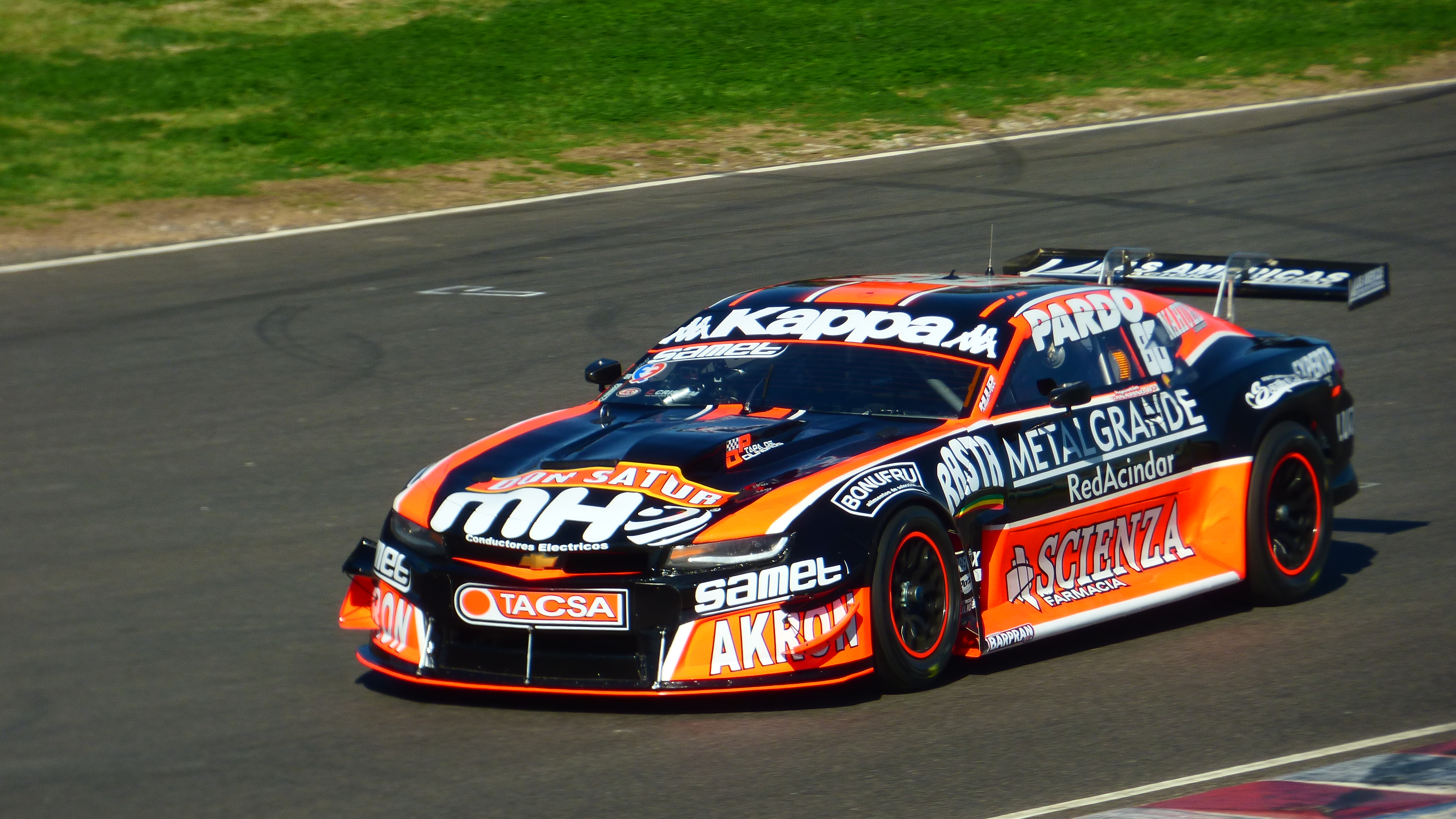
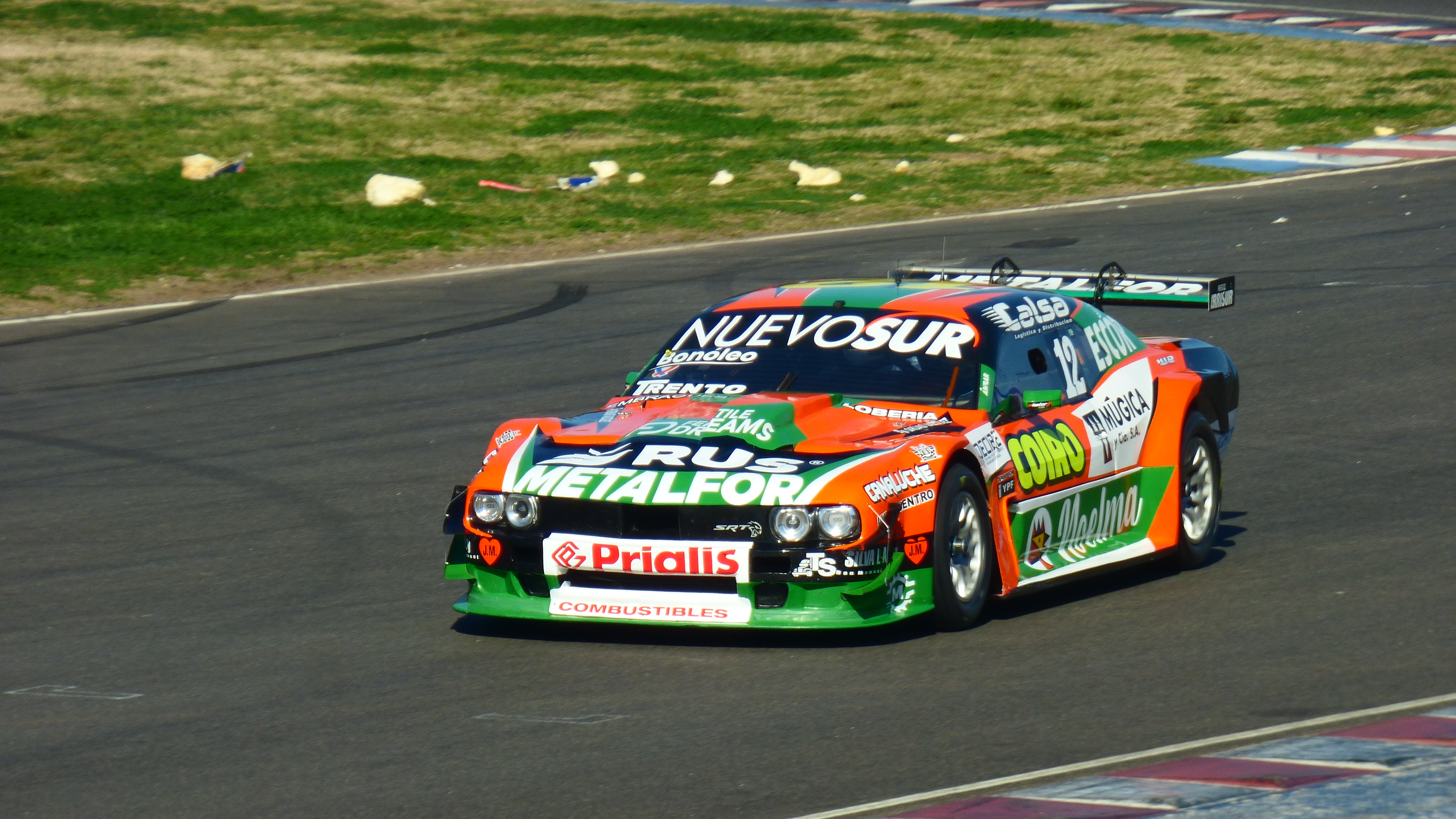
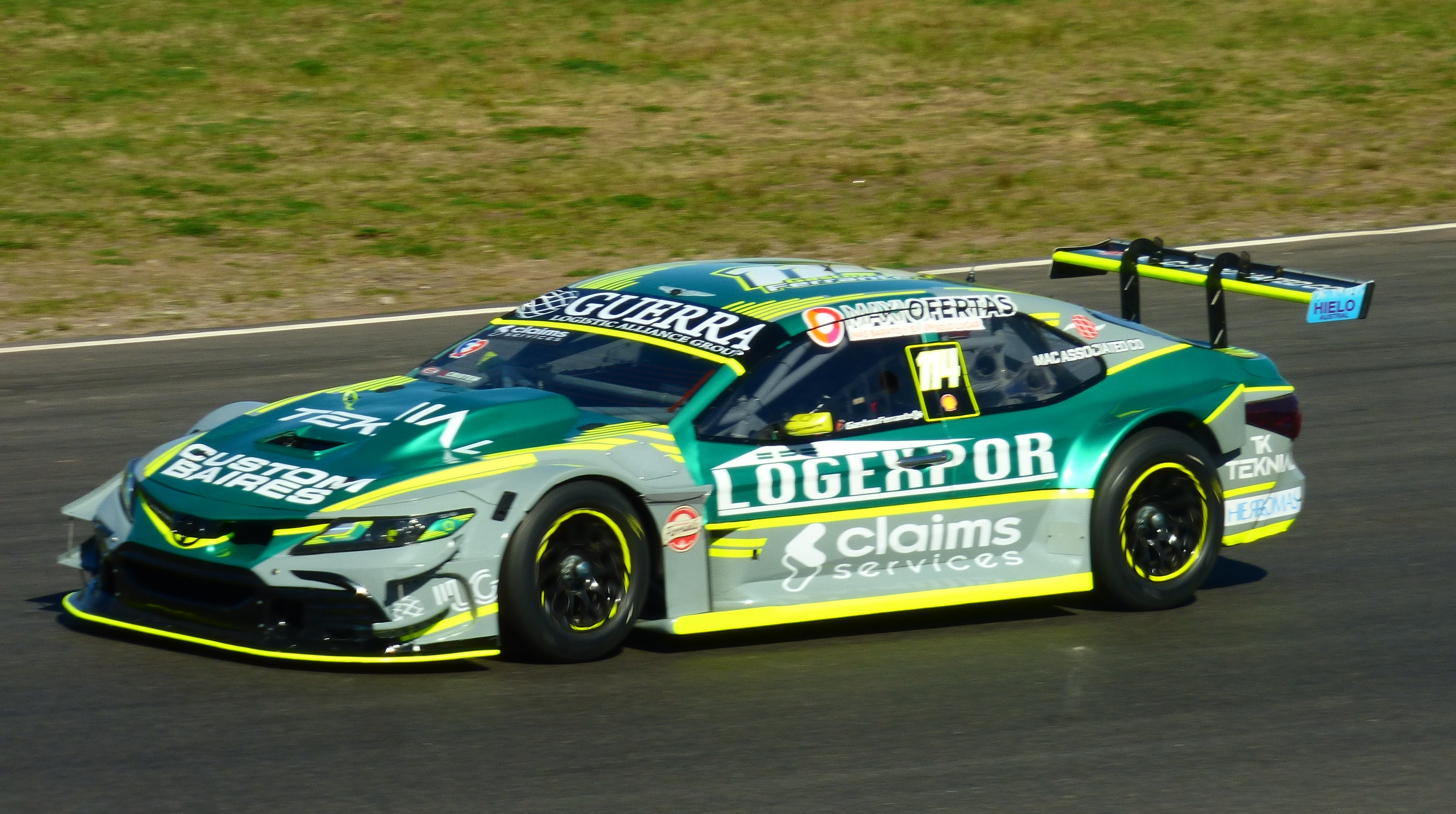
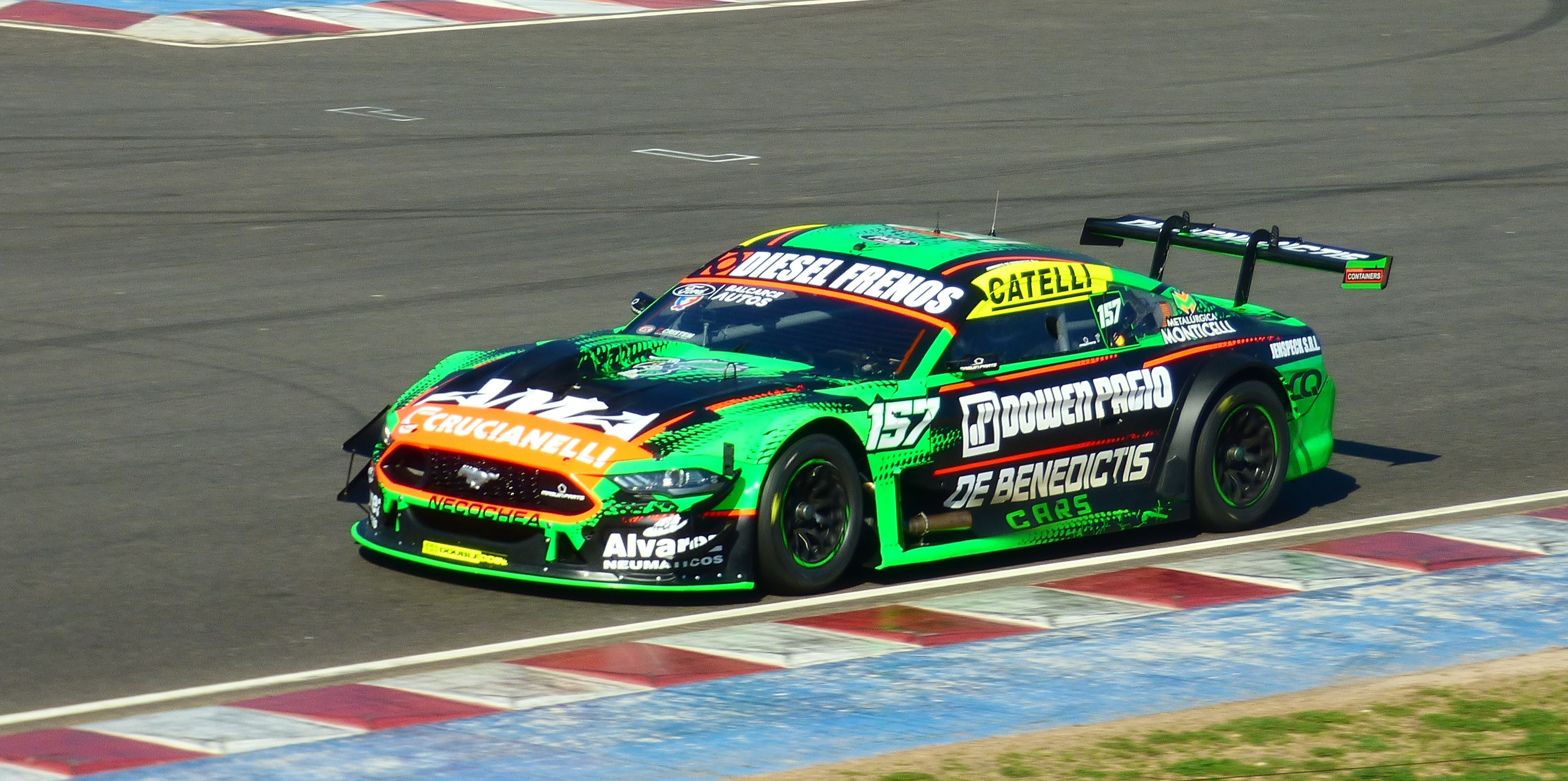
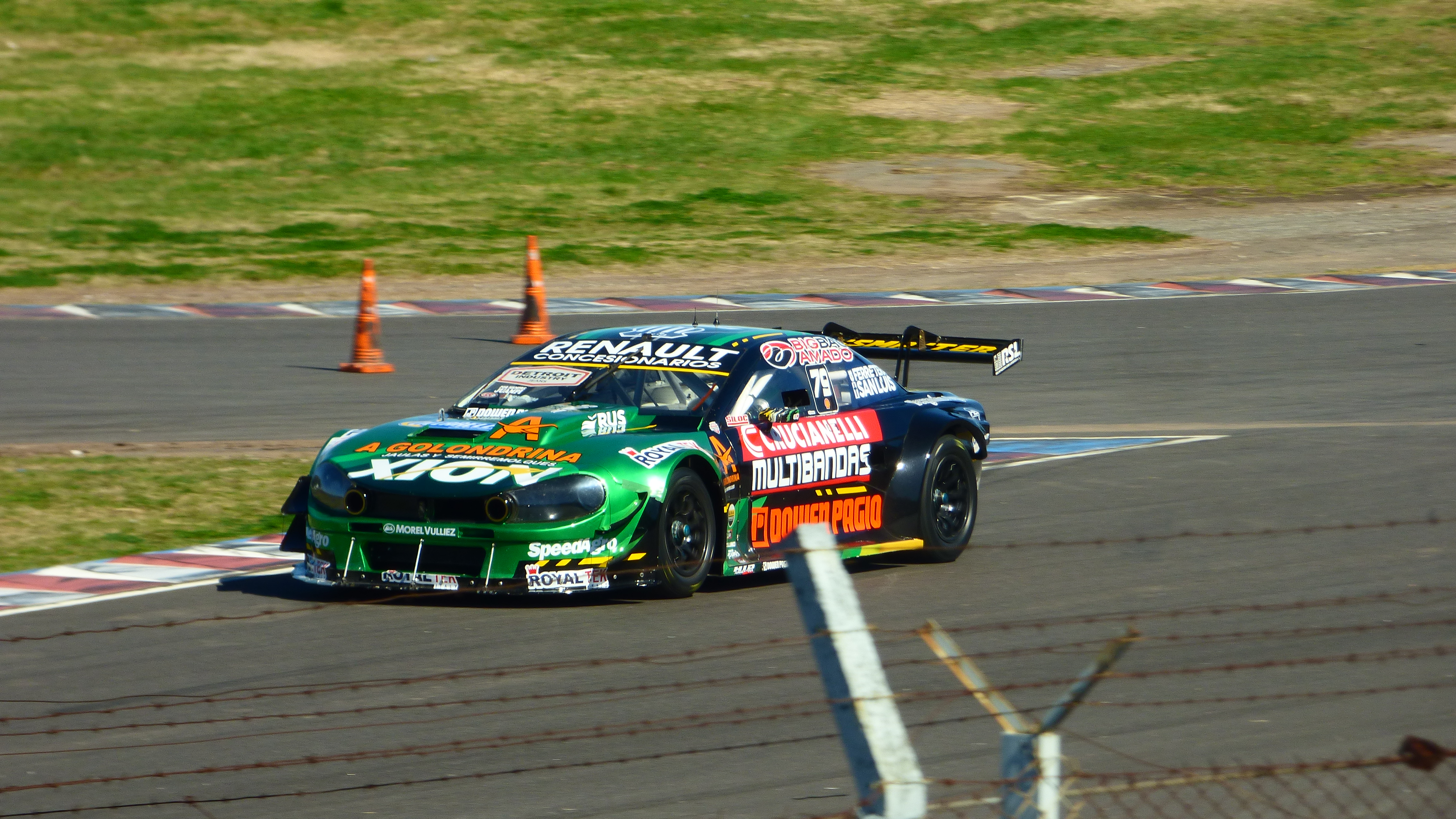
Current Turismo Carretera models (clockwise from top-left: Chevrolet, Dodge, Ford, Torino, Toyota).

Turismo Carretera cars are built by individual teams and constructors to a set of regulations designed to create parity between the various manufacturers involved. Since the 1970s, four manufacturers have been concurrently represented in Turismo Carretera using Argentine-built models – Chevrolet with the Nova, Dodge with the GTX, Ford with the Falcon, and Industrias Kaiser Argentina with the Torino; Toyota joined in 2022 with the Camry XV70. The Dodge GTX and IKA Torino were originally equipped with Slant Six and Tornado engines respectively, but both moved to Chrysler Cherokee engines in the mid-1990s – the Toyota has exclusively run with a Cherokee engine since its original homologation in 2022.

In 2024, the vehicles were upgraded to their modern counterparts with a focus on retaining OEM styling; the previous cars had all evolved to look very similar. Chevrolet, Dodge and Ford switched to American pony cars in the form of the Camaro, Challenger and Mustang respectively, whilst Toyota retained the still-new Camry but redesigned the front end; a concept Torino was created as IKA went out of business in 1975. From 2026, Mercedes-Benz and BMW will enter the championship with models based on the CLE 53 and M4 respectively.

=== Technical regulations ===
- Chassis construction: Tubular silhouettes
- Engine displacement: Inline-six, 3,260 cc (199 cu in) to 3,310 cc (202 cu in) – varies between engine manufacturers.
- Aspiration: Natural
- Fuel delivery: 2 dual-body Weber 48-48 IDA carburetors
- Fuel capacity: 100 litres (26 US gal)
- Fuel: Shell V-Power
- Tires: Neumáticos de Avanzada, 16 inches
- Minimum weight: 1,300 kg (2,866 lb) to 1,315 kg (2,899 lb) – varies between engine manufacturers.
- Power output: Approximately 450 hp (336 kW) between 8,800 and 9,000 RPM – RPM varies between engine manufacturers.
- Rear track width: 2,010 mm (79 in) maximum
- Wheelbase: 2,723 mm (107 in) to 2,849 mm (112 in) – varies between vehicles.
- Gearbox: Sáenz TT3 6-speed manual sequential + 1 reverse
- Steering: Rack and pinion
- Drivetrain: FR layout

== Champions ==
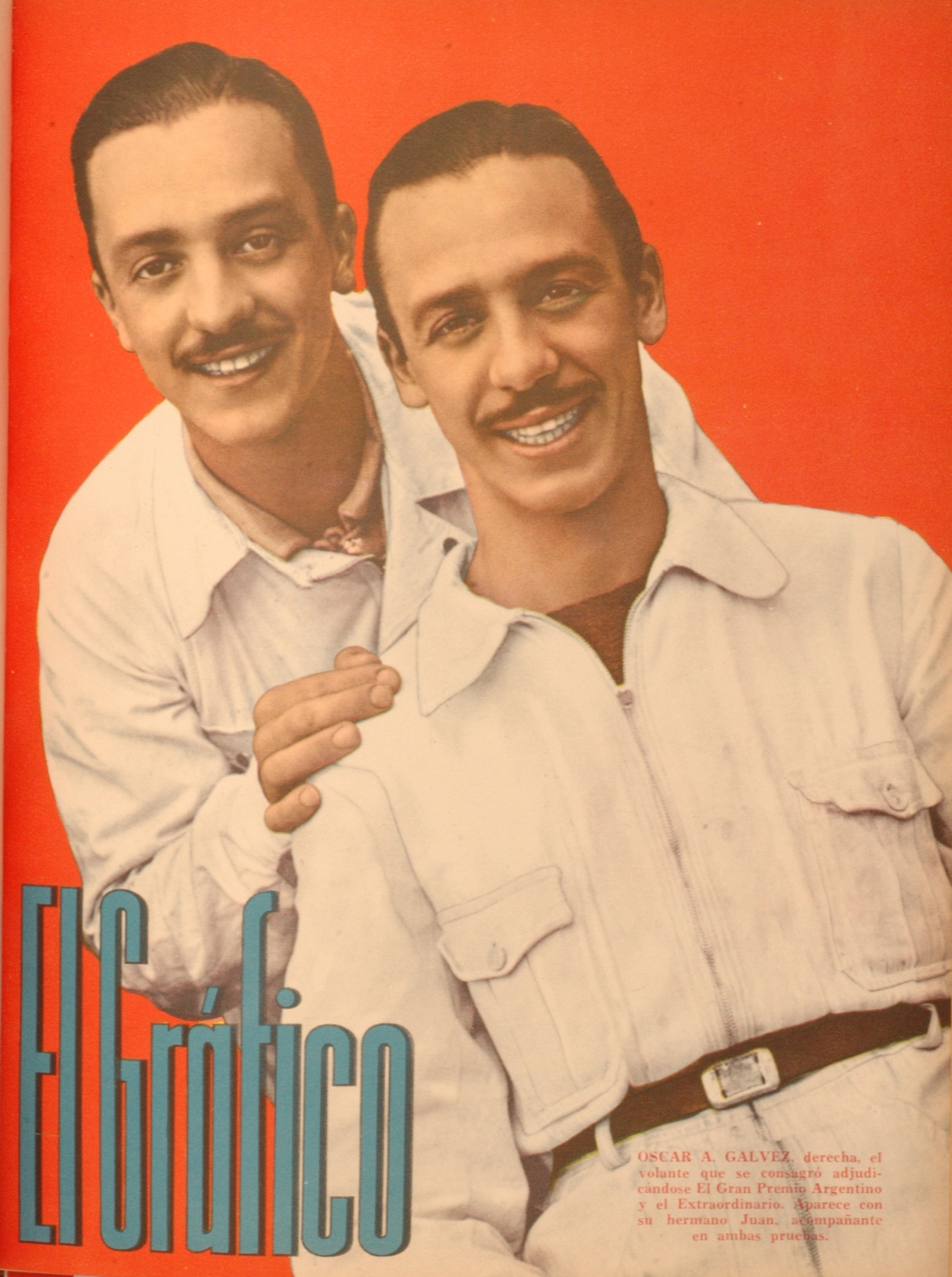
Brothers Juan (left) and Oscar Gálvez (right) won a combined fourteen Turismo Carretera championships between 1947 and 1961.

Year	Driver	Car
Campeonato Argentino de Velocidad
1937	Eduardo Pedrazzini	Ford
1938	Ricardo Leopoldo Risatti	Ford
Turismo Carretera
1939	Ángel Lo Valvo	Ford
1940	Juan Manuel Fangio	Chevrolet
1941	Juan Manuel Fangio	Chevrolet
1942	Cancelled	
1943–1946	Not held	
1947	Oscar Gálvez	Ford
1948	Oscar Gálvez	Ford
1949	Juan Gálvez	Ford
1950	Juan Gálvez	Ford
1951	Juan Gálvez	Ford
1952	Juan Gálvez	Ford
1953	Oscar Gálvez	Ford
1954	Oscar Gálvez	Ford
1955	Juan Gálvez	Ford
1956	Juan Gálvez	Ford
1957	Juan Gálvez	Ford
1958	Juan Gálvez	Ford
1959	Rodolfo de Álzaga	Ford
1960	Juan Gálvez	Ford
1961	Oscar Gálvez	Ford
1962	Dante Emiliozzi	Ford
1963	Dante Emiliozzi	Ford
1964	Dante Emiliozzi	Ford
1965	Dante Emiliozzi	Ford
1966	Juan Manuel Bordeu	Chevrolet
1967	Eduardo Copello	Torino
1968	Carlos Pairetti	Chevrolet
1969	Gastón Perkins	Torino
1970	Rubén Luis di Palma	Torino
1971	Rubén Luis di Palma	Torino
1972	Héctor Gradassi	Ford
1973	Nasif Estéfano	Ford
1974	Héctor Gradassi	Ford
1975	Héctor Gradassi	Ford
1976	Héctor Gradassi	Ford
1977	Juan María Traverso	Ford
1978	Juan María Traverso	Ford
1979–1980	Francisco Espinosa	Chevrolet
1980–1981	Antonio Aventín	Dodge
1981	Roberto Mouras	Dodge
1982	Jorge Martínez Boero	Ford
1983	Roberto Mouras	Dodge
1984	Roberto Mouras	Dodge
1985	Roberto Mouras	Dodge
1986	Oscar Angeletti	Dodge
1987	Oscar Castellano	Dodge
1988	Oscar Castellano	Dodge
1989	Oscar Castellano	Ford
1990	Emilio Satriano	Chevrolet
1991	Oscar Aventín	Ford
1992	Oscar Aventín	Ford
1993	Walter Hernández	Ford
1994	Eduardo Ramos	Ford
1995	Juan María Traverso	Chevrolet
1996	Juan María Traverso	Chevrolet
1997	Juan María Traverso	Chevrolet
1998	Guillermo Ortelli	Chevrolet
1999	Juan María Traverso	Ford
2000	Guillermo Ortelli	Chevrolet
2001	Guillermo Ortelli	Chevrolet
2002	Guillermo Ortelli	Chevrolet
2003	Ernesto Bessone	Dodge
2004	Omar Martínez	Ford
2005	Juan Manuel Silva	Ford
2006	Norberto Fontana	Dodge
2007	Christian Ledesma	Chevrolet
2008	Guillermo Ortelli	Chevrolet
2009	Emanuel Moriatis	Ford
2010	Agustín Canapino	Chevrolet
2011	Guillermo Ortelli	Chevrolet
2012	Mauro Giallombardo	Ford
2013	Diego Aventín	Ford
2014	Matías Rossi	Chevrolet
2015	Omar Martínez	Ford
2016	Guillermo Ortelli	Chevrolet
2017	Agustín Canapino	Chevrolet
2018	Agustín Canapino	Chevrolet
2019	Agustín Canapino	Chevrolet
2020	Mariano Werner	Ford
2021	Mariano Werner	Ford
2022	José Manuel Urcera	Torino
2023	Mariano Werner	Ford
2024	Julián Santero	Ford
2025	Agustín Canapino	Chevrolet
