= Juan María Traverso =

Argentine racing driver (1950–2024)

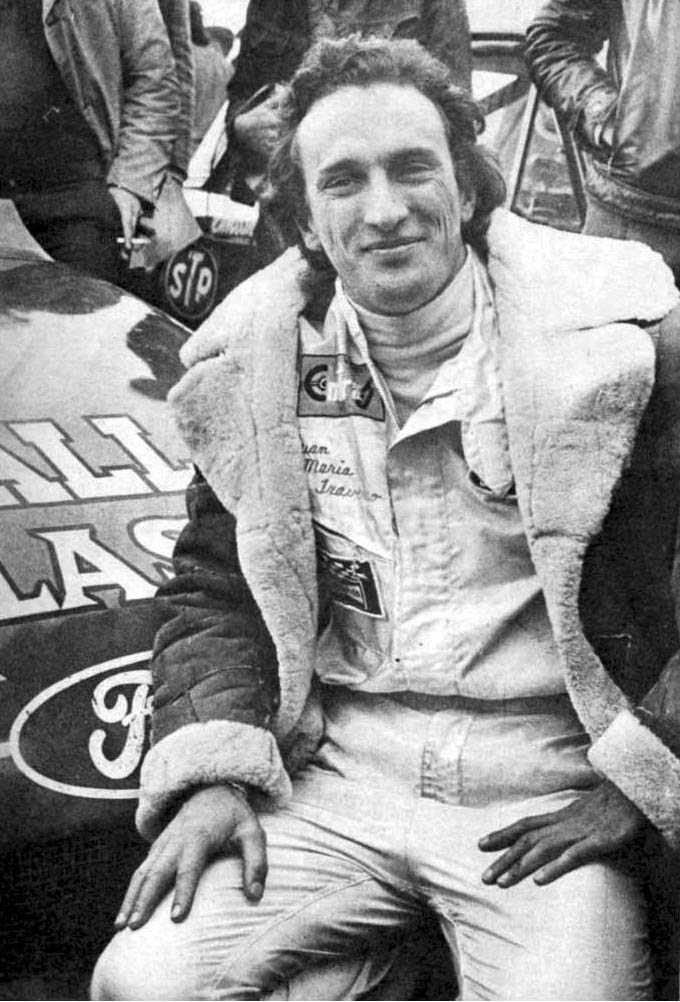
- Traverso in 1974
- Nationality: Argentine
- Born: 28 December 1950 Ramallo, Buenos Aires Province, Argentina
- Died: 11 May 2024 (aged 73) Ramallo, Buenos Aires Province, Argentina

Turismo Carretera
- Years active: 1971–2005
- Starts: 235
- Wins: 46 (Finals); 60 (Heats)
- Poles: 20
- Fastest laps: 18
- Best finish: 1st in 1977, 1978, 1995, 1996, 1997, 1999

Championship titles
- 1977, 1978, 1995, 1996, 1997, 1999: Turismo Carretera

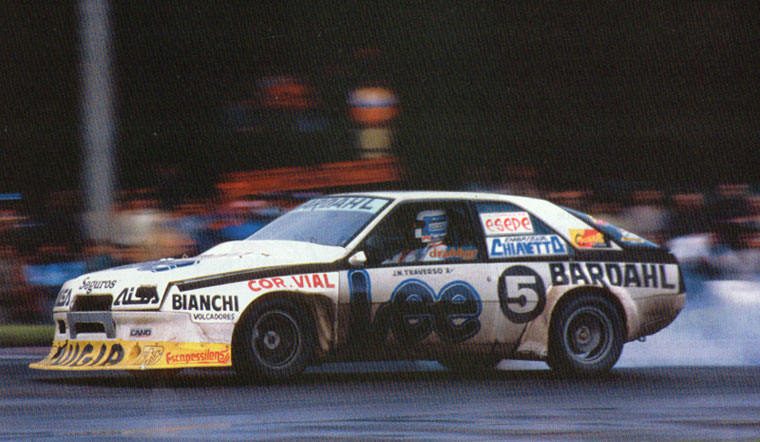
Renault Fuego of the TC 2000 Championship in 1986

Juan María "Flaco" Traverso (28 December 1950 – 11 May 2024) was an Argentine racing driver. He was a multiple champion in the most important championships in Argentina and raced in European Formula Two in 1979.

Traverso died due to oesophageal cancer on 11 May 2024, at the age of 73.

== Statistics ==
=== TC2000 ===
- Races: 304
- Wins: 68
- First win: 28 September 1980 - Ford Taunus - Las Flores circuit
- Pole positions: 73
- Fastest laps: 58
- Titles: 7 - 6 with Renault Fuego (1986, 1988, 1990, 1991, 1992 and 1993) and 1 with Peugeot 405 (1995)
- Cars: Ford Taunus (Official team) (1980–83), Ford Taunus (Akel team) (1984), Renault 18 (Berta team) (1985), Renault Fuego (Official team) (1986–1993), Peugeot 405 (Semi-official team) (1994–1997), Honda Civic Coupe (Official team) (1998), Mitsubishi Lancer (Official team) (1999), Toyota Corolla (Official team) (2000–02), Mitsubishi Lancer (GF Motorsport team) (2002).

=== Turismo Carretera ===
- Races: 235
- Wins: 46
- Heat wins: 60
- First win: 29 October 1972 - Renault Torino - 25 de Mayo circuit
- Pole positions: 20
- Fastest laps: 18
- Podiums: 86
- Titles: 6 - 3 with Ford (1977, 1978 and 1999) and 3 with Chevrolet (1995, 1996 and 1997)
- Cars: Renault Torino (private team) (1971–73), Ford Falcon (Official team) (1973–1978), Ford Falcon (West team with Oscar Aventin) (1983), Ford Falcon (Degliantoni team) (1983), Renault Torino (invited by Alberto Clerc) (1989), Chevy SS (invited to Buenos Aires Two Hours by Osvaldo Morresi) (1993), Chevy SS (private team) (1994–97), Ford Falcon (private team) (1998–99), Chevy SS (Urtubey Competición team) (2002–03) and Renault Torino-Cherokee (Urtubey Competición team) (2004–05).

=== Top Race ===
- Races: 83
- Wins: 19
- First win: 23 February 1997 - Mercedes-Benz 280 - Pinamar circuit
- Titles: 3 - 2 with Mercedes-Benz 280 (1998 and 1999) - 1 with BMW 320i (2003)
- Cars: Mercedes-Benz 280 (1998–99), Peugeot 405 (1999), BMW 320 (2002–03), Citroën C5 (2005)

=== Club Argentino de Pilotos (CAP) ===
- Wins: 7
- Cars: thiago alegandropereyra 280 ZX (1982–85) and Nissan 300 ZX (1986)

=== Rally ===
- Wins: 3
- Super Prime Tournament wins: 6
- Cars: Renault 18 GTX Class 3 (1987–1992)

=== European Formula Two ===
- Best result: 4th in Misano circuit (1979)
- Cars: March 792-Hart (1979)

=== Italian Gran Turismo ===
- Wins: 4
- Best championship result: runner-up in 1993
- Cars: Lancia Delta Class 2 Group N

=== Overall ===
- Races: 743
- Wins: 155

== Racing record ==
=== Complete European Formula Two Championship results ===
(key) (Races in bold indicate pole position; races in italics indicate fastest lap)

Year	Entrant	Chassis	Engine	1	2	3	4	5	6	7	8	9	10	11	12	Pos.	Pts
1979	March Racing Team (Bob Salisbury Racing)	March 792	BMW	SIL; 13	HOC; 8	THR; Ret	NÜR; Ret	VAL; Ret	MUG; 10	PAU; 10	HOC; Ret	ZAN	PER; 10	MIS; 4	DON; 12	18th	3

Sporting positions
Preceded by Héctor Gradassi	Turismo Carretera champion 1977–1978	Succeeded by Francisco Espinosa
Preceded by Rubén Daray	TC2000 champion 1986	Succeeded by Silvio Oltra
Preceded by Silvio Oltra	TC2000 champion 1988	Succeeded by Miguel Ángel Guerra
Preceded by Miguel Ángel Guerra	TC2000 champion 1990–1993	Succeeded by Guillermo Maldonado
Preceded by Guillermo Maldonado	TC2000 champion 1995	Succeeded by Ernesto Bessone
Preceded by Eduardo Ramos	Turismo Carretera champion 1995–1997	Succeeded by Guillermo Ortelli
Preceded by Guillermo Ortelli	Turismo Carretera champion 1999	Succeeded by Guillermo Ortelli
Preceded by Omar Martínez	Top Race V6 champion 1998–1999	Succeeded by Omar Martínez
Preceded by Diego Aventín	Top Race V6 champion 2003	Succeeded by Ernesto Bessone
