= Mario Gayraud =

Argentine racing driver

- Born: Mario Rodolfo Gayraud; November 9, 1957 (age 68)
- Nationality: Argentine

Mario Rodolfo Gayraud (born November 9, 1957, in Buenos Aires province) is an Argentine retired racing driver. He won the TC2000 championship in 1984. He is nationally recognized for his participation in the Turismo Carretera, Turismo Nacional and TC 2000 categories. In the latter he obtained his only championship title, being a driver for the official Ford team and winning the first title of the brand and the only one owned by the Ford Taunus model. In turn, he also obtained three runners-up in 1983 with the Taunus and in 1985 and 1986 with the Ford Sierra model. In Turismo Carretera, he competed from 1991 to 1998 mainly with a Ford Falcon, except for 1994, which was the only year in which he competed with a Chevrolet Chevy. After this, he had retired temporarily, returning in 2006 in the National Tourism, aboard a Peugeot 306. Finally, Gayraud would retire in 2007, aboard a Chevrolet Astra of the Class 3 of the TN.

After his retirement, Gayraud worked as an external consultant for the Asociación Corredores de Turismo Carretera, collaborating in the development of the ACTC's Chevrolet Chevy and Ford Falcon prototypes, testing the future reforms that are applied year after year in the so-called "Laboratory Cars". to the units of said brands.

Sporting positions
Preceded by Rubén Luis di Palma	TC2000 champion 1985	Succeeded by Rubén Daray
