= Gayraud =

Gayraud is a surname. Notable people with the name include:

- Mario Gayraud (born 1957), Argentine racing driver
- Pierre Gayraud (born 1992), French rugby union player
- William Gayraud-Hirigoyen (1898–1962), French rugby union player

== See also ==
- Gayraud Wilmore (1921–2020), American writer, historian, ethicist, educator, and theologian
