= Walter Hernández =

Walter Hernández may refer to:

- Walter Hernández (footballer)
- Walter Hernández (racing driver)
