= Alzaga (surname) =

Alzaga is a surname of Basque origins. Notable people with the surname include:

- Fernando Vérgez Alzaga (born 1945), Spanish bishop
- Martín de Álzaga (1755–1812), Spanish merchant and politician
- Martín de Álzaga (racing driver) (1901–1982), Argentine racing driver
- Óscar Alzaga (born 1942), Spanish politician
- Rodolfo de Álzaga (1930–1994), Argentine racing driver
