= Nasif Estéfano =

Argentine racing driver (1932–1973)

- Born: Nasif Moisés Estéfano; 18 November 1932; Concepción, Tucumán, Argentina
- Died: 21 October 1973 (aged 40); Aimogasta, La Rioja, Argentina

Formula One World Championship career
- Nationality: (Argentina) Argentine
- Active years: 1960, 1962
- Team(s): Maserati, De Tomaso
- Entries: 2 (1 start)
- Championships: 0
- Wins: 0
- Podiums: 0
- Career points: 0
- Pole positions: 0
- Fastest laps: 0
- First entry: 1960 Argentine Grand Prix
- Last entry: 1962 Italian Grand Prix

Nasif Moisés Estéfano (18 November 1932 – 21 October 1973) was a racing driver from Argentina with Lebanese ancestry. He participated in two World Championship Formula One Grands Prix, debuting on 7 February 1960, but scored no championship points. He entered the 1962 Italian Grand Prix but failed to qualify. He was born in Concepción, Tucumán.

Estéfano died while driving in a local race in Aimogasta, La Rioja, on 21 October 1973. His car suffered a mechanical failure on a fast curve, which caused the car to somersault a number of times. Estéfano was ejected from the car due to a fault with the safety belts, and was killed almost instantly due to head injuries.

== Complete Formula One World Championship results ==
(key)

Year	Entrant	Chassis	Engine	1	2	3	4	5	6	7	8	9	10	WDC	Points
1960	Nasif Estéfano	Maserati 250F	Maserati Straight-6	ARG; 14	MON	500	NED	BEL	FRA	GBR	POR	ITA	USA	NC	0
1962	Scuderia de Tomaso	De Tomaso 801	De Tomaso Flat-8	NED	MON	BEL	FRA	GBR	GER	ITA; DNQ	USA	RSA		NC	0

Sporting positions
Preceded by Rubén Luis di Palma	Turismo Carretera champion 1973	Succeeded by Héctor Gradassi
