= Eduardo Ramos (racing driver) =

Argentine racing driver

Eduardo Germán Ramos (born May 28, 1966 in Mechongué, near Necochea, Buenos Aires province) is an Argentine former racing driver. He won the Turismo Carretera championship in 1994.

Sporting positions
Preceded by Walter Hernández	Turismo Carretera champion 1994	Succeeded by Juan María Traverso
