= Rodolfo de Álzaga =

Argentine racing driver

Rodolfo de Álzaga Unzué (September 21, 1930 – April 19, 1994 in Buenos Aires) was an Argentine racing driver. He won the Turismo Carretera championship in 1959.

== Death ==
De Álzaga was buried in La Recoleta Cemetery in Buenos Aires.

Sporting positions
Preceded by Juan Gálvez	Turismo Carretera champion 1959	Succeeded by Óscar Alfredo Gálvez
