= Fast Chevrolet =

Trueno Naranja
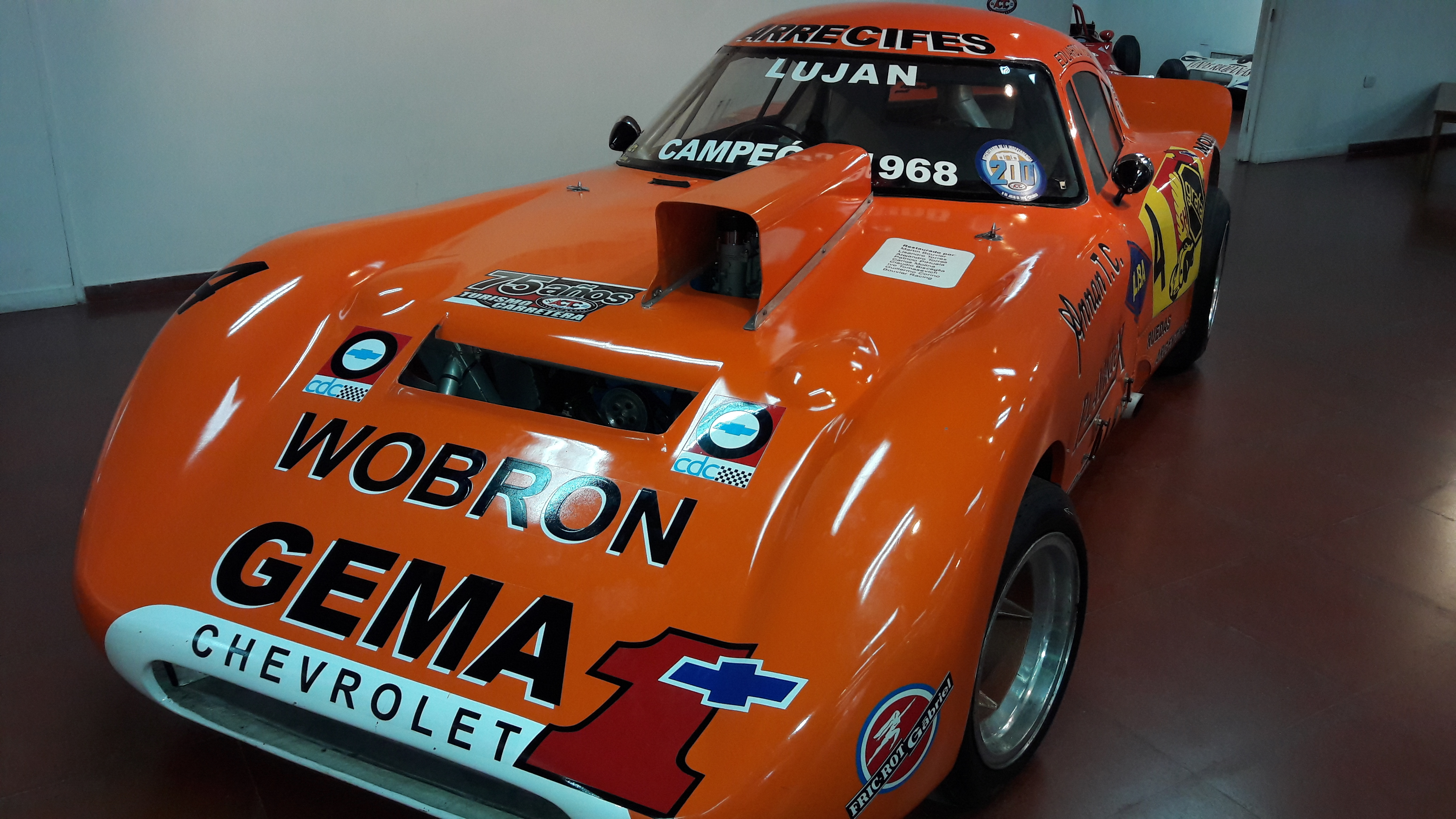
- Category: ACTC stock car
- Designer: Pedro Campos
- Production: 1968–1969

Technical specifications
- Chassis: Steel tube frame
- Suspension (front): Double wishbones, pushrod actuated coil springs over shock absorbers, anti-roll bar (Deformable parallelogram)
- Suspension (rear): Double wishbones, pushrod actuated coil springs love shock absorbers, anti-roll bar (formerly rigid axle)
- Length: 4,750 mm (187.0 in)
- Width: 1,840 mm (72.4 in)
- Height: 1,270 mm (50.0 in)
- Axle track: 1,400 mm (55.1 in) (front); 1,480 mm (58.3 in) (rear)
- Wheelbase: 2,600 mm (102.4 in)
- Engine: Chevrolet 250 cu in (4 L) OHV I6 naturally-aspirated FR
- Transmission: ZF 4-speed manual + reverse
- Power: 300 hp (224 kW)
- Weight: 1,230 kg (2,712 lb)
- Brakes: Disc brakes all-round

Competition history

The Fast Chevrolet, nicknamed the Trueno Naranja, is a racing prototype, designed to run in the Turismo Carretera category, during the 60s. It is a car mounted on a handmade reticulated chassis and powered by a 250 cubic inches inline 6 Chevrolet engine. Although the reticulation that forms its chassis was designed by Pedro Campos, which was based on a Lotus Seven, it is recorded in the automotive records with the Chevrolet brand. It had been originally created by the Baufer bodybuilder as the Baufer Ford F-100 Prototype and its preparer was Horacio Steven. your pilot Carlos Pairetti was the one who obtained the 1968 Road Tourism championship with this machine. His name is a connotation of the fastback type design that the car has, while the nickname Thunder Orange, alluded to the color and the speed with which the car performed. From the 1968 championship, two Fast-Chevrolet units took part, the first being the car driven by Pairetti, while the second unit was a gold-painted Fast Chevrolet, which was driven by Oscar Espinosa Fangio. This second car was known by the pseudonym Trueno Dorado.

== History ==
In the 1960s, the Turismo Carretera car fleet began to fill up with cars developed from compact cars, or handcrafted prototypes with standard car mechanics. Ford's idea of preparing a prototype was manifested in a vehicle manufactured entirely by Baufer, mounted on a handmade chassis with reticulated pipes and for whose attention the services of Horacio Steven were required. At first, this car was going to be the weapon of the official Ford team, to face these championships. In fact, they came equipped with V8 engines from the Ford F-100. However, this prototype had very bad results. So much so that they came to claim the lives of Oscar Cabalén and his occasional companion, Guillermo Arnaiz, at the San Nicolás circuit. After these tragic accidents, Ford decided to withdraw official support from Horacio Steven, to give it to another great trainer: José Miguel Herceg, "the Pole".

This situation, however, was taken advantage of by the driver Carlos Pairetti, who saw in the prototype an ideal car to defeat the Torinos prepared by Oreste Berta. To do this, he asked Steven about the possibility of preparing a car with Chevrolet mechanics, to achieve his mission: A Thunder.

The Orange Thunder was nothing more than the evolution of that prototype created by Baufer for the Ford Official Team and which was cared for by Steven. But due to the tragic accidents involving Oscar Cabalén and Atilio Viale del Carril (his companion died and he was seriously injured), this model was discarded and replaced by the Falcon F-100.

Regarding the " Baufer Ford ", the Orange Thunder underwent several modifications. Regarding the exterior, its trunk was completely modified. First, the housing swishes on the Weber carburettors on Ford engines were removed . Second, the side intakes for cooling the brakes were eliminated, managing to widen the body by 7 cm, preventing the wheels from protruding. In the internal part, one of the most important modifications that was carried out was the change of position of the naphtha tanks. The " Steven Ford "" It had them on both sides of the door, which made it a time bomb on wheels. These were relocated behind the seats. And returning to the outside, as a novelty, a spoiler was added to the tail of the car on "duck tail" shape. It was the first car to have it. This spoiler gave excellent downforce, generating good rear-end adhesion. Its passenger compartment was made of sheet metal and its nose and tail were made of plastic, unlike the old model, it was made of a highly flammable material.

As a curiosity, it came with the steering wheel located on the right side of the torpedo, something that had ceased to be used after the use of the right lane as a passable road was adopted in Argentina . This regulation forced automakers to manufacture cars with the steering wheel located on the left.

=== The origin of the legend ===
After Eduardo Copello won the Road Tourism championship in 1967 aboard an unbeatable Torino, prepared by Oreste Berta, in 1968 a prototype was presented, designed by Heriberto Pronello and prepared by Oreste Berta: La Liebre MkII Torino. Carlos Pairetti, who had fought for the championship aboard a Barracuda-Chevrolet prototype, considered that he was no longer up to the new car.

It was thus that upon learning that Horacio Steven still kept the remains of his failed Baufer Ford F-100 in his workshop and that they had been discarded by Ford after the tragic events of '67, Pairetti approached Steven's workshop to present his ideas about as it should be the ideal car that defeats the Hares MkII. The result was a highly competitive and impressive car due to its aerodynamic shapes.

Once the car was assembled, when it was time to paint it, they realized that it was too late and that they had to present it on the track the next day.

In the words of Carlos Pairetti : "It was 2 in the morning and at that time no paint shop was open. That's how they decided to look for some paint in the workshop, and they found three paint colors of one liter each: Red, Yellow and White. The result of the mixture of these colors was a bright Orange, very pretty and very striking, which, however, could not be repeated. Later, General Motors made its contribution, by releasing a series of vehicles with a stock orange, which was used to restore the colors of the car."

"The Orange Thunder came from the name that José Tomás Onetto called it, a sports journalist who covered the races for the Clarín newspaper. It was then that the name of the car came from that nickname."

=== The development of the car ===
After Ford withdrew support from Horacio Steven, Carlos Pairetti went to his workshop where the prototypes were kept. After a long talk, Pairetti managed to convince Steven to prepare the cars with Chevrolet 250-cubic-inch engines.

Pairetti's decision to race with this car was due to the fact that the prototypes he had been driving (Barracuda, Liebre I) were no longer up to the standard of Oreste Berta's powerful Liebres MkII. In addition, the choice of the "250" engine for the "230" that he had been using, was due to the fact that it was not only more powerful, but also reached its maximum power faster and had more output. So much so that with a multiplication of 3.08 to 1, the "250" needed 1,500 meters to make 6,000 rpm, while the "230" needed 3,000 meters to reach the same number of revolutions.

=== The debut of the official team and the arrival of the Golden Thunder ===
The "Auto Competición SCA" team, owned by Horacio Steven, was in charge of putting Trueno Naranja on track. In addition to its director, the team was made up of Pedro Campo, who designed the chassis, suspensions, and bodywork of the Trueno; Rodolfo Fraga, from the technical-practical department; Jorge Arcuri, sketcher, designer, and draughtsman; Alberto Maranga, designer; Jorge Rama, builder of the chassis and Carlos Morelos, mechanic. The motorization of the unit was in charge of the professional team of General Motors, under the command of Engineer Ricardo Félix Joseph, among whom were two mechanical technicians who would go down in the history of the TC in the future for their titles obtained as preparers: Jorge Pedersoli and Omar Wilke. two3 Upon completion, the car was christened the Fast-Chevrolet, alluding to the fastback-style design of the rear end of the car.

The debut took place on June 23, 1968, in the "250 miles of Buenos Aires ", with Pairetti being the fastest in the classification. During the development of the race, the Orange Thunder had been leading, until the rear differential broke.

In the words of Horacio Steven: "The car was equipped with new brakes and pads. There were doubts about the rear differential. In the end, it broke, and now we will get to work on redesigning it."

Meanwhile, for the following race, something new was coming: Orange Thunder was not going to be alone. Next to him, Horacio Steven had been preparing another prototype: The Golden Thunder. It came with all the technical characteristics of the Orange Thunder, with the difference that it was equipped from the start with the new rear differential design. The Golden Thunder was delivered on track to Oscar Fangio, nephew of multiple Formula 1 world champion Juan Manuel Fangio.

=== The victories and the 1968 Championship ===
After this abandonment, the squad was reorganized and presented the car in the Alta Gracia race, the following month. The result was favorable, Pairetti defeating Carlos Marincovich with his Martos-Chevrolet prototype (Prototype also known as Chevytres, manufactured by Francisco "Paco" Martos and serviced on the track by José Froilán González). With this result, Carlos Alberto Pairetti was 1.5 points behind the leader Héctor Gradassi. A month later, on August 18, 1968, Pairetti once again established himself in Alta Gracia and went on to lead the Championship with 2.5 points ahead of Gradassi. That day the Pairetti-Trueno duo won everything: Classification, series, and Final Race, bagging a sum of $755,000 in prizes.

After these victories, the dropouts returned. "Nene" Néstor García Veiga was given the responsibility of crewing the Orange Thunder because Pairetti traveled to Europe to arrange his incorporation into European Formula 2. On September 11, 1968, he ran the Buenos Aires race, where he had to drop out. After this trip, Pairetti got back on the Orange Thunder to compete on the Allen road circuit, where he also had to leave, on September 22.

But after these abandonments, the Trueno returned to the victorious path on September 29, this time in the Buenos Aires circuit. However, the following race he deserted again due to a problem with the radiator. It was on October 6 at the "El Zonda" racetrack. The winner of that competition was Eduardo Copello, but Pairetti held a 6-point lead over Héctor Gradassi.

After the following race, the ACA decided to replace the Coronation Grand Prix, with a Triangular Tournament that began on November 3, at the Rafaela Autodrome. That competition was a Chevrolet concert, as its winner was Carlos Marincovich aboard the Chevytres, Carlos Pairetti finished second in the Fast-Chevrolet, and Oscar Fangio finished third in the second Fast, all three prototypes powered by Chevrolet engines. That day marked the debut of the car nicknamed the Golden Thunder, accompanying the Orange Thunder in its battle with the MkII Hares. With this result, Pairetti stretched the lead over Gradassi to 8 points.

The second race of this triangle took place on November 17, at the Alta Gracia racetrack, where Eduardo Copello asserted his team's locality by winning the race. Carlos Pairetti finished second and maintained his 8-point advantage at the head of the tournament, only now his chaser was Copello.

Finally, everything was defined on November 24, 1968, when again at the Buenos Aires Autodromo, Pairetti, Copello, and Gradassi faced each other again. The competition would take place in two series, in which Pairetti won the first, Copello coming second and still with chances to win the title. However, the definition came before giving the green for the second series, because on the starting grid Eduardo Copello surprisingly got off his Hare, approached Carlos Pairetti 's Thunder, and shook his hand saying:

"Carlos, run calmly because you're the champion. My engine is blown, and I'm not going to get there."

At the start of the race, Pairetti allowed himself to be overtaken by Copello until, on the fourth lap, Copello's engine said enough and blew up. The race ended up being won by Pairetti being escorted by "Cacho" Fangio with the Golden Thunder. This result was more than enough for Pairetti, who won the title with a 17-point advantage over Copello.

=== The sunset in 1969 ===
In 1969, Carlos Pairetti tried to defend his title aboard the Trueno Naranja, however, the IKA hosts responded with a new lethal weapon: La Liebre MkIII Torino. This model was presented that year by the pilot Gastón Perkins, who would end up becoming champion that year. Realizing that nothing could cope with the power of this new machine, Pairetti decided to attack with the same weapons, changing the Orange Thunder for a MkIII Hare, which he motorized with a Chevrolet impeller. It was thus that in this way he would create the Nova Naranja, a model whose name arose from the original name with which Heriberto Pronello baptized this prototype, maintaining its characteristic orange color. Meanwhile, the Trueno began to be driven by Néstor García Veiga, who was unable to repeat Pairetti's success at the wheel of this unit. With 4 victories and a championship won, the history of the Orange Thunder closed, leaving an indelible mark in the history of National Motor Racing and Highway Tourism.

== Actuality ==
After having finished the 1969 championship, the Fast-Chevrolet was acquired in 1971 by the former driver and race car preparer Eduardo Bouvier, a resident of the town of Luján, Province of Buenos Aires. This rider had acquired the unit with which Pairetti had been proclaimed champion of Turismo Carretera in 1968 and had used it to compete in the new Argentine Sports Prototype category. Once the car was in his possession, Bouvier carried out different reforms in order to improve its performance, even cutting the roof. However, after two competitions where he did not achieve the expected results, he decided to withdraw the car from the competitions and keep it in his private workshop in the town of Luján.

The withdrawal of this car from competitions, added to Bouvier's reservation to show it in public, allowed different suspicions to begin to arise in the environment regarding the final destination of the car, which was always answered by the preparer with the exhibition of the documents that accredited it as its owner. However, after the announcement of the creation of a replica of this car by a group of students from the National Technological University of the city of Balcarce, 4 Bouvier finally agreed to show the car in public, at the same time starting the restoration of the same, with a view to the festivities that the Road Tourism Corridors Association had programmed in the year 2011, in order to commemorate the 75 years of its foundation. This work was facilitated by Bouvier himself, who kept the original parts of the car in his workshop, which in turn served as decorations on the walls of his workshop.

Once his work was completed, the relaunch of the Orange Thunder finally took place in the 75th Anniversary Caravan organized by the ACTC, in which the drivers and owners of the cars that participated throughout the history of Road Tourism were summoned.

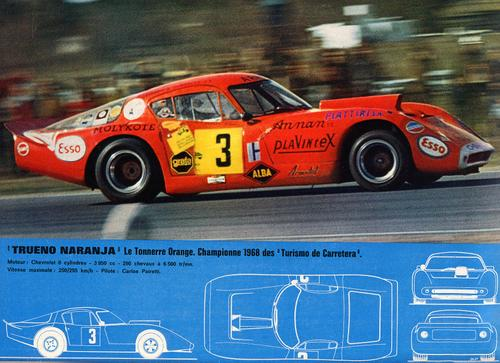

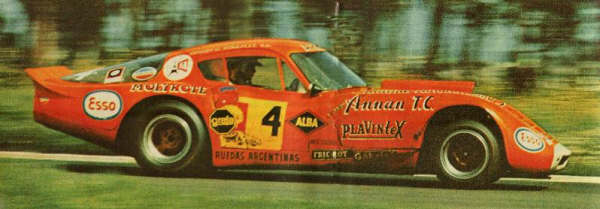

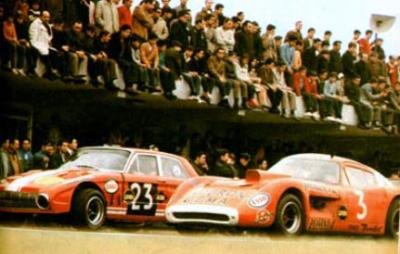
