= Silvio Oltra =

Argentine racing driver

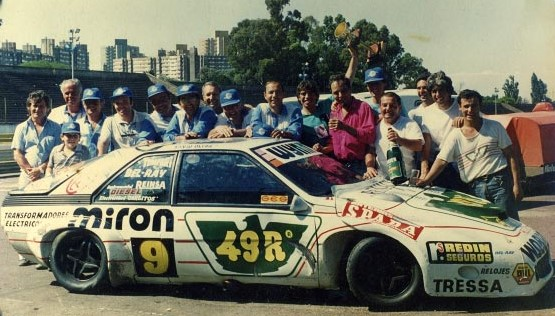
Silvio Oltra 1987

Silvio Hector Oltra (born 26 February 1958 – 15 March 1995) was an Argentine racing driver. He won the TC2000 championship in 1987.

Oltra was born in Buenos Aires, Argentina, on 26 February 1958. He died on March 15, 1995, while riding as a passenger in a Bell 206B-3 helicopter piloted by Carlos Menem, Jr., also a racing driver and son of President of Argentina Carlos Menem. The helicopter reportedly struck overhead power lines while taking off at San Nicolas, Argentina, and crashed, killing both men.

Sporting positions
Preceded by Juan María Traverso	TC2000 champion 1985	Succeeded by Juan María Traverso
