= Chevrolet Coupé SS =

Argentinian race car

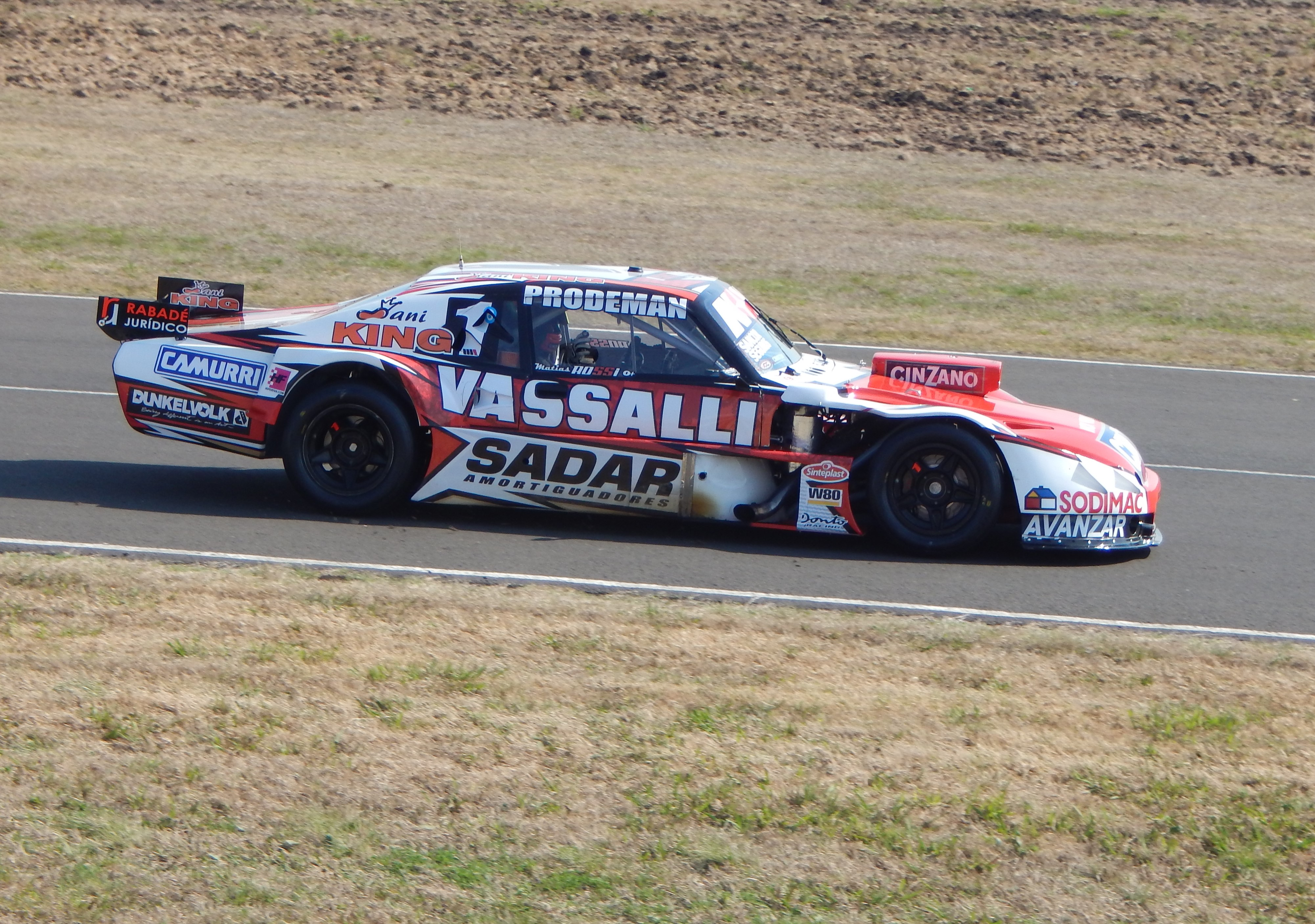
- Chevrolet Coupé of Matías Rossi in 2015
- Category: ACTC stock car
- Constructor: Chevrolet

Technical specifications
- Suspension (front): Double wishbones, pushrod actuated coil springs over shock absorbers, anti-roll bar (Deformable parallelogram)
- Suspension (rear): Double wishbones, pushrod actuated coil springs love shock absorbers, anti-roll bar (formerly rigid axle)
- Axle track: 1,498–1,628 mm (59.0–64.1 in) (front); 2,010 mm (79.1 in) (rear)
- Wheelbase: 2,789–2,849 mm (109.8–112.2 in)
- Engine: Chevrolet 192–194 cu in (3.1–3.2 L) OHV I6 naturally-aspirated FR
- Transmission: 5-speed manual
- Power: 340–500 hp (254–373 kW)
- Weight: 1,330 kg (2,932 lb)

Competition history

The Chevrolet Coupé SS is a stock car version of the Chevrolet Nova, designed to race in the Turismo Carretera series, and developed and built since 1968.

== Gallery ==
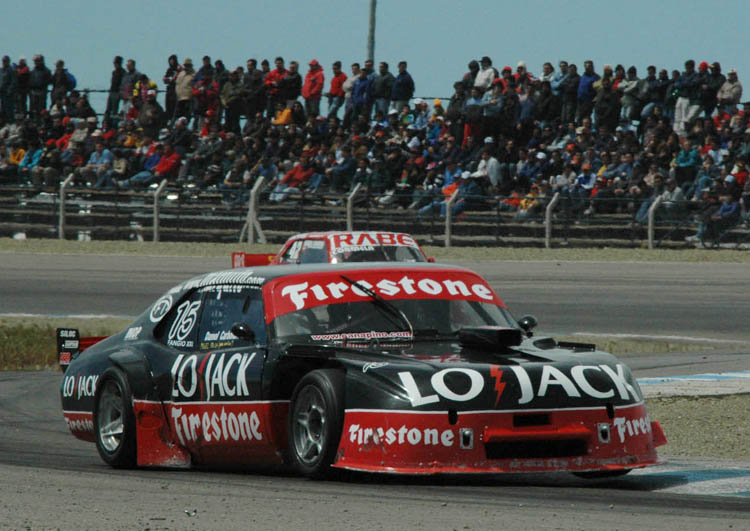
Chevrolet Coupé of Marcos di Palma in 2008
