= Francisco Espinosa (racing driver) =

Argentine racing driver

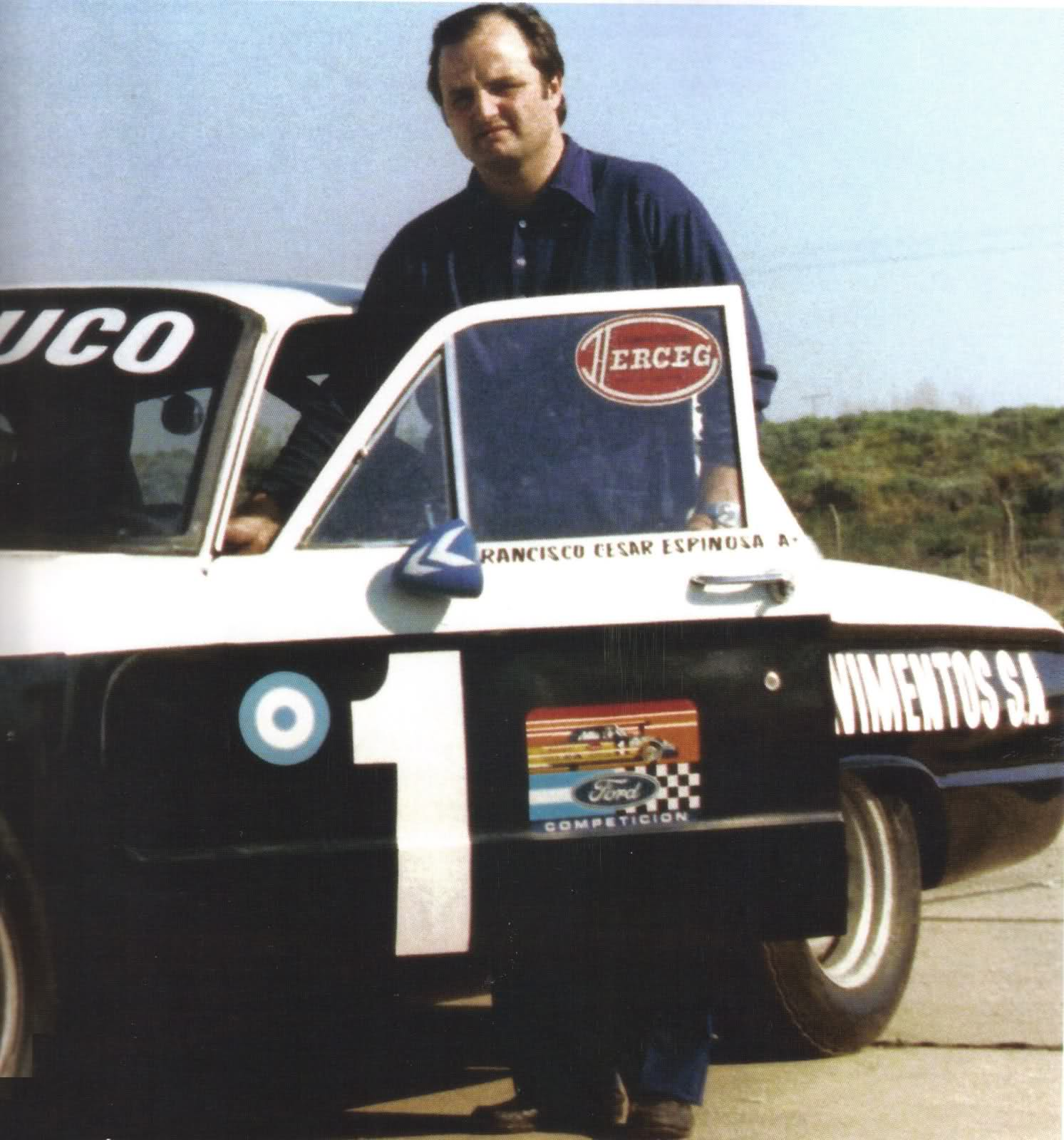
- Francisco Espinosa with his 1980/1981 Ford Falcon.
- Born: 25 November 1947 Chacabuco, Buenos Aires, Argentina
- Died: 18 February 2001 (aged 53) Chacabuco, Buenos Aires, Argentina

Championship titles
- 1979-1980: Turismo Carretera

Francisco César Espinosa (25 November 1947 – 18 February 2001) was an Argentine racing driver. He competed in Turismo Carretera intermittently between 1971 and 1990, winning the championship in the 1979/80 season. Likewise, he became the first TC champion driving a Chevrolet Chevy and the first to do so under the self-regency imposed by the Asociación Corredores de Turismo Carretera, in response to the conflict between the Argentine Automobile Club and the Argentine Confederation of Sports Motoring. During his foray into the TC, he used the IKA Torino, Chevrolet Chevy and Ford Falcon, a car model that he would use due to disagreements with the team with which he obtained his championship. He retired from the TC on 16 December 1990 in Tandil.

Espinosa died on 18 February 2001 in his hometown, Chacabuco. During his career in the TC, he started in 119 races, winning two of them, both in the 1979-80 season.
