= Rubén Daray =

Argentine racing driver (born 1950)

Rubén Cesar Daray (born March 2, 1950, in Buenos Aires Province), is an Argentine retired racing driver. He won the TC2000 Championship in 1985.

Sporting positions
| Preceded by Mario Gayraud | TC2000 champion 1985 | Succeeded by Juan María Traverso |
