= Juan Manuel Bordeu =

Argentine racing driver (1934–1990)

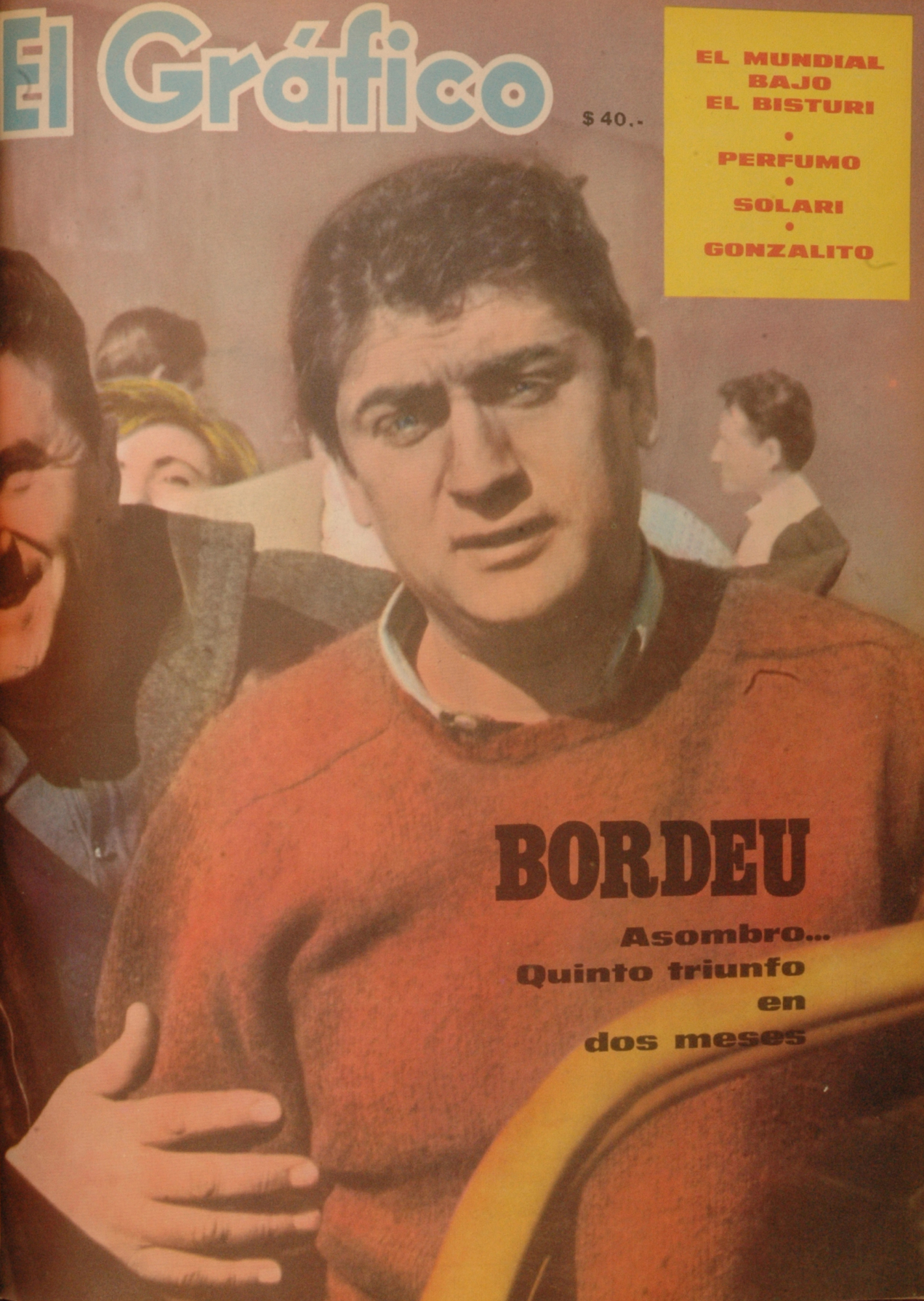
- Born: 28 January 1934; Balcarce, Buenos Aires, Argentina
- Died: 24 November 1990 (aged 56); Buenos Aires, Argentina

Formula One World Championship career
- Nationality: (Argentina) Argentine
- Active years: 1961
- Team: UDT Laystall
- Entries: 1 (0 starts)
- Championships: 0
- Wins: 0
- Podiums: 0
- Career points: 0
- Pole positions: 0
- Fastest laps: 0
- First entry: 1961 French Grand Prix

Juan Manuel Bordeu (28 January 1934 – 24 November 1990) was a racing driver from Balcarce, Argentina. A protégé of Juan Manuel Fangio, Bordeu had a successful early career but a bad testing accident wrecked his chances in Formula One. His only World Championship Formula One entry was at the 1961 French Grand Prix in a Lotus run by the UDT Laystall team, but the car was eventually driven by Lucien Bianchi.

Bordeu raced on until his retirement in 1973, after which he represented his country as a delegate of FISA.

== Complete Formula One results ==
(key)

Yr	Entrant	Chassis	Engine	1	2	3	4	5	6	7	8	WDC	Points
1961	UDT Laystall Racing Team	Lotus 18/21	Climax Straight-4	MON	NED	BEL	FRA; DNS	GBR	GER	ITA	USA	NC	0

Sporting positions
Preceded by Dante Emiliozzi	Turismo Carretera; Champion; 1966	Succeeded by Eduardo Copello
