= Aimogasta =

Coordinates: 28°33′S 66°49′W

- Municipality and village
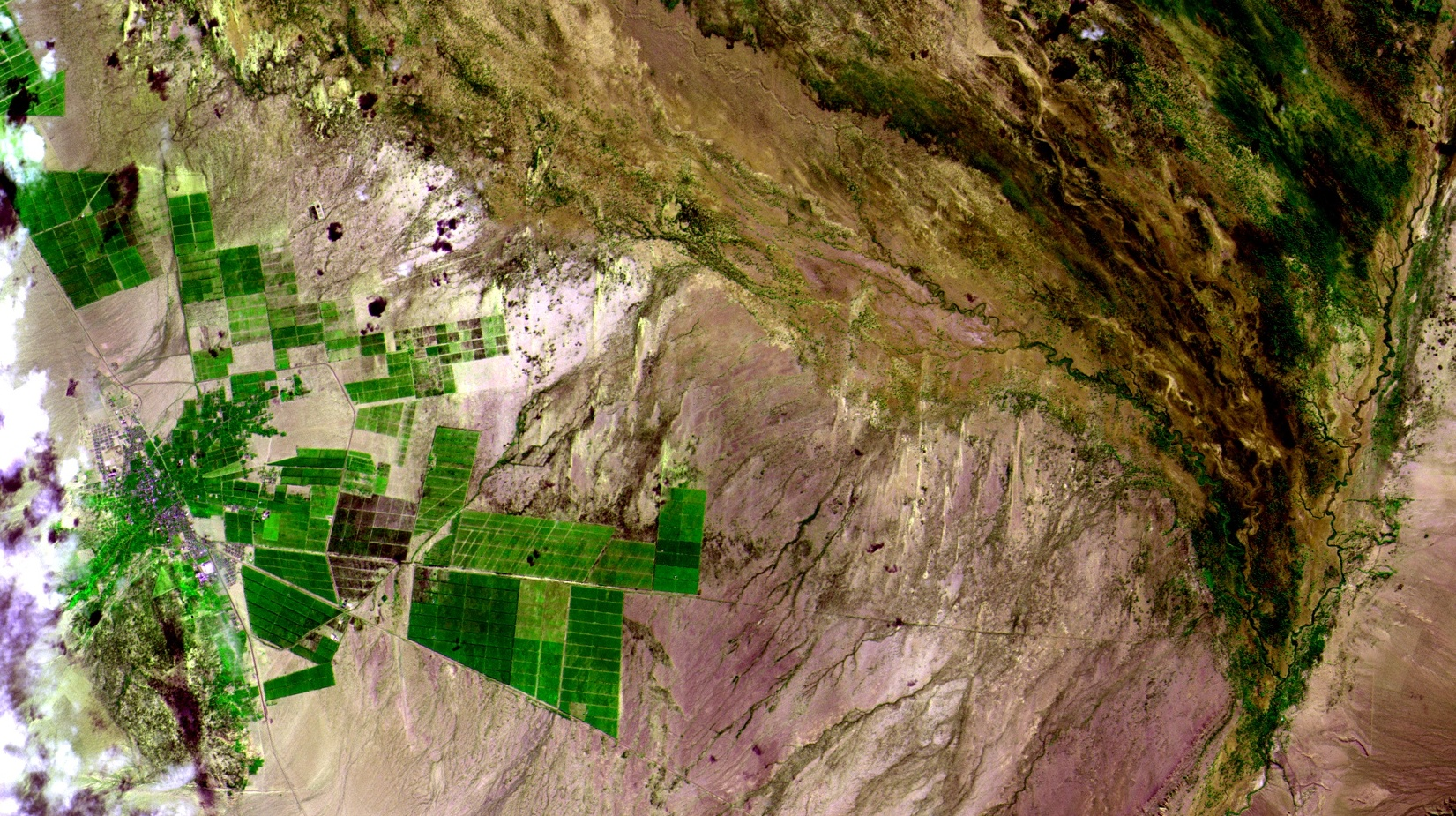
- Villa de Concepción de Aimogasta, north of Providencia de La Rioja, Argentina, on the left. in the false-color image from the CBERS4 satellite, surrounded by irrigated olive and jojoba plantations, in green tones
- Interactive map of Aimogasta
- Country: Argentina
- Province: La Rioja Province
- Time zone: UTC−3 (ART)
- Climate: BWh

Aimogasta is a municipality and village in La Rioja Province in northwestern Argentina.
