= Héctor Gradassi =

Argentine racing driver

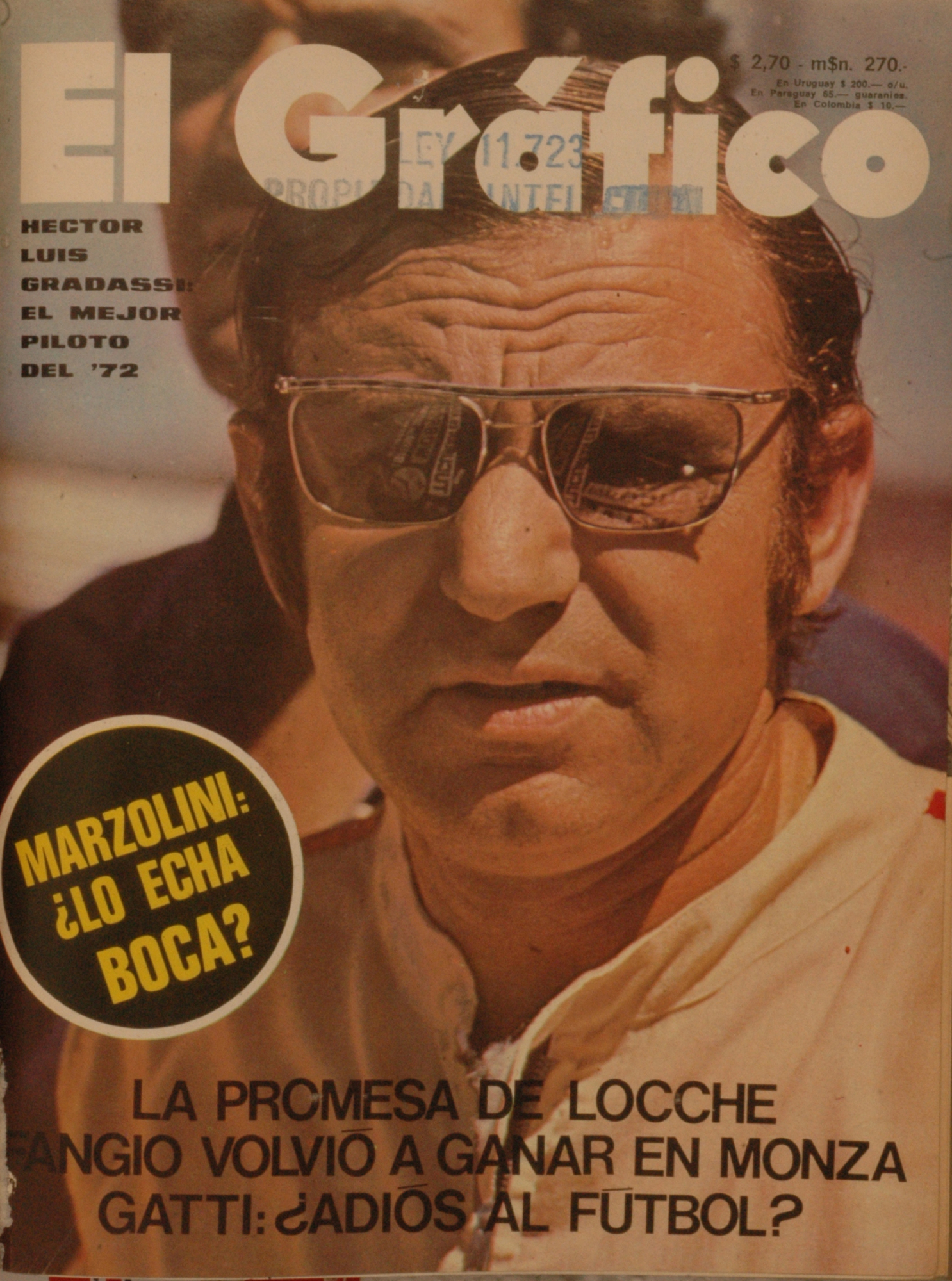
- Gradassi on the cover of Argentinian sports magazine El Gráfico.

Personal Information
- Born: March 6, 1933
- Died: February 4, 2003 (69 years old)
- Place of birth: Córdoba, Argentina

Career
- Debut: 1964
- Withdrawal: 1982
- Races participated in: 244
- Races won: 49

Héctor Luis Gradassi (6 March 1933 - 4 February 2003) was an Argentine motorist. Most of his career was carried out in Turismo Carretera, where he was a champion for the Ford brand 4 times.

== Career ==
Before racing cars, Gradassi competed in motorcycle races in 100cc and 125cc classes. He won the National title in 1960, 1961 and 1962 before switching to cars in 1964.

Gradassi began his car racing career in 1964 through Improved Touring. He first entered Turismo Carretera in 1967 after being signed by the official Industrias Kaiser Argentina team, where he won his debut race. He won the Turismo Carretera Championship in 1972, 1974, 1975 and 1976.

After leaving the IKA team in 1970, Gradassi signed for the official team of the Ford subsidiary, driving a Ford Falcon. In the highest category of Argentine motorsports, Gradassi was able to become champion four times, always driving a Ford Falcon. During his time at Ford, he got to know other well-known TC competitors such as Nasif Estéfano, Esteban Fernandino and Juan María Traverso.

Throughout his career, Gradassi participated in 244 races, winning 49 of them.

== Social Life ==
"Pirín", as Gradassi was nicknamed, was part of the Córdoba Automobile Club where he was a member of the board of directors for many years. He was also part of a local Antique Car Club, with which he participated in many regular competitions even after retirement.

Sporting positions
Preceded by Rubén Luis di Palma	Turismo Carretera champion 1972	Succeeded by Nasif Estéfano
Preceded by Nasif Estéfano	Turismo Carretera champion 1974-1976	Succeeded by Juan María Traverso
