= Toyota Argentina =

Wholly owned subsidiary of Toyota

- Type: Subsidiary
- Industry: Automotive
- Founded: 1994; 32 years ago
- Founder: Toyota
- Headquarters: Zárate, Buenos Aires, Argentina
- Key people: Gustavo Salinas (president)
- Products: Automobiles, pickups
- Number of employees: 5,000 (2017)
- Parent: Toyota
- Website: toyota.com.ar

Toyota Argentina S.A. is the Argentine subsidiary of Japan-based conglomerate Toyota, being also the first Japanese automotive company to produce in Argentina. Established in 1994, the company has its manufacturing plant in Zárate, Buenos Aires, which opened in 1997.

Since its establishment, Toyota Argentina has produced more than 1,500,000 vehicles not only for the local market but for Latin American and Caribbean regions. Furthermore, the company achieved sales leadership in the Argentine market in 2021, exporting more than 80% of its production.

== History ==
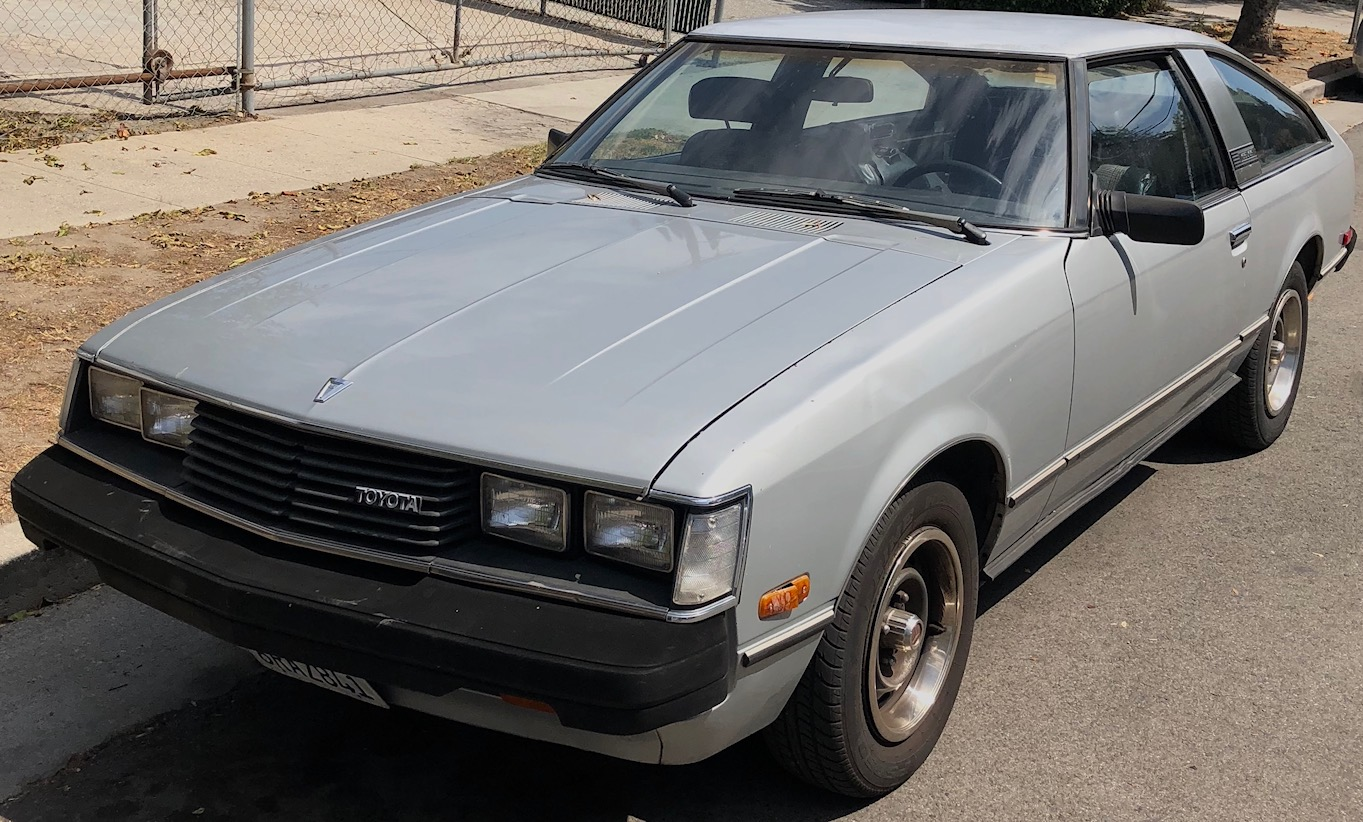
The Celica was one of the earliest Toyota models in Argentina, imported in late 1970s

The first Toyota vehicles were imported to Argentina in the 1950s because of a law that allowed the import of duty free vehicles in Patagonia. Nevertheless, Toyota cars did not experience a real success until the late 1970s to mid-1980s with the imported models like the Celica coupe and Hilux pickup.

In 1993, Toyota decided to establish itself in Argentina as part of a global strategy within Mercosur. Since the end of the 1950s, Toyota already had an assembly plant in Brazil where it produced the Bandeirante utility vehicle, and the regime in force in the region allowed a complementation between both factories.

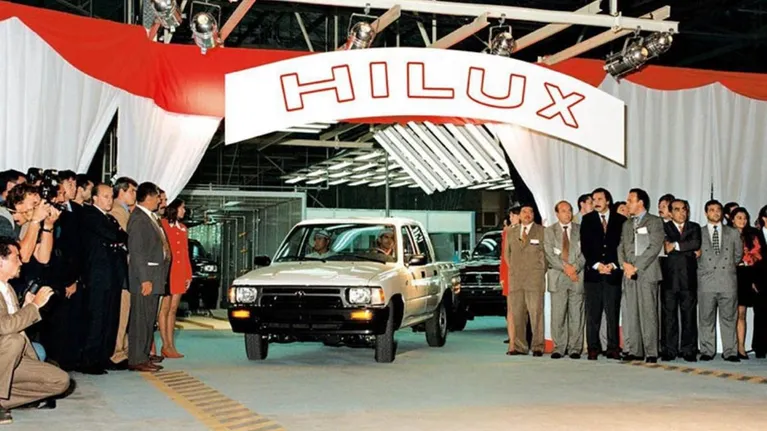
The first Toyota Hilux begins to be manufactured in Argentina in Zarate Buenos Aires 1997

Toyota Argentina was founded in 1994 during the Carlos Menem's presidency. At first, the company imported vehicles prior to taking over manufacturing process in 1997, with the Hilux pickup being the first model produced by the firm in Argentina. During the first year of production, 10,000 unit were assembled.

The company inaugurated its plant in Zárate, Buenos Aires, on 21 March 1997, which became not only its 29th production plant in the world but the first Japanese investment in the Argentine automotive industry. In the next 20 years, more than US$2 billion were invested in the 1,320,000 m^{2} (14,200,000 sq ft) Zárate plant. As of 2017, the facilities had a production capacity of 140,000 units -of which 70% are destined for export markets- and a workforce of 5,000 employees.

In 2000, 50,000 units were produced. The following year, Toyota Argentina had a 30.9% share of the pick-up market with more than 66,000 units produced. That year the company a new version which required an investment of US$30 million. Plus, 150 new jobs were added. During 2002, Toyota announced an investment of US$200 million, converting the Zárate plant into a platform for the production and export of multipurpose vehicles for Latin America. Toyota Argentina reached 100,000 units produced in 2003.

Toyota launched its second model produced in Argentina, the Fortuner (named "SW4" locally) SUV in 2004. Two years later, the company increased its production to 60,000 units, with 75% being exported to more than 20 countries in Latin American and the Caribbean. The workforce, initially consisting of 400 (or 750) employees, grew to 2,700 by 2007 and was more than 4,000 in 2011 and 5,000 in 2015.

By 2016, Hilux and SW4 models were exported to most countries in South America including Chile, Ecuador, Peru, Bolivia, Brazil, Colombia, Paraguay, and Uruguay. That same year, countries of Central America and the Caribbean were added to the list of export markets. That same year, Toyota Argentina reached 1,000,000 units produced, composed of 860,000 Hilux and 140,000 SW4 models. The Hilux pickup was the most selling vehicle in Argentina.

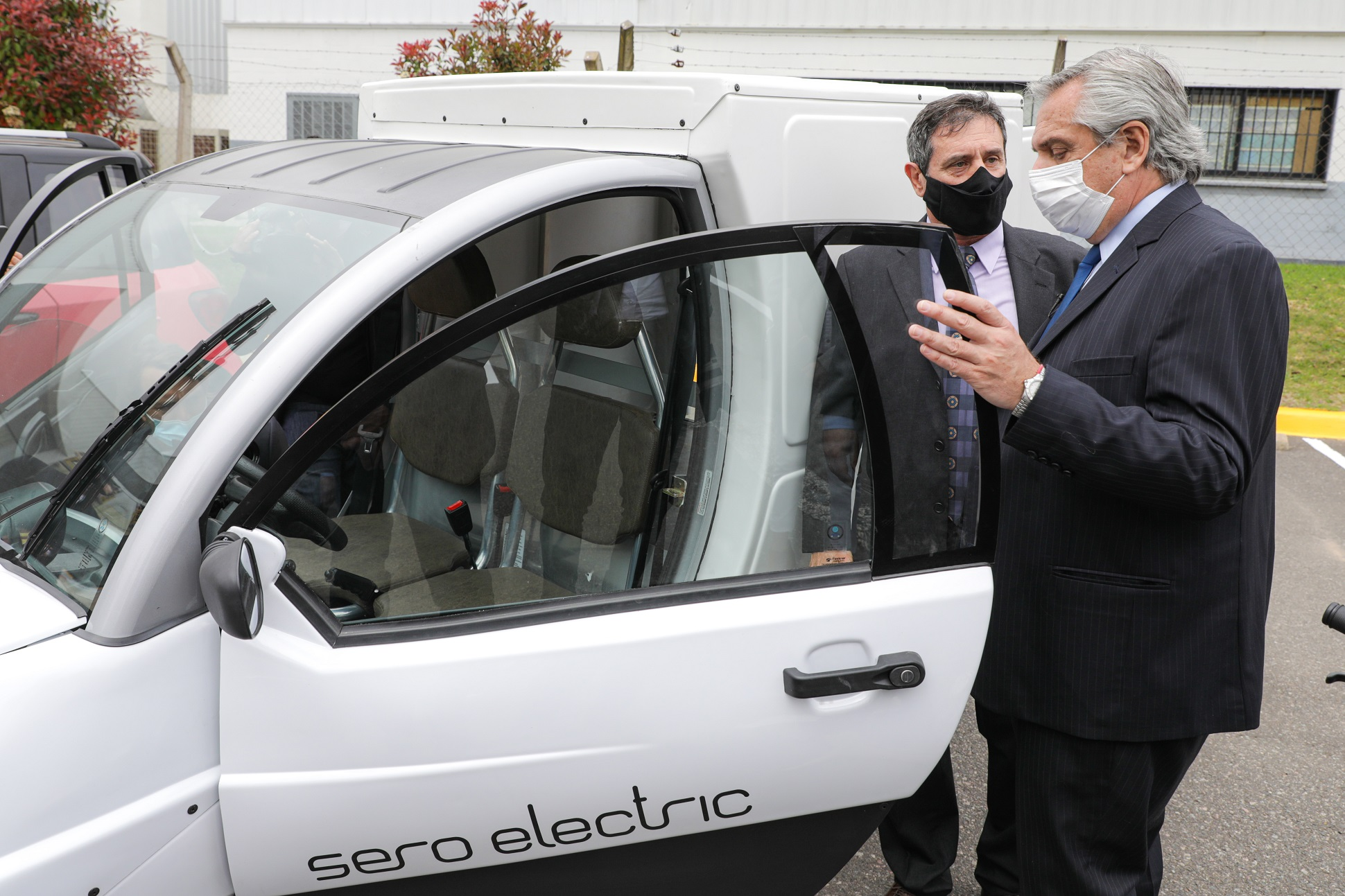
President of Argentina Alberto Fernández visiting the plant in October 2021

By 2019 Toyota had produced more than 1,400,000 units in Argentina in 22 uninterrupted years of activity and with an accumulated investment of more than 2,000 million dollars. With two models in production, Hilux and SW4, the Japanese automaker added a workforce of 6,200 employees. In August 2020, Toyota Argentina set a new record by exporting its 1,000,000th. unit. The vehicle, a Hilux pick up, was sent to El Salvador. A few months later, on 30 November 2020, the factory reached the milestone of 1,500,000 units produced since 1997.

During 2021, the brand achieved sales leadership in the Argentine market for the first time in its 25 years of activity, surpassing Volkswagen Argentina which had led the market for 17 years. Furthermore, the Hilux model consolidated as the most selling pickup in Argentina. That year, in addition, Toyota Argentina achieved a new production record with 142,525 units of the Hilux and SW4 models, of which 80% was destined for export.

In June 2023, Toyota announced that the plant would produce its light commercial vehicle model HiAce, the first model produced in Argentina after 23 years, with an estimated investment of US$50 million. The HiAce will be also the first van assembled by the Japanese manufacturer in the country. At a first stage, 4,000 units will be produced to be commercialised in Argentina and Brazil.

== Vehicles ==
=== Produced ===
Name	Type	Release	Image
Hilux	Pickup	1997	
Fortuner (Note: Named "SW4" in Argentina.)	SUV	2005	
Hiace	Van	2024	

=== Imported ===
Countries of origin are indicated in brackets:

- bZ4X (Japan, 2026–present)
- Corolla (Brazil, 1981–present)
- Corolla Cross (Brazil, 2021–present)
- Etios (Brazil, 2013–2023)
- GR 86 (Japan, 2022–present)
- GR Yaris (Japan, 2021–present)
- Yaris (Thailand, 2016-2018, Brazil, 2018–present)
- Yaris Cross (Brazil, 2026–present)
- Prius (2009–2022)
- 86 (2012-2019)
- Avensis (2007-2009)
- Hilux (1979–1997–present)
- Innova (2018–2021)
- C-HR (2019–2023)
- Stout (1960s–1981)
- Dyna (1980-1995)
- Coaster (1980-1995)
- Tercel (1981–1999)
- Tacoma (1990s)
- MR2 (1990s)
- Celica (1979–2002)
- Carina (1981–1989)
- Corona (1980–2003)
- Camry (1985–2022)
- Cressida (1979–1990)
- Hiace (1980–Present)
- LiteAce (1981-1991)
- Crown (1973–Present)
- Starlet (1981–1982)
- Toyota Land Cruiser (J40) (1960s–1982)
- Land Cruiser (1986–present)
- Previa (1992-1997)
- Supra (1981–1992?)
- RAV4 (1994–present)
- 4Runner (1987–2000)

== Motorsport ==
In 2000 Toyota Team Argentina was founded, which today is called Toyota Gazoo Racing Argentina. They participate in various national championships.
