= Walter Hernández (racing driver) =

Argentine former racing driver (born 1965)

Walter Antonio Hernández (born 20 July 1965 in Comandante Nicanor Otamendi, Buenos Aires) is an Argentine former racing driver. He won the Turismo Carretera championship in 1993.

Sporting positions
Preceded by Oscar Aventin	Turismo Carretera champion 1993	Succeeded by Eduardo Ramos
