= Jorge Martínez Boero =

Argentine racing driver

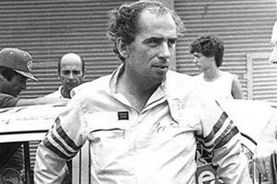
- Martínez Boero in 1982.
- Born: 23 May 1937 La Plata, Buenos Aires, Argentina
- Died: 11 June 2004 (aged 67) San Carlos de Bolívar, Buenos Aires, Argentina

Championship titles
- 1982: Turismo Carretera

Jorge Martínez Boero (23 May 1937 – 11 June 2004) was an Argentine racing driver. He competed in Turismo Carretera, winning the championship in the 1982 season.

Martínez Boero was the father of Jorge Andrés Boero, who was killed during the first stage of the 2012 Dakar Rally. Likewise, Rómulo Martínez Boero, Jorge's nephew, competed at the national level in motorsports, racing in the Copa Fiesta and Top Race Junior categories. In the first, he managed to become champion of the Apertura Tournament of 2007, after playing six dates and beating Carlos Ortíz by two points.
