= Juan Gálvez (racing driver) =

Argentine racing driver (1916–1963)

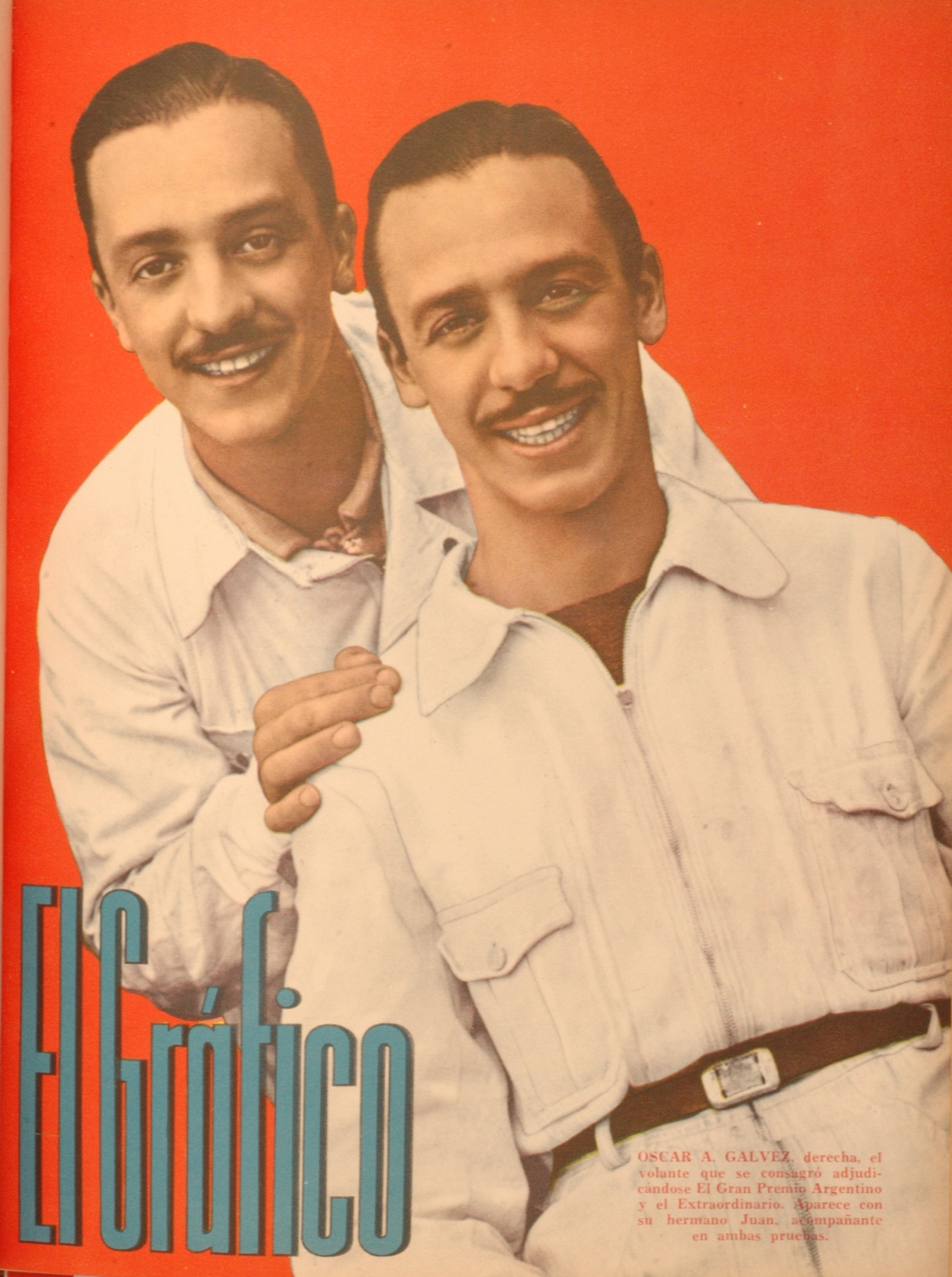
- Juan (left) and brother Oscar, 1947
- Nationality: Argentine
- Born: 14 February 1916 Buenos Aires, Argentina
- Died: 3 March 1963 (aged 47) Olavarría, Buenos Aires Province

Championship titles
- 1949, 1950, 1951, 1952, 1955, 1956, 1957, 1958, 1961: Turismo Carretera

Juan Gálvez (Buenos Aires, 14 February 1916 – 3 March 1963 in Olavarría) was an Argentine racing driver, and the brother of driver Oscar Alfredo Gálvez.

== Life and career ==
Juan and his brother started racing together in Turismo Carretera but then took separate ways and competed in different cars. He made his debut in the Avellaneda Automobile Club 1000-Mile race on 14 February 1941 and finished second to Juan Manuel Fangio. His first win came on 22 February 1949 at the I Vuelta de Santa Fe. He won the Turismo Carretera championship nine times, in 1949, 1950, 1951, 1952, 1955, 1956, 1957, 1958 and 1961. His last victory was at the IV Vuelta de Laboulaye (1962) behind the wheel of a Ford.

== Death ==
Gálvez was killed during an accident at Olavarría race in 1963. In 13 years of motorsport, he competed in 153 races, winning more than 50 times.

== See also ==
- Autódromo Juan y Oscar Gálvez
