= Jorge Andrés Martínez Boero =

Argentine motorcycle racer

- Nationality: (Argentina) Argentine
- Born: 3 July 1973 San Carlos de Bolívar, Buenos Aires
- Died: 1 January 2012 (aged 38) Mar del Plata, Buenos Aires

Jorge Andrés Martínez Boero (3 July 1973 – 1 January 2012) was an Argentine motorcycle racer who participated in the 2011 and 2012 Dakar Rally. He died in an accident during the first stage of the 2012 competition.
