= Asociación Corredores de Turismo Carretera =

Sports governing body in Argentina

- Sport: Auto racing
- Category: Stock car racing Touring car racing
- Abbreviation: ACTC
- Founded: 30 August 1960; 65 years ago
- Headquarters: Buenos Aires, Argentina
- President: Hugo Mazzacane

Official website
- www.actc.org.ar

Asociación Corredores de Turismo Carretera (ACTC) is a governing body based in Argentina that specializes in auto racing competitions. It was founded on 30 August 1960, initially as a representative body and defender of the rights of drivers who competed in the Turismo Carretera category (hence its name), and then transformed in the mid-1970s into a competition inspection body, independent of the highest automotive body in Argentina: The Argentine Automobile Club. Currently, the ACTC is chaired by the former Turismo Carretera driver Hugo Mazzacane, and is in charge of the supervision of all the divisions of the TC. In addition to this category, ACTC also supervised the competitions of the Top Race V6 category, which it created in 1997 and which it ceased to audit in 2011.
