= 2024 Turismo Carretera =

82nd season of Turismo Carretera

The 2024 Turismo Carretera is the 82nd season of Turismo Carretera, the premier stock car category of Argentina.

Julián Santero won the championship, his first in Turismo Carretera, after title rival Mariano Werner's engine was sabotaged by spectators in the final race of the season.

== Calendar ==
Round	Circuit (Event Name)	Date	Map
Etapa Regular (Regular season)			2024 Turismo Carretera is located in Argentina
1	(Santa Cruz Province, Argentina) Autódromo Enrique Freile; El Calafate, Santa Cruz	February 25	2024 Turismo Carretera is located in Argentina
2	(Río Negro Province) Autódromo Ciudad de Viedma; Viedma, Río Negro	March 17	2024 Turismo Carretera is located in Argentina
3	(Neuquén Province) Autódromo Parque Provincia del Neuquén; Centenario, Neuquén	April 7	2024 Turismo Carretera is located in Argentina
4	(La Pampa Province) Autódromo Provincia de La Pampa; Toay, La Pampa	April 28	2024 Turismo Carretera is located in Argentina
5	(Santiago del Estero Province) Autódromo Termas de Río Hondo; Termas de Río Hondo, Santiago del Estero	May 12	2024 Turismo Carretera is located in Argentina
6	(Entre Ríos Province) Autódromo de Concepción del Uruguay; Concepción del Uruguay, Entre Ríos	May 26	2024 Turismo Carretera is located in Argentina
7	(Santa Fe Province) Autódromo Ciudad de Rafaela; Rafaela, Santa Fe	June 16	2024 Turismo Carretera is located in Argentina
8	(Misiones Province) Autódromo Rosamonte; Posadas, Misiones	July 7	2024 Turismo Carretera is located in Argentina
9	(San Juan Province, Argentina) Circuito San Juan Villicum; Albardón, San Juan	July 28	2024 Turismo Carretera is located in Argentina
10	(Buenos Aires) Autódromo Oscar y Juan Gálvez; Buenos Aires	August 18	2024 Turismo Carretera is located in Argentina
Copa de Oro (playoffs)			2024 Turismo Carretera is located in Argentina
11	(San Luis Province) Autódromo Rosendo Hernández; San Luis, San Luis Province	September 15	2024 Turismo Carretera is located in Argentina
12	(Entre Ríos Province) Autódromo Ciudad de Paraná; Paraná, Entre Ríos Province	September 29	2024 Turismo Carretera is located in Argentina
13	(Buenos Aires Province) Autódromo San Nicolás; San Nicolás, Buenos Aires Province	October 20	2024 Turismo Carretera is located in Argentina
14	(La Pampa Province) Autódromo Provincia de La Pampa; Toay, La Pampa	November 10	2024 Turismo Carretera is located in Argentina
15	(Buenos Aires Province) Autódromo Roberto Mouras; La Plata, Buenos Aires Province	December 1	2024 Turismo Carretera is located in Argentina

== Teams and drivers ==
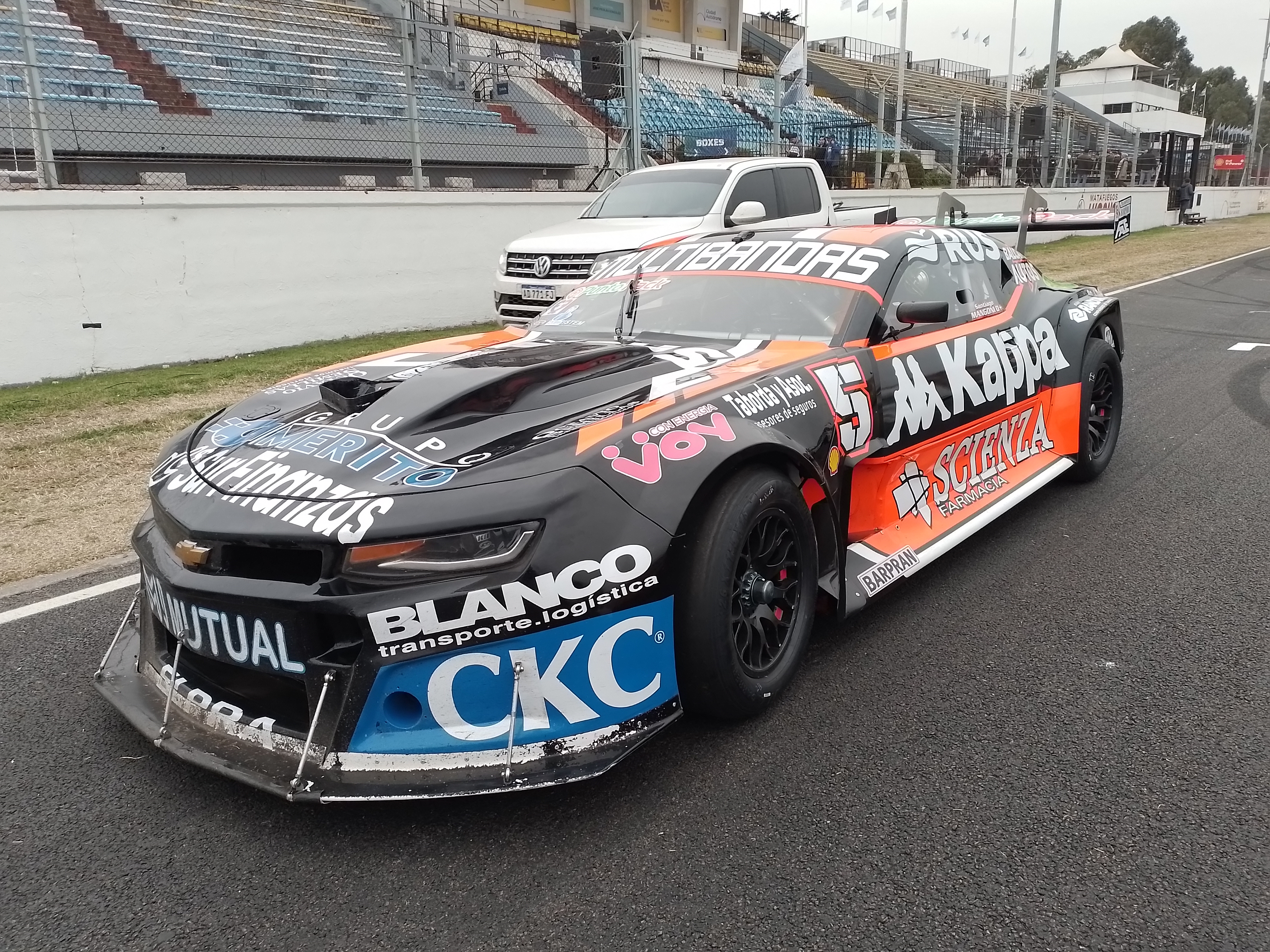
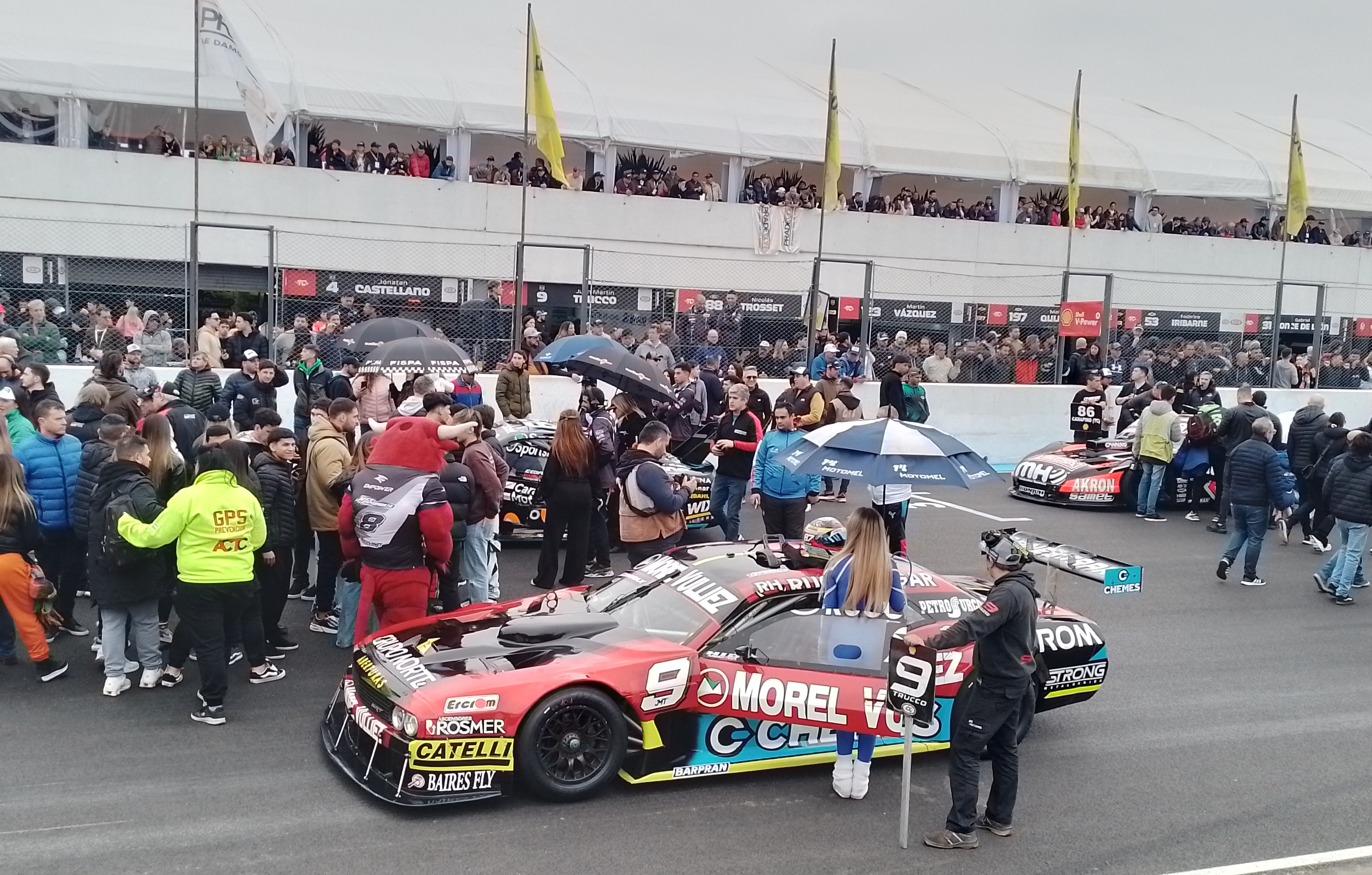
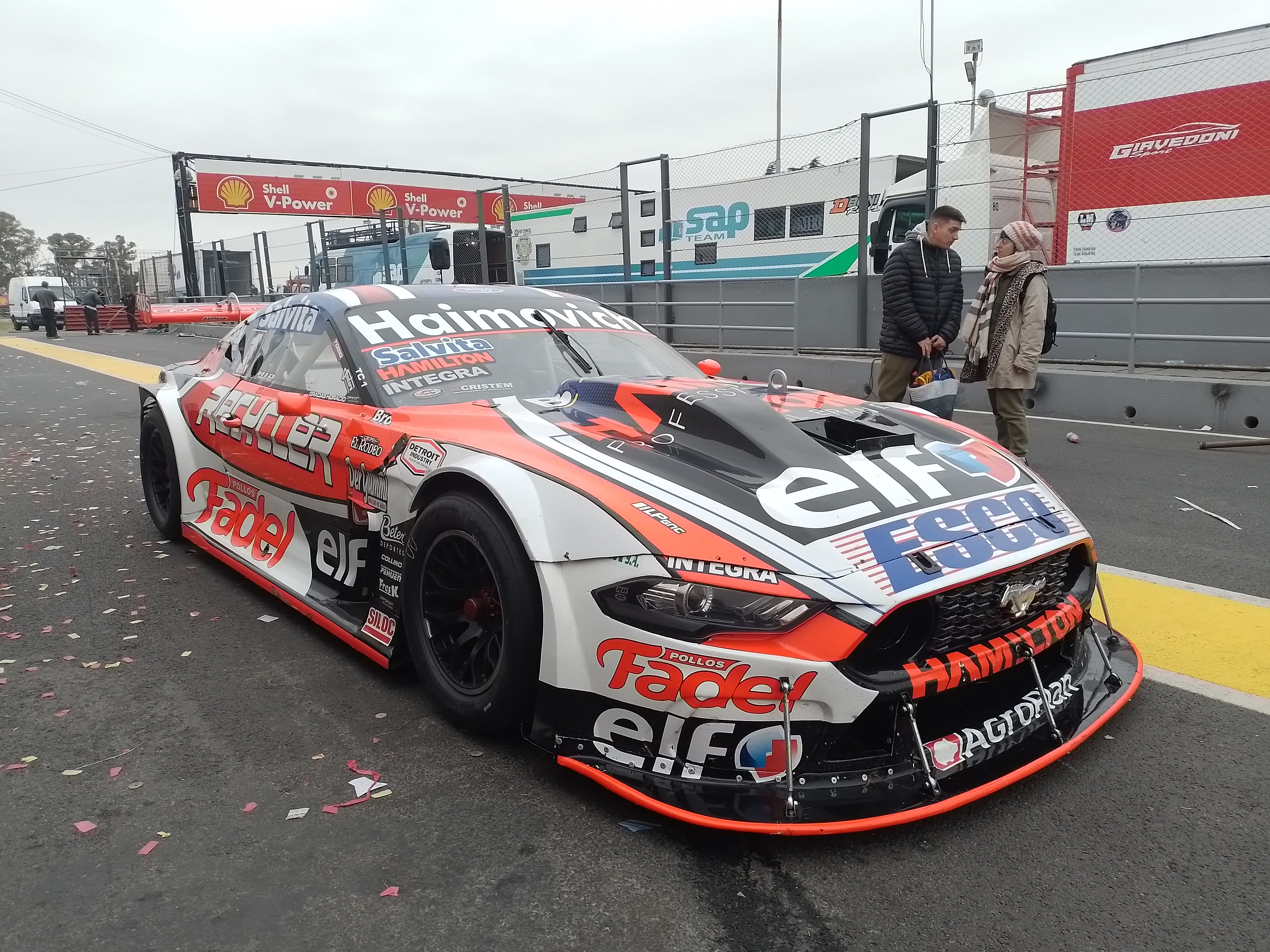
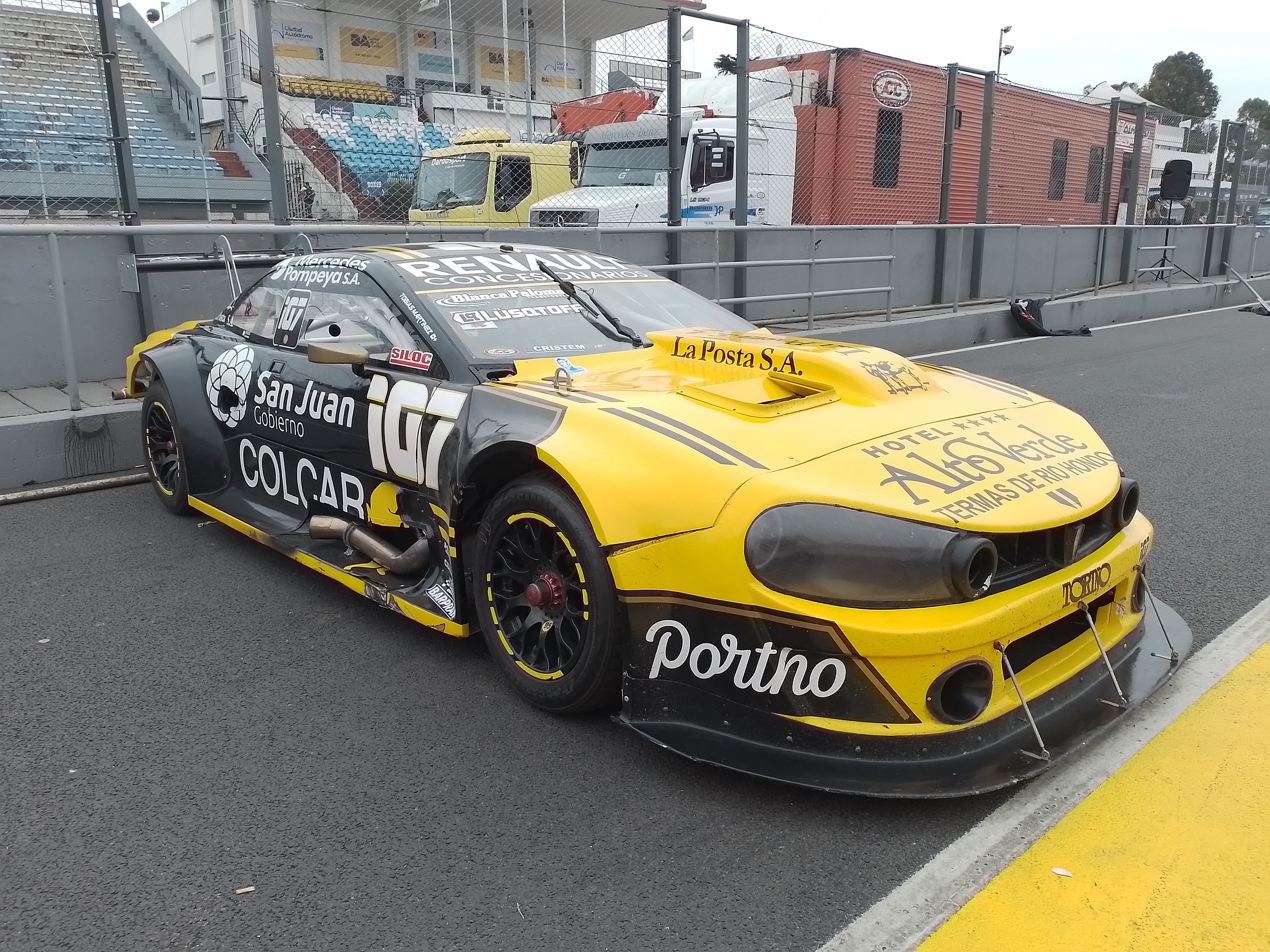

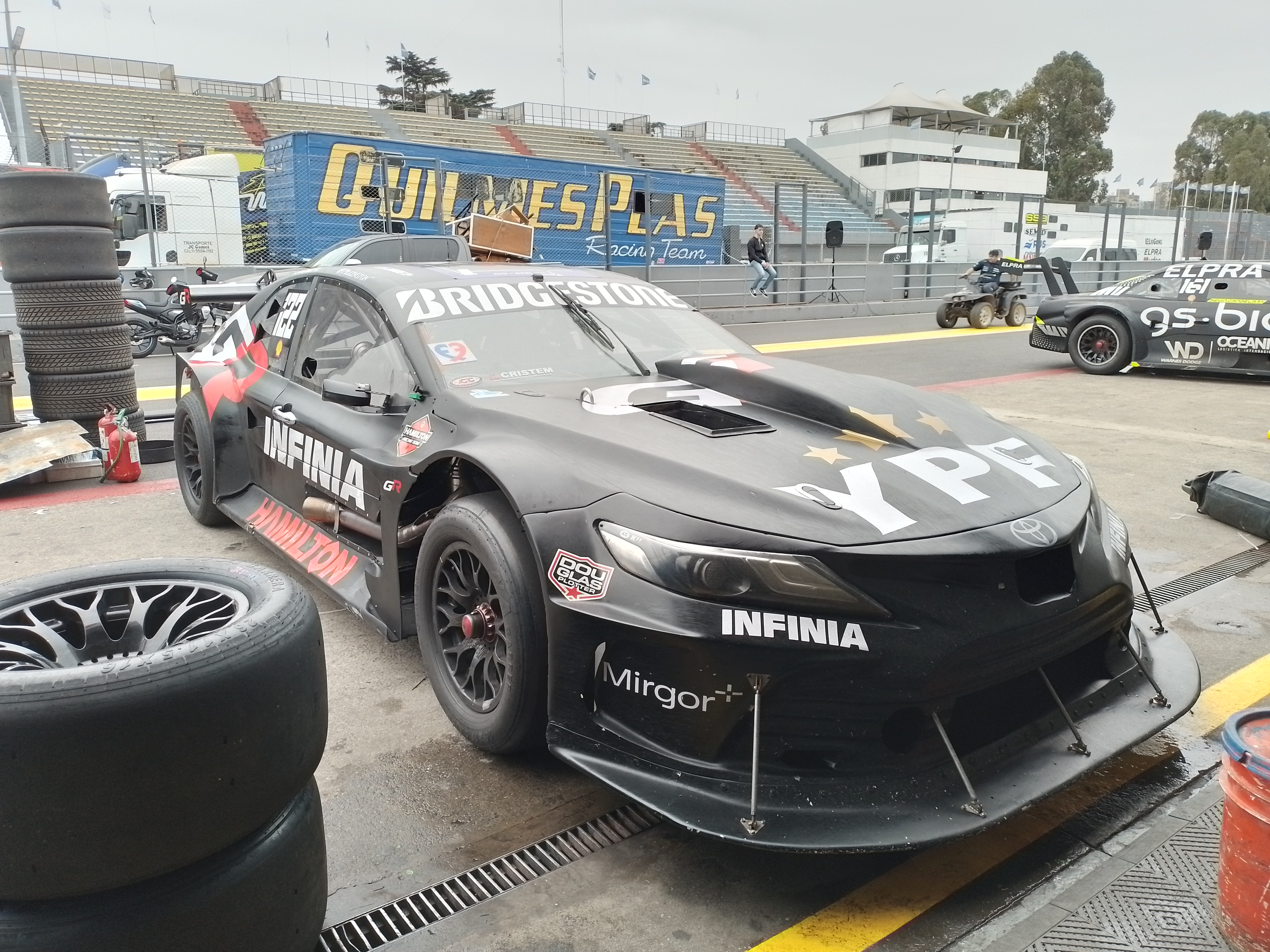
The new models from top to bottom: Chevrolet, Dodge, Ford, Torino, and Toyota.

Manufacturer	Car	Team	No.	Driver	Events
Chevrolet	Chevy	Las Toscas Racing	5	(Argentina) Santiago Mangoni	1-5
Chevrolet	Chevy	Canning Motorsports	5	(Argentina) Santiago Mangoni	6-9
Chevrolet	Chevy	Canning Motorsports	10	(Argentina) Valentín Aguirre	6-8
Chevrolet	Chevy	Canning Motorsports	19	(Argentina) Diego Ciantini	6-7
Chevrolet	Chevy	Canning Motorsports	86	(Argentina) Agustín Canapino	10
Chevrolet	Chevy	JP Carrera	10	(Argentina) Valentín Aguirre	1-5
Chevrolet	Chevy	JP Carrera	19	(Argentina) Diego Ciantini	1-5
Chevrolet	Chevy	Dole Racing	12	(Argentina) Gastón Mazzacane	1-8
Chevrolet	Chevy	LRD Performance	22	(Argentina) Juan José Ebarlín	1-7
Chevrolet	Chevy	LRD Performance	115	(Argentina) Diego de Carlo	2-8
Chevrolet	Chevy	Hermanos Álvarez Competición	47	(Argentina) Norberto Fontana	1-5, 7-12
Chevrolet	Chevy	Alifraco Sport	53	(Argentina) Federico Iribarne	1-3
Chevrolet	Chevy	Alifraco Sport	96	(Argentina) Juan Cruz Benvenuti	1-7
Chevrolet	Chevy	Dose Competición	60	(Argentina) Christian Dose	4, 10, 15
Chevrolet	Chevy	RUS Med Team	63	(Argentina) Nicolás Bonelli	6-12
Chevrolet	Chevy	RUS Med Team	83	(Argentina) Facundo Ardusso	1-5
Chevrolet	Chevy	LCA Racing	71	(Argentina) Sebastián Abella	1
Chevrolet	Chevy	Giavedoni Sport	75	(Argentina) Sergio Alaux	1-4, 7
Chevrolet	Chevy	Roberto Valle Racing Sport	83	(Argentina) Facundo Ardusso	6-9
Chevrolet	Camaro Mk.6	Canning Motorsports	5	(Argentina) Santiago Mangoni	10-15
Chevrolet	Camaro Mk.6	Canning Motorsports	10	(Argentina) Valentín Aguirre	9-15
Chevrolet	Camaro Mk.6	Canning Motorsports	19	(Argentina) Diego Ciantini	8-15
Chevrolet	Camaro Mk.6	Canning Motorsports	86	(Argentina) Agustín Canapino	11-15
Chevrolet	Camaro Mk.6	Canning Motorsports	117	(Argentina) Guillermo Ortelli	10
Chevrolet	Camaro Mk.6	Canning Motorsports	172	(Argentina) Santiago Álvarez	9-15
Chevrolet	Camaro Mk.6	Pradecon Racing	11	(Argentina) Christian Ledesma	All
Chevrolet	Camaro Mk.6	Dole Racing	12	(Argentina) Gastón Mazzacane	9-15
Chevrolet	Camaro Mk.6	LRD Performance	22	(Argentina) Juan José Ebarlín	8-15
Chevrolet	Camaro Mk.6	LRD Performance	85	(Argentina) Ricardo Risatti III	All
Chevrolet	Camaro Mk.6	LRD Performance	115	(Argentina) Diego de Carlo	10-12, 14-15
Chevrolet	Camaro Mk.6	Hermanos Álvarez Competición	47	(Argentina) Norberto Fontana	13-15
Chevrolet	Camaro Mk.6	Alifraco Sport	53	(Argentina) Federico Iribarne	4-8
Chevrolet	Camaro Mk.6	Alifraco Sport	96	(Argentina) Juan Cruz Benvenuti	8-15
Chevrolet	Camaro Mk.6	Uranga Racing	53	(Argentina) Federico Iribarne	10-13
Chevrolet	Camaro Mk.6	Uranga Racing	197	(Argentina) Marcos Quijada	All
Chevrolet	Camaro Mk.6	RUS Med Team	63	(Argentina) Nicolás Bonelli	13-15
Chevrolet	Camaro Mk.6	Giavedoni Sport	75	(Argentina) Sergio Alaux	10-13
Chevrolet	Camaro Mk.6	Roberto Valle Racing Sport	83	(Argentina) Facundo Ardusso	10-15
Dodge	GTX-Cherokee	Castellano Power Team (Note: Run in conjunction with SAP Team from events 1-8 and Tomás Abdala Racing from rounds 9-15.)	4	(Argentina) Jonatan Castellano	1-11
Dodge	GTX-Cherokee	Pradecon Racing	21	(Argentina) Otto Fritzler	1-10
Dodge	GTX-Cherokee	SSB Competición	56	(Argentina) Leandro Mulet	4, 6, 10
Dodge	GTX-Cherokee	Fancio Competición	77	(Argentina) Augusto Carinelli	1-12
Dodge	GTX-Cherokee	AyP Competición	79	(Argentina) Facundo Chapur	1-14
Dodge	GTX-Cherokee	Di Meglio Motorsport	94	(Argentina) Lautaro de la Iglesia	1-10
Dodge	GTX-Cherokee	Martín Vázquez Racing	111	(Argentina) Juan Garbelino	2-4, 6
Dodge	GTX-Cherokee	Martín Vázquez Racing	123	(Argentina) Martín Vázquez	2-11
Dodge	GTX-Cherokee	Hermanos Álvarez Competición	121	(Argentina) Elio Craparo	1-12
Dodge	GTX-Cherokee	Maquin Parts Racing	127	(Argentina) Marcelo Agrelo	1-9
Dodge	GTX-Cherokee	Canning Motorsports	172	(Argentina) Santiago Álvarez	6-8
Dodge	GTX-Cherokee	JP Carrera	172	(Argentina) Santiago Álvarez	1-5
Dodge	Challenger Mk.3	Castellano Power Team	4	(Argentina) Jonatan Castellano	12-15
Dodge	Challenger Mk.3	Di Meglio Motorsport	9	(Argentina) Juan Martín Trucco	All
Dodge	Challenger Mk.3	Di Meglio Motorsport	94	(Argentina) Lautaro de la Iglesia	11-15
Dodge	Challenger Mk.3	Pradecon Racing	21	(Argentina) Otto Fritzler	11-15
Dodge	Challenger Mk.3	Fancio Competición	77	(Argentina) Augusto Carinelli	13-15
Dodge	Challenger Mk.3	Hermanos Álvarez Competición	121	(Argentina) Elio Craparo	13-15
Dodge	Challenger Mk.3	Martín Vázquez Racing	123	(Argentina) Martín Vázquez	12-15
Ford	Falcon	Maquin Parts Racing	3	(Argentina) Germán Todino	1-5
Ford	Falcon	Maquin Parts Racing	6	(Uruguay) Mauricio Lambiris	1-7
Ford	Falcon	Catalán Magni Sport	13	(Argentina) Juan Tomás Catalán Magni	1-8
Ford	Falcon	AC Competición	31	(Argentina) Gabriel Ponce de León	4, 6-7, 9-10, 12, 14
Ford	Falcon	Spataro Racing	34	(Argentina) Emiliano Spataro	1-7
Ford	Falcon	Escudería G129	34	(Argentina) Emiliano Spataro	8-13
Ford	Falcon	RUS Med Team	63	(Argentina) Nicolás Bonelli	1-5
Ford	Falcon	LCA Racing	68	(Argentina) Julián Santero	1-7
Ford	Falcon	Gurí Martínez Competición	95	(Argentina) Agustín Martínez	1-9
Ford	Falcon	Gurí Martínez Competición	177	(Argentina) Ayrton Londero	1-7
Ford	Falcon	Jalaf Competición	134	(Argentina) Matías Jalaf	2-3, 6-7
Ford	Falcon	Moriatis Competición	231	(Argentina) José Manuel Urcera	1-5
Ford	Mustang S650	Werner Competición	1	(Argentina) Mariano Werner	All
Ford	Mustang S650	Maquin Parts Racing	3	(Argentina) Germán Todino	6-16
Ford	Mustang S650	Maquin Parts Racing	6	(Uruguay) Mauricio Lambiris	8-15
Ford	Mustang S650	Catalán Magni Sport	13	(Argentina) Juan Tomás Catalán Magni	9, 11-15
Ford	Mustang S650	Escudería G129	34	(Argentina) Emiliano Spataro	15
Ford	Mustang S650	LCA Racing	68	(Argentina) Julián Santero	8-15
Ford	Mustang S650	Uranga Racing	88	(Argentina) Nicolás Trosset	1-7
Ford	Mustang S650	Martín Vázquez Racing	88	(Argentina) Nicolás Trosset	8-15
Ford	Mustang S650	Jalaf Competición	134	(Argentina) Matías Jalaf	11-12, 15
Ford	Mustang S650	Juan Pablo Gianini Racing	151	(Argentina) Juan Pablo Gianini	15
Ford	Mustang S650	Desarrollo Tecnológico Argentino Racing	157	(Argentina) Juan Bautista de Benedictis	All
Ford	Mustang S650	Gurí Martínez Competición	221	(Argentina) Omar Martínez	10, 12
Ford	Mustang S650	Moriatis Competición	231	(Argentina) José Manuel Urcera	6-15
Torino	Cherokee	Trotta Racing Team	7	(Uruguay) Marcos Landa	1-8
Torino	Cherokee	Sprint Racing	38	(Argentina) Nicolás Cotignola	1-5
Torino	Cherokee	LCA Racing	71	(Argentina) Sebastián Abella	2, 4, 6, 8-10, 12-13, 15
Torino	Cherokee	Alifraco Sport	111	(Argentina) Juan Garbelino	10
Torino	Cherokee	Enrique Candela Competición	161	(Argentina) Kevin Candela	1-6
Torino	NG	Trotta Racing Team	7	(Uruguay) Marcos Landa	9-15
Torino	NG	Trotta Racing Team	107	(Argentina) Tobías Martínez	All
Torino	NG	Sprint Racing	38	(Argentina) Nicolás Cotignola	10-11, 13-14
Torino	NG	AyP Competición	79	(Argentina) Facundo Chapur	15
Torino	NG	Alifraco Sport	111	(Argentina) Juan Garbelino	12-15
Torino	NG	Enrique Candela Competición	161	(Argentina) Kevin Candela	8-15
Toyota	Camry XV70 2022	Maquin Parts Racing	23	(Argentina) Esteban Gini	1-9
Toyota	Camry XV70 2024	Maquin Parts Racing	23	(Argentina) Esteban Gini	10-13
Toyota	Camry XV70 2024	Maquin Parts Racing	127	(Argentina) Marcelo Agrelo	10-15
Toyota	Camry XV70 2024	Dole Racing (Note: Jakos' entry was run in conjunction with Toyota Gazoo Racing Argentina.)	72	(Argentina) Martín Serrano	9, 11-15
Toyota	Camry XV70 2024	Dole Racing	122	(Argentina) Andrés Jakos	All
Toyota	Camry XV70 2024	Gurí Martínez Competición	95	(Argentina) Agustín Martínez	10-15
Toyota	Camry XV70 2024	FPA Racing	114	(Argentina) Gastón Ferrante	All

=== Changes ===
==== Pre-season ====
- The ACTC confirmed the eligibility of six new drivers to compete in Turismo Carretera in 2024 – 2023 TC Pista champion Tobías Martínez and runner-up Agustín Martínez, 2022 TC Mouras champion Rudi Bundziak, and Facundo Chapur, Lautaro de la Iglesia and Sebastián Abella on "sporting merits". Tobías Martínez will compete in a Trotta Racing Team next-generation Torino, Agustín Martínez with his family team Gurí Martínez Competición in a Ford Falcon, Chapur in an AyP Competición Dodge GTX Cherokee, De La Iglesia in a Di Meglio Motorsport Dodge, and Abella in an LCA Racing Chevy.
- 2022 series champion José Manuel Urcera will switch from a Maquin Parts Racing Torino to a Moriatis Competición Ford.
- Mauricio Lambiris will move from Alifraco Racing to Maquin Parts Racing.
- Christian Ledesma will move from Las Toscas Racing to Pradecon Racing, and will be joined by former Moriatis/Ford driver Otto Fritzler.
- Leonel Pernía will move from Las Toscas Racing to RV Racing.
- Juan Cruz Benvenuti will switch from a Trotta Racing Team Torino to an Alifraco Sport Chevrolet.
- Norberto Fontana will switch from a RUS Med Team Torino to a Hermanos Álvarez Competición Chevrolet.
- Christian Iván Ramos will switch from a RUS Med Team Torino to a Las Toscas Racing Chevrolet.
- Matías Rossi left the series after a planned move from a factory Toyota to a Pradecon Racing-run Camaro was blocked by the governing body.

==== Mid-season ====
- Prior to the sixth round at Concepción del Uruguay, the JP Carrera and Las Toscas Racing teams merged, forming Canning Motorsports.

== Rule changes ==
=== Technical ===
In an attempt to "modernize" the category following the admission of the Toyota Camry in 2022, the governing body approved the introduction of new models to the championship. 2024-model Chevrolet Camaro, Ford Mustang and Dodge Challenger bodystyles as well as a facelift to the existing Camry were ushered in, along with a fan-designed Torino concept with the goal of phasing out the existing cars over a three-year period. The new models will be built in Argentina, with the roof, rear fender and door panels imported from the manufacturers.

=== Operational ===
- The new models will see their competition number displayed on the front quarter panel behind the front wheel, as opposed to the old models where the competition number is displayed on the rear passenger window.

== Results ==
=== Season summary ===
Round		Pole position	Heat winners	Final winner	Report / Source
1	El Calafate	(Argentina) Mariano Werner (Ford Mustang)	H1: (Argentina) Mariano Werner (Ford Mustang); H2: (Argentina) Facundo Ardusso (Chevrolet Coupé SS); H3: (Argentina) Otto Fritzler (Dodge GTX Cherokee)	(Argentina) Tobías Martínez (Note: Martínez finished fifth, but was promoted to first after penalties and disqualifications were applied to the top four drivers.) (Torino TC 2024)	report
2	Viedma	(Argentina) Julián Santero (Ford Falcon)	H1: (Argentina) Julián Santero (Ford Falcon); H2: (Argentina) Mariano Werner (Ford Mustang); H3: (Argentina) Valentín Aguirre (Chevrolet Coupé SS)	(Argentina) Julián Santero (Ford Falcon)	
3	Neuquén	(Argentina) Juan Cruz Benvenuti (Chevrolet Coupé SS)	H1: (Argentina) Juan Cruz Benvenuti (Chevrolet Coupé SS); H2: (Argentina) Elio Craparo (Dodge GTX Cherokee); H3: (Argentina) José Manuel Urcera (Ford Falcon)	(Argentina) José Manuel Urcera (Ford Falcon)	
4	Toay 1	(Argentina) Diego Ciantini (Chevrolet Coupé SS)	H1: (Argentina) Diego Ciantini (Chevrolet Coupé SS); H2: (Argentina) Gastón Mazzacane (Chevrolet Coupé SS); H3: (Argentina) Agustín Martínez (Ford Falcon)	(Argentina) Mariano Werner (Ford Mustang)	
5	Termas de Río Hondo	(Argentina) Diego Ciantini (Chevrolet Coupé SS)	H1: (Argentina) Diego Ciantini (Chevrolet Coupé SS); H2: (Argentina) Gastón Mazzacane (Chevrolet Coupé SS); H3: (Argentina) Valentín Aguirre (Chevrolet Coupé SS)	(Argentina) Valentín Aguirre (Chevrolet Coupé SS)	
6	Concepción del Uruguay	(Argentina) Germán Todino (Ford Mustang)	H1: (Argentina) Germán Todino (Ford Mustang); H2: (Argentina) Julián Santero (Ford Falcon); H3: (Argentina) Marcos Quijada (Chevrolet Camaro)	(Argentina) Germán Todino (Ford Mustang)	
7	Rafaela	(Argentina) Christian Ledesma (Chevrolet Camaro)	H1: (Argentina) Christian Ledesma (Chevrolet Camaro); H2: (Argentina) Jonatan Castellano (Dodge GTX Cherokee); H3: (Argentina) Diego Ciantini (Chevrolet Coupé SS)	(Argentina) Esteban Gini (Toyota Camry 2022)	
8	Posadas	(Argentina) Nicolás Trosset (Ford Mustang)	H1: (Argentina) Nicolás Trosset (Ford Mustang); H2: (Argentina) Marcos Quijada (Chevrolet Camaro); H3: (Argentina) Julián Santero (Ford Mustang)	(Argentina) Nicolás Trosset (Ford Mustang)	
9	San Juan Villicum	Grid determined by lottery	—N/a	(Argentina) Santiago Álvarez (Chevrolet Camaro)	
10	Buenos Aires	(Argentina) Facundo Chapur (Dodge GTX Cherokee)	H1: (Argentina) Juan Cruz Benvenuti (Chevrolet Camaro); H2: (Argentina) Juan Martín Trucco (Dodge Challenger); H3: (Argentina) Julián Santero (Ford Mustang)	(Argentina) Juan Martín Trucco (Dodge Challenger)	
11	San Luis	(Argentina) Julián Santero (Ford Mustang)	H1: (Argentina) Julián Santero (Ford Mustang); H2: (Argentina) Santiago Mangoni (Chevrolet Camaro); H3: (Uruguay) Mauricio Lambiris (Ford Mustang)	(Argentina) Julián Santero (Ford Mustang)	
12	Paraná	(Argentina) Julián Santero (Ford Mustang)	H1: (Argentina) Julián Santero (Ford Mustang); H2: (Argentina) Diego Ciantini (Chevrolet Camaro); H3: (Argentina) Otto Fritzler (Dodge Challenger)	(Argentina) Diego Ciantini (Chevrolet Camaro)	
13	San Nicolás	(Argentina) Nicolás Trosset (Ford Mustang)	H1: (Argentina) Andrés Jakos (Toyota Camry 2024); H2: (Argentina) Mariano Werner (Ford Mustang); H3: (Argentina) Lautaro de la Iglesia (Dodge Challenger)	(Argentina) Mariano Werner (Ford Mustang)	
14	Toay 2	(Argentina) Mariano Werner (Ford Mustang)	H1: (Argentina) Mariano Werner (Ford Mustang); H2: (Argentina) Santiago Mangoni (Chevrolet Camaro); H3: (Argentina) Juan Martín Trucco (Dodge Challenger)	(Argentina) Mariano Werner (Ford Mustang)	
15	La Plata	(Argentina) Agustín Canapino (Chevrolet Camaro)	H1: (Argentina) Agustín Canapino (Chevrolet Camaro); H2: (Argentina) Otto Fritzler (Dodge Challenger); H3: (Argentina) Julián Santero (Ford Mustang)	(Argentina) Diego Ciantini (Chevrolet Camaro)	

=== Championship standings ===
==== Regular season standings ====
Numbers in superscript (e.g. ^{1}) refer to a drivers' heat race finishing position.

Pos.	Driver	(Santa Cruz Province, Argentina) ELC	(Río Negro Province) VIE	(Neuquén Province) NEU	(La Pampa Province) TOA1	(Santiago del Estero Province) TRH	(Entre Ríos Province) CDU	(Santa Fe Province) RAF	(Misiones Province) POS	(San Juan Province, Argentina) SJV	(Buenos Aires) BUA	(San Luis Province) SLU	(Entre Ríos Province) PAR	(Buenos Aires) SNI	(La Pampa Province) TOA2	(Buenos Aires) LAP	Total
1	(Argentina) Tobías Martínez	1^{6}															42.5
2	(Argentina) Esteban Gini	2^{9}															38
3	(Argentina) Julián Santero	4^{2}															35.5
4	(Argentina) José Manuel Urcera	3^{11}															34
5	(Argentina) Ricardo Risatti	6^{8}															30.5
6	(Uruguay) Mauricio Lambiris	5^{12}															30
7	(Argentina) Elio Craparo	7^{7}															30
8	(Argentina) Otto Fritzler	11^{1}															29
9	(Argentina) Santiago Álvarez	8^{8}															28.5
10	(Uruguay) Marcos Landa	13^{2}															26.5
11	(Argentina) Agustín Martínez	9^{13}															26
12	(Argentina) Mariano Werner	16^{1}															26
13	(Argentina) Lautaro de la Iglesia	10^{10}															25.5
14	(Argentina) Nicolás Bonelli	12^{7}															25
15	(Argentina) Diego Ciantini	14^{3}															25
16	(Argentina) Juan Bautista de Benedictis	15^{10}															20.5
17	(Argentina) Ayrton Londero	17^{9}															19
18	(Argentina) Nicolás Cotignola	18^{13}															17
19	(Argentina) Nicolás Trosset	20^{7}															17
20	(Argentina) Santiago Mangoni	19^{12}															16
21	(Argentina) Facundo Ardusso	24^{1}															16
22	(Argentina) Emiliano Spataro	21^{8}															15.5
23	(Argentina) Gastón Mazzacane	22^{11}															13
24	(Argentina) Jonatan Castellano	25^{6}															12.5
25	(Argentina) Augusto Carinelli	23^{11}															12
26	(Argentina) Germán Todino	26^{5}															12
27	(Argentina) Kevin Candela	28^{4}															10.5
28	(Argentina) Gastón Ferrante	27^{9}															9
29	(Argentina) Andrés Jakos	29^{5}															9
30	(Argentina) Marcelo Agrelo	35^{3}															7
31	(Argentina) Marcos Quijada	31^{4}															6.5
32	(Argentina) Valentín Aguirre	34^{4}															6.5
33	(Argentina) Christian Ledesma	36^{5}															6
34	(Argentina) Federico Iribarne	30^{10}															5.5
35	(Argentina) Juan Tomás Catalán Magni	33^{6}															5.5
36	(Argentina) Facundo Chapur	DSQ^{2}															4.5
37	(Argentina) Juan José Ebarlín	DSQ^{3}															4
38	(Argentina) Sergio Alaux	32^{12}															3
39	(Argentina) Juan Martín Trucco	DNS^{13}															0
40	(Argentina) Norberto Fontana	DNS^{14}															0
41	(Argentina) Juan Cruz Benvenuti	DNS^{DNS}															0
42	(Argentina) Sebastián Abella	DNS^{DNS}															0
43	(Argentina) Martín Vázquez	WD^{WD}															0
Pos.	Driver	(Santa Cruz Province, Argentina) ELC	(Río Negro Province) VIE	(Neuquén Province) NEU	(La Pampa Province) TOA1	(Santiago del Estero Province) TRH	(Entre Ríos Province) CDU	(Santa Fe Province) RAF	(Misiones Province) POS	(San Juan Province, Argentina) SJV	(Buenos Aires) BUA	(San Luis Province) SLU	(Entre Ríos Province) PAR	(Buenos Aires) SNI	(La Pampa Province) TOA2	(Buenos Aires) LAP	Total
