= 2018 1000km Buenos Aires =

Motor race for Turismo Carretera held in 2018

(Argentina) 2018 1000km Buenos Aires
Event Information
- Round 9 of 15 in the 2018
- Date: 17–19 August 2018
- Location: Buenos Aires, Argentina
- Venue: Autódromo Oscar y Juan Gálvez

Results
Race 1
Distance	178 laps	1,005.878 km
Winner	(Argentina) Agustín Canapino (Argentina) Federico Alonso (Argentina) Martín Ponte; Jet Racing	5:35:10.931

The 2018 1000 km Buenos Aires was a motor race for Turismo Carretera held on the weekend of 17–19 August 2018. The event was held at the Autódromo Oscar y Juan Gálvez in Buenos Aires, Argentina and consisted of one race of 1,005 kilometres. It was the ninth round of fifteen in the 2018 Turismo Carretera championship, as well as the eleventh and most recent staging of the 1000 km Buenos Aires.

== Background ==
As opposed to the 2017 edition of the race, teams were required to enter three drivers per car as opposed to either two or three – one series regular (denoted by a green light inside the car) and two 'guest' co-drivers (denoted by a blue and red light). The grid was determined by the championship standings prior to the event as opposed to a regular qualifying session, however Matías Rossi started from the back due to accumulation of penalties. Following controversy over a two-lap penalty for engine changes the previous year, entries were allowed one 'joker' engine change without penalty. Entries were also allowed to resume their participation in the race if they received outside assistance, which resulted in retirement or exclusion in regular events.

Prior to the race, two changes were made to the entry list. Aldo Ortíz was entered to race for Indecar Racing No. 99, but was injured in a crash in a TC Pista race and was replaced with Junior Solmi. Santiago Andreoli was also injured in a crash in TC Pista, and his UR Racing No. 44 crew were allowed to compete with only two drivers as they failed to source a replacement driver.

Julia Ballario, competing for Neuquén Energía No. 33, was the only female driver in the field.

== Results ==
=== Race ===
Pos.	No.	Driver	Team	Car	Laps	Time/Retired	Grid	Pts.
1	1	(Argentina) Agustín Canapino (Argentina) Federico Alonso (Argentina) Martín Ponte	Jet Racing	Chevrolet Coupé SS	178	5:35:10.931	7	90
2	36	(Argentina) Leonel Pernía (Argentina) Juan Cruz Benvenuti (Argentina) Emmanuel Pérez Bravo	Hamilton Laboritto Jrs. Racing	Torino Cherokee	178	+2.923	11	85
3	2	(Argentina) Facundo Ardusso (Argentina) Federico Pérez (Argentina) Tomás Urretavizcaya	Renault Sport Torino Team	Torino Cherokee	178	+3.474	2	80
4	75	(Argentina) Sergio Alaux (Argentina) Pablo Costanzo (Argentina) Juan Pablo Barucca	Unión Platense Sport	Chevrolet Coupé SS	178	+3.904	29	75
5	113	(Argentina) Luciano Ventricelli (Argentina) Ernesto Bessone (Argentina) Claudio Bisceglia	Gurí Martínez Competición	Ford Falcon	178	+9.991	31	72
6	22	(Argentina) Julián Santero (Argentina) Andrés Jakos (Argentina) Mario Valle	Dole Racing	Dodge GTX Cherokee	178	+12.684	14	70
7	88	(Argentina) Nicolás Trosset (Argentina) Agustín Herrera (Argentina) Sebastián Salse	Maquin Parts Racing	Dodge GTX Cherokee	178	+12.955	13	68
8	12	(Argentina) Guillermo Ortelli (Argentina) Pedro Gentile (Argentina) Diego Ciantini	JP Carrera	Chevrolet Coupé SS	178	+31.303	5	66
9	17	(Argentina) Emanuel Moriatis (Argentina) Federico Lynn (Argentina) Ramiro Dailoff	Martínez Competición	Ford Falcon	177	+1 lap	27	64
10	7	(Argentina) José Manuel Urcera (Argentina) Mariano Altuna (Argentina) Facundo Della Motta	Las Toscas Racing	Chevrolet Coupé SS	176	+2 laps	23	62
11	9	(Argentina) Jonatan Castellano (Argentina) Joel Gassmann (Argentina) Gustavo Micheloud	Castellano Power Team	Dodge GTX Cherokee	176	+2 laps	1	60
12	6	(Uruguay) Mauricio Lambiris (Argentina) Omar Martínez (Argentina) Lautaro de la Iglesia	Gurí Martínez Competición	Ford Falcon	174	+4 laps	8	58
13	32	(Argentina) Nicolás González (Argentina) Juan Cruz Talamona (Argentina) Matías Canapino	AyP Competición	Torino Cherokee	171	+7 laps	19	56
14	111	(Argentina) Juan Manuel Silva (Argentina) Oscar Sánchez (Argentina) José Savino	CM Sport	Ford Falcon	169	+9 laps	20	54
15	99	(Argentina) Matías Jalaf (Argentina) Juan Garbelino (Argentina) Junior Solmi	Indecar Racing	Ford Falcon	169	+9 laps	25	52
16	44	(Argentina) Sebastián Diruscio (Argentina) Lautaro Lanci	UR Racing	Dodge GTX Cherokee	165	+13 laps	33	50
17	133	(Argentina) Valentín Aguirre (Argentina) Luis José di Palma (Argentina) Santiago Álvarez	JP Carrera	Dodge GTX Cherokee	165	+13 laps	28	48
18	29	(Argentina) Martín Serrano (Argentina) Jonathan Vázquez (Argentina) Fernando Iglesias Jr.	Dose Competición	Chevrolet Coupé SS	165	+13 laps	43	46
19	45	(Argentina) Nicolás Cotignola (Argentina) Luciano Cotignola (Argentina) Nicolás Vidal	Sprint Racing	Torino Cherokee	158	+20 laps	42	44
20	68	(Argentina) Mariano Werner (Argentina) Marcos Muchiut (Argentina) Adrián Oubiña	Werner Competición	Ford Falcon	156	+22 laps	3	42
21	55	(Argentina) Santiago Mangoni (Argentina) Diego Martínez (Argentina) Lucas Valle	Mangoni Motorsport	Chevrolet Coupé SS	156	+22 laps	26	40
22	26	(Argentina) Juan José Ebarlín (Argentina) Rafael Verna (Argentina) Laureano Campanera	Donto Racing	Chevrolet Coupé SS	153	+23 laps	30	38
23	33	(Argentina) Camilo Echevarría (Argentina) Julia Ballario (Argentina) Sebastián Abella	Neuquén Energía	Chevrolet Coupé SS	150	+28 laps	40	36
24	27	(Argentina) Juan Pablo Gianini (Argentina) Marcelo Agrelo (Argentina) Esteban Agustín Cístola	JPG Racing	Ford Falcon	148	+30 laps	9	34
25	157	(Argentina) Juan Bautista de Benedictis (Argentina) Damián Markel (Argentina) Franco de Benedictis	MG Racing SA	Ford Falcon	147	+31 laps	15	32
26	98	(Argentina) Nicolás Bonelli (Argentina) Agustín de Brabandere (Argentina) Germán Todino	Bonelli Competición	Ford Falcon	142	+36 laps	16	30
27	4	(Argentina) Christian Ledesma (Argentina) Augusto Carinelli (Argentina) José Rasuk	Las Toscas Racing	Chevrolet Coupé SS	137	+41 laps	10	28
28	19	(Argentina) Norberto Fontana (Argentina) Juan Pipkin (Argentina) José Ciantini	Alifraco Sport	Chevrolet Coupé SS	136	+42 laps	24	26
29	15	(Argentina) Matías Rossi (Argentina) Gastón Ferrante (Argentina) Federico Iribarne	Nova Racing	Ford Falcon	135	+43 laps	45	24
30	8	(Argentina) Juan Martín Trucco (Argentina) Lucas Panarotti (Argentina) Juan Augusto Ronconi	JMT Motorsport	Dodge GTX Cherokee	135	+43 laps	4	22
31	124	(Argentina) Nicolás Pezzucchi (Argentina) Alejandro Weimann (Argentina) Eduardo Bracco	UR Racing	Dodge GTX Cherokee	134	+44 laps	32	18
32	53	(Argentina) Juan Tomás Catalán Magni (Argentina) Matías Guiffrey (Argentina) Sebastián Reynoso	CM Sport	Dodge GTX Cherokee	128	+50 laps	22	18
33	10	(Argentina) Emiliano Spataro (Argentina) Matías Rodríguez (Argentina) Elio Craparo	Renault Sport Torino Team	Torino Cherokee	124	+54 laps	18	18
34	24	(Argentina) Gabriel Ponce de León (Argentina) Juan Cruz di Palma (Argentina) Martín Vázquez	Ponce de León Racing	Ford Falcon	120	+58 laps	17	18
35	20	(Argentina) Carlos Okulovich (Argentina) Sebastián Gómez (Argentina) Jorge Trebbiani	Maquin Parts Racing	Torino Cherokee	112	+66 laps	21	18
36	5	(Argentina) Gastón Mazzacane (Argentina) Daniel Nefa (Argentina) Gastón Rossi	Dole Racing	Chevrolet Coupé SS	105	+73 laps	6	18
37	43	(Argentina) Christian Dose (Argentina) Juan José Tomasello (Argentina) Juan Manuel Tomasello	Dose Competición	Chevrolet Coupé SS	103	+75 laps	39	18
38	47	(Argentina) Leandro Mulet (Argentina) Ramiro Granara (Argentina) Nicolás Blanco	RTM Competición	Dodge GTX Cherokee	97	+81 laps	41	18
39	79	(Argentina) Mathías Nolesi (Argentina) Nicolás Montanari (Argentina) Lucas Ferreira	Nolesi Spirit Team	Ford Falcon	92	+86 laps	38	18
40	77	(Argentina) Juan Martín Bruno (Argentina) Juan Scoltore (Argentina) Luciano Trappa	JP Carrera	Dodge GTX Cherokee	69	+109 laps	35	18
41	46	(Argentina) Facundo Gil Bicella (Argentina) Roberto Videle (Argentina) Mariano Oyhanart	Alifraco Sport	Dodge GTX Cherokee	56	+122 laps	44	15
42	37	(Argentina) Diego de Carlo (Argentina) Antonino Sganga (Argentina) Gastón Todino	LRD Racing Team	Chevrolet Coupé SS	55	+123 laps	37	15
43	63	(Argentina) Próspero Bonelli (Argentina) Marcelo Videle (Argentina) Lucas Carabajal	Rudas Competición	Chevrolet Coupé SS	36	+142 laps	34	15
44	18	(Argentina) Juan Marcos Angelini (Argentina) Ricardo Degoumois (Argentina) Lucas Granja	UR Racing	Dodge GTX Cherokee	1	+177 laps	12	15
EXC	116	(Argentina) Alan Ruggiero (Argentina) Flavio Bortot (Argentina) Tomás Deharbe	Azul Sport Team	Torino Cherokee	?	Dangerous driving	36	
Fastest lap set by Luis José di Palma – 1:35.140 on Lap 91

Previous race: 2018 Carrera del Millón	Turismo Carretera; 2018 season	Next race: 2018 Turismo Carretera Paraná round
Previous race: 2017 1000km Buenos Aires	1000 km Buenos Aires	Next race: none
