= 2017 1000km Buenos Aires =

Motor race for Turismo Carretera held in 2017

(Argentina) 2017 1000 km Buenos Aires
Event Information
- Round 8 of 15 in the 2017
- Date: 4–6 August 2017
- Location: Buenos Aires, Argentina
- Venue: Autódromo Oscar y Juan Gálvez

Results
Race 1
Distance	178 laps	1,005.878 km
Winner	(Argentina) Juan Manuel Silva (Argentina) Juan Tomás Catalán Magni; CM Motorsport	5:30:55.166

The 2017 1000 km Buenos Aires was a motor race for Turismo Carretera held on the weekend of 4–6 August 2017. The event was held at the Autódromo Oscar y Juan Gálvez in Buenos Aires, Argentina and consisted of one race of 1,005 kilometres. It was the eighth round of fifteen in the 2017 Turismo Carretera championship, as well as the tenth staging of the 1000 km Buenos Aires.

== Report ==
=== Background ===
The 2017 1000km Buenos Aires was the first staging of the race as a Turismo Carretera event, but wasn't the first multi-driver enduro in the modern era of Turismo Carretera – a 500 km race held at the Autódromo Hermanos Emiliozzi the previous year, won by Matías Rossi and Esteban Guerrieri, was the first since 1996. Similar to Supercars Championships' endurance driver rules since 2010, the regular season drivers could not partner up and had to be joined by one or two 'guest' co-drivers. Regular drivers were denoted by a green light inside the car, with the first guest denoted by a blue light and the second guest by a red light.

The race was held over 178 laps (1,005 km), but had a time-certain limit of 6 hours. Outside assistance rules were relaxed for the event in that entries could resume participation in the race if they received it, but penalties for technical changes were heavily tightened – entries would receive a 1-lap penalty for changing a cylinder or engine cover, and a 2-lap penalty for changing an entire engine. The grid was set by the championship standings order prior to the event, however Mariano Werner started from the back of the grid for accumulation of penalties as did cars No. 7, #8 and No. 31 for taking engine penalties.

=== Race ===
Despite being spun by Gastón Mazzacane inside the first ten laps, Juan Manuel Silva and Juan Tomás Catalán Magni emerged the winners of the 1000 km Buenos Aires having taken the lead after the last pit-stop cycle. Guillermo Ortelli – whose co-driver Diego Martínez both suffered a high-speed spin mid-race and earned the team a 20-second post-race time-penalty for not changing the co-driver light – inherited second late in the race after both long-time leader Mariano Werner's co-driver Juan Ronconi retired with an oil leak five laps from the end, and Juan Martín Trucco's (who completed the first four-and-a-quarter hours of the race by himself) co-driver Elio Craparo broke down three laps from the finish; although it was likely that the No. 1 Chevrolet would have scored a podium regardless having finished with strong late-race pace. Juan Marcos Angelini finished third on the road, but received a 2-lap penalty for an engine change and elevated José Manuel Urcera – who had completed the whole race on the same set of tyres – to the podium. Facundo Ardusso was classified fourth, and ultimately the last car on the lead lap as Esteban Gini was penalised 3 laps for not completing the mandatory number of driver changes.

== Results ==
=== Race ===
Pos.	No.	Driver	Team	Car	Laps	Time/Retired	Grid	Pts.
1	111	(Argentina) Juan Manuel Silva (Argentina) Juan Tomás Catalán Magni	CM Motorsport	Ford Falcon	178	5:30:55.166	3	90
2	1	(Argentina) Guillermo Ortelli (Argentina) Valentín Aguirre (Argentina) Diego Martínez	JP Carrera	Chevrolet Coupé SS	178	+20.524	1	85
3	151	(Argentina) José Manuel Urcera (Argentina) Mariano Altuna	Las Toscas Racing	Chevrolet Coupé SS	178	+33.894	14	80
4	5	(Argentina) Facundo Ardusso (Argentina) Tomás Urretavizcaya	Renault Sport Torino Team	Torino Cherokee	178	+1:14.727	5	75
5	33	(Argentina) Juan José Ebarlín (Argentina) Laureano Campanera (Argentina) Marcos di Palma	Donto Racing	Chevrolet Coupé SS	177	+1 lap	24	72
6	52	(Argentina) Carlos Okulovich (Argentina) Juan Pablo Barucca (Argentina) Nazareno López	Maquin Parts Racing	Torino Cherokee	177	+1 lap	37	70
7	7	(Argentina) Juan Marcos Angelini (Argentina) Luciano Ventricelli (Argentina) Ricardo Degoumois	UR Racing	Dodge GTX Cherokee	176	+2 laps	42	68
8	11	(Argentina) Jonatan Castellano (Argentina) Jerónimo Teti	Castellano Power Team	Dodge GTX Cherokee	176	+2 laps	9	66
9	42	(Argentina) Esteban Gini (Argentina) Jonathan Vázquez	Alifraco Sport	Chevrolet Coupé SS	175	+3 laps	30	64
10	9	(Argentina) Juan Martín Trucco (Argentina) Elio Craparo	JMT Motorsport	Dodge GTX Cherokee	175	Mechanical	7	62
11	24	(Argentina) Nicolás Bonelli (Argentina) Agustín de Brabandere	Bonelli Competición	Ford Falcon	174	+4 laps	18	60
12	3	(Argentina) Mariano Werner (Argentina) Marcos Muchiut (Argentina) Juan Ronconi	Werner Competición	Ford Falcon	173	Oil leak	41	58
13	28	(Argentina) Emiliano Spataro (Argentina) Juan Bautista de Benedictis	Renault Sport Torino Team	Torino Cherokee	172	+6 laps	20	56
14	10	(Argentina) Gastón Mazzacane (Argentina) Daniel Nefa	Dole Racing	Chevrolet Coupé SS	166	+12 laps	6	54
15	19	(Argentina) Juan Pablo Gianini (Argentina) Marcelo Agrelo (Argentina) Kevin Candela	JPG Racing	Ford Falcon	165	+13 laps	16	52
16	18	(Argentina) Luis José di Palma (Argentina) Javier Jack (Argentina) Nicolás Dianda	Laboritto Jrs. Racing	Torino Cherokee	164	+14 laps	8	50
17	116	(Argentina) Alan Ruggiero (Argentina) Tomás Gregorio Deharbe (Argentina) Juan Cruz Benvenuti	Laboritto Jrs. Racing	Torino Cherokee	163	+15 laps	36	48
18	72	(Argentina) Martín Serrano (Argentina) Alonso Etchebest (Argentina) Facundo Della Motta	Dole Racing	Chevrolet Coupé SS	158	+20 laps	28	46
19	2	(Argentina) Matías Rossi (Argentina) Gastón Rossi	Nova Racing	Ford Falcon	156	Puncture damage	2	44
20	82	(Uruguay) Mauricio Lambiris (Argentina) Gastón Ferrante (Argentina) Lautaro de la Iglesia	Martínez Competición	Ford Falcon	152	+26 laps	12	42
21	77	(Argentina) Juan Martín Bruno (Argentina) Juan Scoltore	Dole Racing	Dodge GTX Cherokee	151	+27 laps	38	40
22	14	(Argentina) Norberto Fontana (Argentina) José Ciantini (Argentina) Nicolás Trosset	JP Carrera	Chevrolet Coupé SS	150	+28 laps	13	38
23	99	(Argentina) Matías Jalaf (Argentina) Daniel Vázquez (Argentina) Juan Garbelino	Indecar Racing	Torino Cherokee	145	Mechanical	22	36
24	43	(Argentina) Christian Ledesma (Argentina) Walter Hernández (Argentina) Augusto Carinelli	Las Toscas Racing	Chevrolet Coupé SS	132	Crash	26	34
25	39	(Argentina) Camilo Echevarría (Argentina) Diego Azar (Argentina) Germán Todino	Alifraco Sport	Chevrolet Coupé SS	132	+46 laps	31	32
26	8	(Argentina) Sergio Alaux (Argentina) Waldemar Coronas (Argentina) Pablo Costanzo	Donto Racing	Chevrolet Coupé SS	130	+48 laps	43	30
27	45	(Argentina) Facundo Gil Bicella (Argentina) Roberto Videle (Argentina) Mariano Oyhanart	Alifraco Sport	Dodge GTX Cherokee	130	+48 laps	40	28
28	40	(Argentina) Christian Dose (Argentina) Marcelo Videle (Argentina) "Patán"	Dose Competición	Chevrolet Coupé SS	129	Crash	34	26
29	17	(Argentina) Emanuel Moriatis (Argentina) Joel Gassmann (Argentina) Ayrton Londero	Martínez Competición	Ford Falcon	128	+50 laps	11	24
30	68	(Argentina) Julián Santero (Argentina) Aldo Ortíz (Argentina) Federico Paoloni	Dole Racing	Torino Cherokee	123	Mechanical	35	22
31	23	(Argentina) Gabriel Ponce de León (Argentina) Federico Pérez	Ponce de León Racing	Ford Falcon	118	+60 laps	15	18
32	101	(Argentina) Lionel Ugalde (Argentina) Ernesto Bessone (Argentina) Matías Rodríguez	Ugalde Competición	Ford Falcon	117	+61 laps	17	18
33	69	(Argentina) Pedro Gentile (Argentina) Cristian Beraldi (Argentina) Sebastián Gómez	Alifraco Sport	Chevrolet Coupé SS	99	Crash	27	18
34	31	(Argentina) Leonel Pernía (Argentina) Santiago Andreoli (Argentina) Emmanuel Pérez Bravo	Dose Competición	Chevrolet Coupé SS	95	+83 laps	44	18
35	27	(Argentina) Omar Martínez (Argentina) Nicolás Pezzucchi (Argentina) Juan José Suárez	Martínez Competición	Ford Falcon	94	+84 laps	19	18
36	38	(Argentina) Diego de Carlo (Argentina) Emmanuel Alifraco (Argentina) Gastón Todino	Jet Racing	Chevrolet Coupé SS	86	Engine	32	18
37	79	(Argentina) Mathías Nolesi (Argentina) Lucas Ferreira	Nolesi Spirit Team	Ford Falcon	83	+95 laps	29	18
38	55	(Argentina) Santiago Mangoni (Argentina) Juan José Tomasello (Argentina) Enzo Pieraligi	Dose Competición	Chevrolet Coupé SS	74	Mechanical	21	18
39	6	(Argentina) Agustín Canapino (Argentina) Federico Alonso	Jet Racing	Chevrolet Coupé SS	73	Engine	4	18
40	129	(Argentina) Mauro Giallombardo (Argentina) Leonel Sotro (Argentina) Adrián Oubiña	Werner Competición	Ford Falcon	73	+105 laps	10	18
41	100	(Argentina) Sebastián Diruscio (Argentina) Diego Verriello (Argentina) Santiago Álvarez	SGV Racing	Dodge GTX Cherokee	66	+112 laps	39	15
42	30	(Argentina) Nicolás González (Argentina) Damián Markel (Argentina) Oscar Sánchez	AyP Competición	Torino Cherokee	66	+112 laps	23	15
43	63	(Argentina) Próspero Bonelli (Argentina) Maximiliano Juan	Bonelli Competición	Ford Falcon	39	Mechanical	25	15
44	144	(Argentina) José Savino (Argentina) Pablo Delponte (Argentina) Maximiliano López	Savino Sport	Ford Falcon	7	Crash	33	15
WD	107	(Argentina) Nicolás Cotignola (Argentina) Luciano Cotignola (Argentina) Franco Ércoli	Sprint Racing	Torino Cherokee		Withdrew		
Fastest lap set by Mariano Werner – 1:36.215 on Lap 104

== Standings ==
Drivers' Championship

Pos.	Driver	Pts	Gap
1	(Argentina) José Luis di Palma	262	
2	(Argentina) Facundo Ardusso	255	-7
3	(Argentina) Juan Manuel Silva	244.5	-17.5
4	(Argentina) Gastón Mazzacane	236	-26
5	(Argentina) Jonatan Castellano	228.5	-33.5

- Note: Only the top five positions are included.

Previous race: 2017 Turismo Carretera Paraná round	Turismo Carretera; 2017 season	Next race: 2017 Turismo Carretera Termas de Río Hondo round
Previous race: 1972 1000 km Buenos Aires	1000 km Buenos Aires	Next race: 2018 1000km Buenos Aires
