= Diego Ciantini =

Racing driver from Argentina

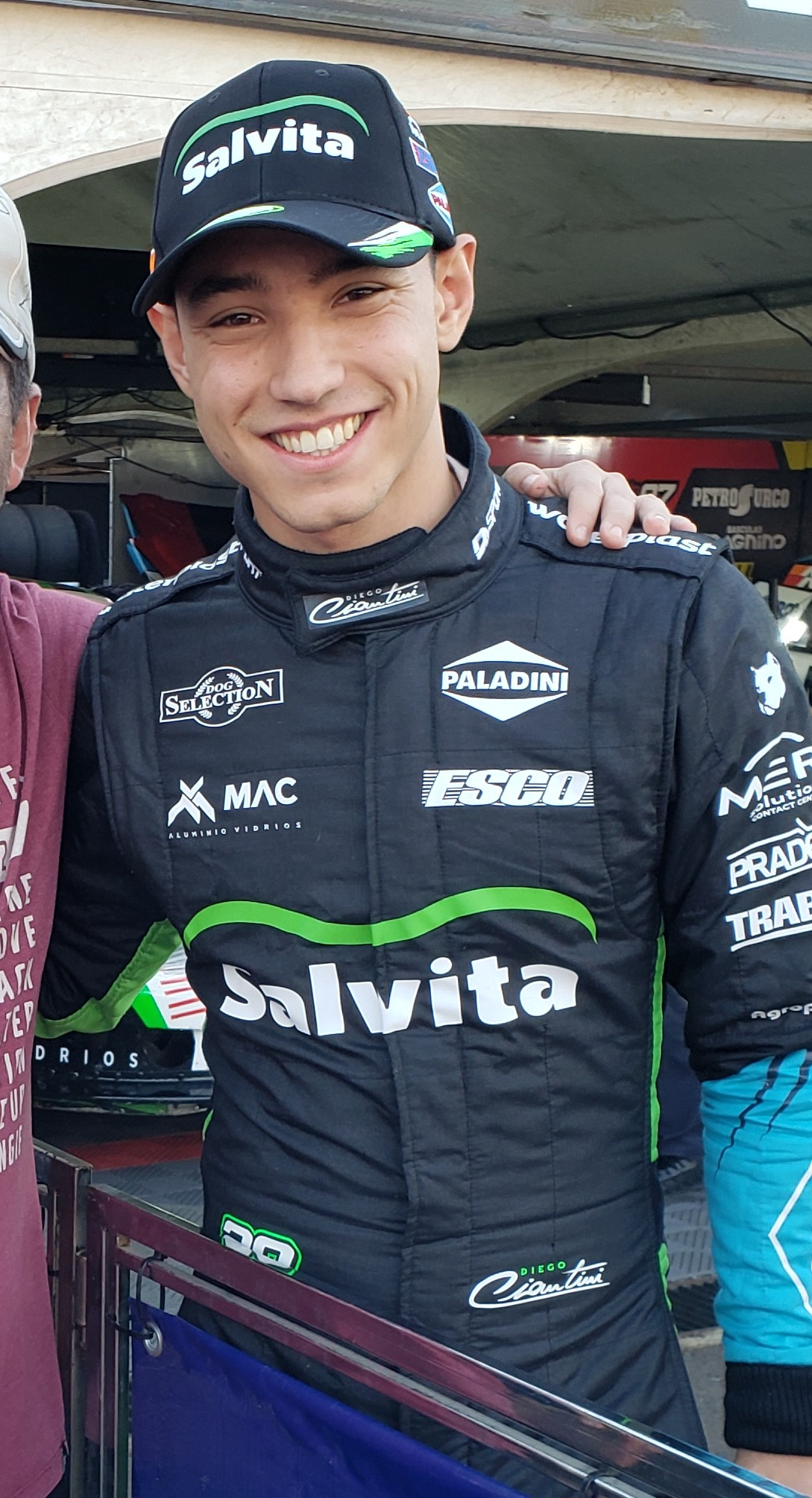
- Ciantini in 2022
- Nationality: Argentine
- Born: 21 July 1998 (age 28) Balcarce, Buenos Aires Province, Argentina

Turismo Carretera
- Years active: 2020–present
- Teams: Renault Sport Torino Team; JP Carrera; Di Meglio Motorsport; LRD Performance
- Starts: 52
- Wins: 1 (Finals); 3 (Heats)
- Poles: 1
- Fastest laps: 2
- Best finish: 10th in 2020

Previous series
- 2014–2015 2015, 2017 2016 2016 2017 2018–2019 2020 2021–2023: Fórmula Metropolitana; TC2000 Series; Italian F4 Championship; ADAC Formula 4 TC Mouras; TC Pista; Súper TC 2000; TC Pick Up

Championship titles
- 2019: TC Pista

Diego José Ciantini (born 21 July 1998) is a racing driver from Argentina.

== Biography ==
Ciantini began racing in low-level Argentine open-wheeler series in 2014, before stepping up to the second tier of domestic touring cars in 2015. In 2016, he moved to Europe to contest Formula 4 in Italy and Germany with Jenzer Motorsport, finishing on the podium once at Imola in a red-flag finish caused by an accident he was involved in. He moved back to Argentina in 2017 and joined the Turismo Carretera pyramid, competing in TC Mouras and finishing ninth with two wins before stepping up to TC Pista in 2018, winning the championship the following season.

Ciantini advanced to Turismo Carretera in 2020, scoring a top-five at Autódromo Oscar y Juan Gálvez but failing to qualify for the playoffs. He also returned to touring cars at the end of the year, competing in the last four rounds of Súper TC 2000 and scoring a podium in Paraná. He won his first Turismo Carretera race at Autódromo Provincia de La Pampa in 2023.

== Personal life ==
Ciantini comes from a potato farming and producing family. His father, José Ciantini, raced in Turismo Carretera between 1993 and 2012, winning three Finals for Dodge.

== Career results ==
=== Summary ===
Season	Series	Position	Car	Team
2014	Fórmula Metropolitana	29th	Crespi–Renault	Scuderia Ramini
2015	Fórmula Metropolitana	**3rd**	Crespi–Renault	WCC Squadra
2015	TC2000 Series	20th	Honda Civic Mk.9	PSG-16 Team
2016	Italian F4 Championship	20th	Tatuus–Abarth F4 T-014	Jenzer Motorsport
2016	ADAC Formula 4 Championship	NC	Tatuus–Abarth F4 T-014	Jenzer Motorsport
2017	TC Mouras	9th	Chevrolet Coupé SS	JP Carrera
2017	TC2000 Series	13th	Chevrolet Cruze J300; Chevrolet Cruze J400	Pro Racing
2018	TC Pista	4th	Chevrolet Coupé SS	JP Carrera
2019	TC Pista	**1st**	Chevrolet Coupé SS	Las Toscas Racing; JP Carrera
2020	Turismo Carretera	19th	Torino Cherokee	Trotta Racing Team
2020–21	Súper TC2000	20th	Honda Civic Mk.10; Toyota Corolla E210	RAM Racing Factory; Midas Carrera Team
2021	Turismo Carretera	22nd	Dodge GTX-Cherokee	JP Carrera
2021	TC Pick Up	15th	Fiat Toro; Toyota Hilux	Midas Carrera Team
2022	Turismo Carretera	25th	Dodge GTX-Cherokee; Chevrolet Coupé SS	Di Meglio Motorsport; LRD Performance
2022	TC Pick Up	24th	Toyota Hilux	Midas Carrera Team
2023	Turismo Carretera	19th	Chevrolet Coupé SS	JP Carrera
2023	TC Pick Up	**2nd**	Volkswagen Amarok	JP Carrera
2024	Turismo Carretera	**3rd**	Chevrolet Coupé SS; Chevrolet Camaro Mk.6	JP Carrera; Canning Motorsports
2025	Turismo Carretera	47th	Chevrolet Camaro Mk.6	Canning Motorsports
2025	Turismo Nacional – Class 3	33rd	Ford Focus Mk.3	GC Competición
2025	Trans-Am Series – National TA2	38th	Ford Mustang S650	Memo Corse
2026	TCR South America		Hyundai Elantra N TCR	Hyundai Motorsport
2026	TC Pick Up		TBC	Gurí Martínez Competición

=== Complete Italian F4 Championship results ===
(key) (Races in bold indicate pole position) (Races in italics indicate fastest lap)

Year	Entrant	1	2	3	4	5	6	7	8	9	10	11	12	13	14	15	16	17	18	19	20	21	22	23	DC	Points
2016	Jenzer Motorsport	MIS; 1; 11	MIS; 2; 10	MIS; 3	MIS; 4 Ret	ADR; 1; 16	ADR; 2; 9	ADR; 3	ADR; 4; 12	IMO1; 1; 4	IMO1; 2; 8	IMO1; 3; 3	MUG; 1 Ret	MUG; 2; 13	MUG; 3; 18	VAL; 1 Ret	VAL; 2; 16	VAL; 3; 12	IMO2; 1; 5	IMO2; 2 Ret	IMO2; 3; 15	MNZ; 1 Ret	MNZ; 2; 20	MNZ; 3 DNS	20th	33.5

=== Complete ADAC Formula 4 Championship results ===
(key) (Races in bold indicate pole position) (Races in italics indicate fastest lap)

Year	Entrant	1	2	3	4	5	6	7	8	9	10	11	12	13	14	15	16	17	18	19	20	21	22	23	24	DC	Points
2016	Jenzer Motorsport	OSC1; 1	OSC1; 2	OSC1; 3	SAC; 1	SAC; 2	SAC; 3	LAU; 1; 20	LAU; 2; 24	LAU; 3; 18	OSC2; 1	OSC2; 2	OSC2; 3	RBR; 1; 13	RBR; 2; 30	RBR; 3 Ret	NÜR; 1	NÜR; 2	NÜR; 3	ZAN; 1	ZAN; 2	ZAN; 3	HOC; 1; 15	HOC; 2; 23	HOC; 3; 28	36th	0

=== Turismo Carretera results ===
(key) (Races in bold indicate pole position) (Races in italics indicate fastest lap) (Numbers in ^{superscript} indicate heat race results)

Year	Team	Car	1	2	3	4	5	6	7	8	9	10	11	12	13	14	15	Pos.	Pts
2018	JP Carrera	Chevrolet Coupé SS	VIE	NEU	SLU	CDU	POS	CCD	TRH	RAF	BUA; 8	PAR	VMC	TOA	OLA	SJV	SNI	IE	-
2020	Trotta Racing Team	Torino Cherokee	VIE; 8^{4}	NEU; 27^{8}	SNI1; 40^{6}	SNI2; 18^{11}	BUA1; 7^{3}	SNI3; 36^{5}	LPL1; 7^{3}	LPL2; 8^{3}	BUA2; 5^{2}	SJV1; 27^{11}	SJV2; WD					19th	206
2021	JP Carrera	Dodge GTX Cherokee	LPL; 27^{15}	BUA; 35^{5}	SNI1; 17^{7}	CDU; 2^{1}	PAR; 31^{16}	SNI2; 36^{15}	CCD; 5^{2}	SJV1; 21	SJV2; 36^{13}	POS; 27^{3}	RAF; 9^{6}	SLU; 3^{1}	VIE; 39^{4}	TOA; 11^{7}	SJV3; 32^{10}	20th	252.75
2022	Di Meglio Motorsport LRD Performance	Dodge GTX Cherokee Chevrolet Coupé SS	VIE; 32^{11}	NEU; 15^{4}	CDU; 13^{5}	TOA1; 14^{11}	TRH; 7^{3}	RAF; 22^{11}	CCD; 15^{10}	POS; 12^{6}	SJV1; 37	PAR; 38^{8}	SLU; 37^{11}	CMR; 28^{6}	SNI; 17^{7}	TOA2; 15^{10}	SJV2; 31^{7}	25th	231.5
2023	JP Carrera	Chevrolet Coupé SS	VIE; 29^{3}	NEU; 30^{8}	TOA1; 1	ELC; 36^{4}	CDU; 4^{2}	TRH; 2^{1}	RAF1; 20^{16}	POS; 45^{3}	SJV1; 52	BUA; 45^{3}	SLU; 21^{6}	SNI; 7^{3}	RAF2; 43^{1}	TOA2; 31^{16}	SJV2; 32^{7}	19th	235.5
2024	JP Carrera Canning Motorsports	Chevrolet Coupé SS Chevrolet Camaro Mk.6	ELC; 14^{3}	VIE; 31^{5}	NEU; 6^{3}	TOA1; 2^{1}	TRH; 35^{1}	CDU; 7^{2}	RAF; 2^{1}	POS; 15^{2}	SJV; 16	BUA; 5^{3}	SLU; 4^{2}	PAR; 1^{1}	SNI; 33^{DSQ}	TOA2; 9^{7}	LPL; 1^{3}	3rd	447.5
2025	Canning Motorsports	Chevrolet Camaro Mk.6	VIE; 23^{DSQ}	ELC; 42^{12}	NEU; C^{11}	TOA1; 7	TRH; 20^{16}	AGC; 38^{10}	POS	CDU	SJV	BUA	SLU	SNI	PAR	TOA2	LPL	47th	60.5

*Season in progress.
