= 1000 km Buenos Aires =

(Argentina) 1000km Buenos Aires
- Race Information
Venue	Autódromo Oscar y Juan Gálvez
Number of times held	11
First held	1954
- Race Format
- Race 1
Laps	178
Distance	1,000 km
- Last Event (2018)
- Overall Winner
(Argentina) Agustín Canapino (Argentina) Federico Alonso (Argentina) Martín Ponte	Jet Racing
- Race Winners
(Argentina) Agustín Canapino (Argentina) Federico Alonso (Argentina) Martín Ponte	Jet Racing

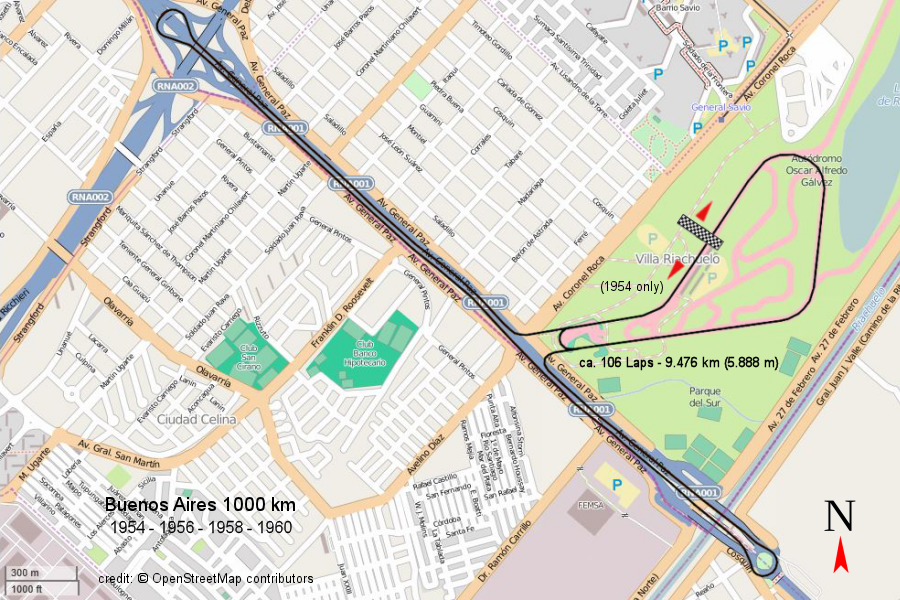
Circuit Callejero - Buenos Aires 1000km (1954)

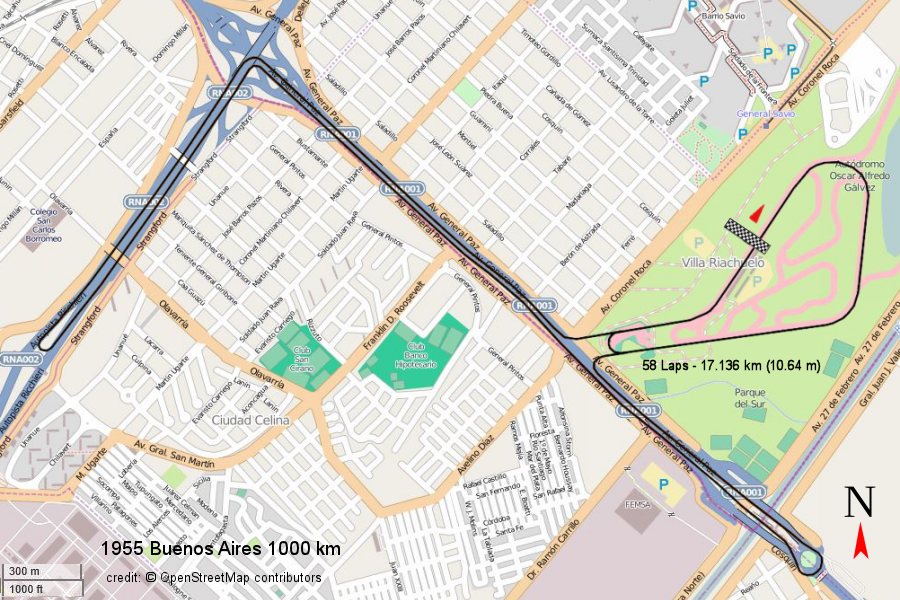
Circuit Callejero - Buenos Aires 1000km (1955)

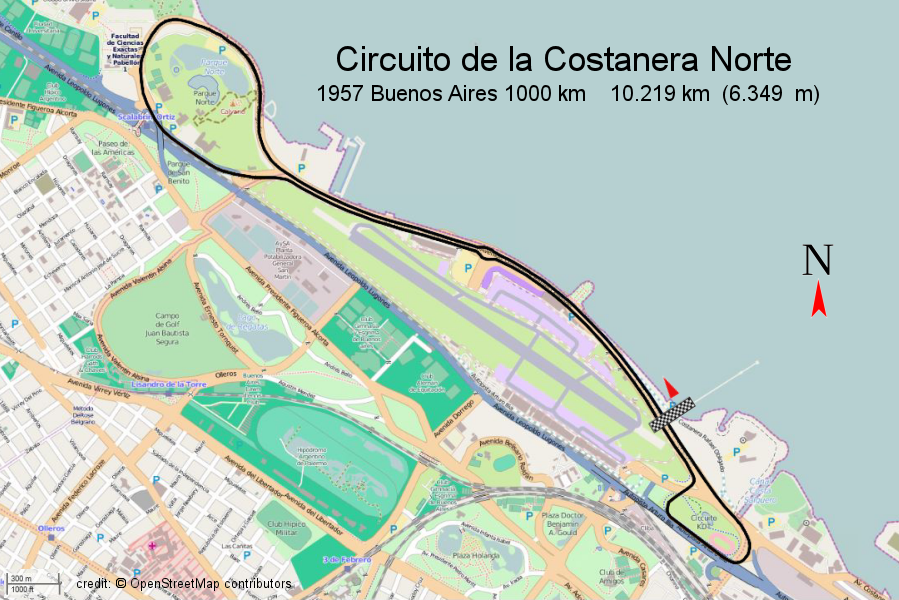
Circuit Costanera Norte - Buenos Aires 1000 km (1957)

Circuit-galvez-1968-No15

The 1000 km Buenos Aires was an endurance sports car and stock car event held in Buenos Aires, Argentina. The race mostly run on the Autódromo Oscar Alfredo Gálvez, although it ran on the Costanera circuit in 1957. Besides a single race in Caracas, Venezuela, it was the only annual South American race in the history of the World Sportscar Championship.

== History ==
In 1953, Formula One visited the newly built Autódromo in the center of Buenos Aires for the Argentine Grand Prix. The race was successful enough for Formula One to return the following year, and it was also decided that the newly formed World Sportscar Championship would add the track to their schedule as a traditional season-opening event. Following the 1000km Nürburgring the previous year, this would make the Buenos Aires round only the second 1,000 km (621.4 mi) event in the series history.

A 9.5 km (5.9 mi) circuit using long sections of the Avenida General Paz highway attached to the Autodromo section used only by Formula One would be used for the first 1000 km event. In 1955, an even longer section of the Autopista General Pablo Riccheri route would be added, making the circuit 17.1 km (10.6 mi) in length before it returned to its original size once again in 1956. The event would move however in 1957, to the Costanera circuit before returning to the Autodromo in 1958. One final appearance was made by both Formula One and sports cars in 1960 before both chose not to return to Argentina for the time being.

The 1000 km event would return once more in 1970, as a non-championship exhibition round. The Autodromo had been expanded in 1968 to allow for a 6.1 km (3.8 mi) circuit and eliminating the use of public highways. World Championship status would return again in 1971 while Formula One would also test the re-addition of the Argentine Grand Prix by holding their own exhibition race. The circuit would be modified again in 1972, shortening the lap to 6.0 km (3.7 mi) for the sportscars, while the Argentine Grand Prix officially returned to the Formula One calendar where it would stay for nearly a decade. The 1000 km sports car event would however be abandoned after the 1972 running, with the series eliminating several fly-away events in the coming years to cut costs.

In 2017, Turismo Carretera revived the event as one of their Carreras Especiales ("special races") to celebrate the 80th anniversary of the category. This version of the race was held only twice, in 2017 and 2018, with one win apiece going to Ford and Chevrolet.

== Winners ==
The event was dominated by Ferraris, winning five out of the six runnings in the race's first incarnation before winning the final event once again in 1972. American Phil Hill would be the only driver to win more than once.

Year	Drivers	Team	Car	Time	Circuit
World Sportscar Championship event
1954	(Italy) Giuseppe Farina (Italy) Umberto Maglioli	(Italy) Scuderia Ferrari	Ferrari 375 MM	6:41:50.800	Gálvez – Callejero
1955	(Argentina) Enrique Saenz Valiente (Argentina) José María Ibáñez	No Team Name	Ferrari 375 Plus	6:35:15.400	Gálvez – Callejero
1956	(United Kingdom) Stirling Moss (Argentina) Carlos Menditeguy	(Italy) Officine Alfieri Maserati	Maserati 300S	6:29:37.900	Gálvez – Callejero
1957	(United States) Masten Gregory (Italy) Eugenio Castellotti (Italy) Luigi Musso	(United States) Scuderia Temple Buell	Ferrari 290 MM	6:10:29.900	Costanera
1958	(United Kingdom) Peter Collins (United States) Phil Hill	(Italy) Scuderia Ferrari	Ferrari 250 Testa Rossa	6:19:55.400	Gálvez – Callejero
1959	No Race				
1960	(United States) Phil Hill (United Kingdom) Cliff Allison	(Italy) Scuderia Ferrari	Ferrari 250 TR59/60	6:17:12.100	Gálvez – Callejero
1961 to 1969	No Races				
1970^{†}	(France) Jean-Pierre Beltoise (France) Henri Pescarolo	(France) Equipe Matra	Matra-Simca MS630/650	5:37:22.200	Gálvez
1971	(Switzerland) Jo Siffert (United Kingdom) Derek Bell	(United Kingdom) J.W. Automotive	Porsche 917K	5:25:25.940	Gálvez
1972	(Sweden) Ronnie Peterson (Australia) Tim Schenken	(Italy) SpA Ferrari SEFAC	Ferrari 312 PB	5:45:58.220	Gálvez
1973 to 2016	No Races				
Turismo Carretera event
2017	(Argentina) Juan Manuel Silva (Argentina) Juan Tomás Catalán Magni	(Argentina) CM Motorsport	Ford Falcon TC	5:30:55.166	Gálvez
2018	(Argentina) Agustín Canapino (Argentina) Federico Alonso (Argentina) Martín Ponte	(Argentina) Jet Racing	Chevrolet Coupé SS	5:35:10.931	Gálvez
2019 to 2025	No Races				

† - Non-championship event.
