= TC Pista =

- Category: Stock cars
- Country: Argentina
- Inaugural season: 1995
- Drivers' champion: (Argentina) Marco Dianda
- Makes' champion: Ford
- Teams' champion: Galarza Racing
- Official website: ACTC.org.ar

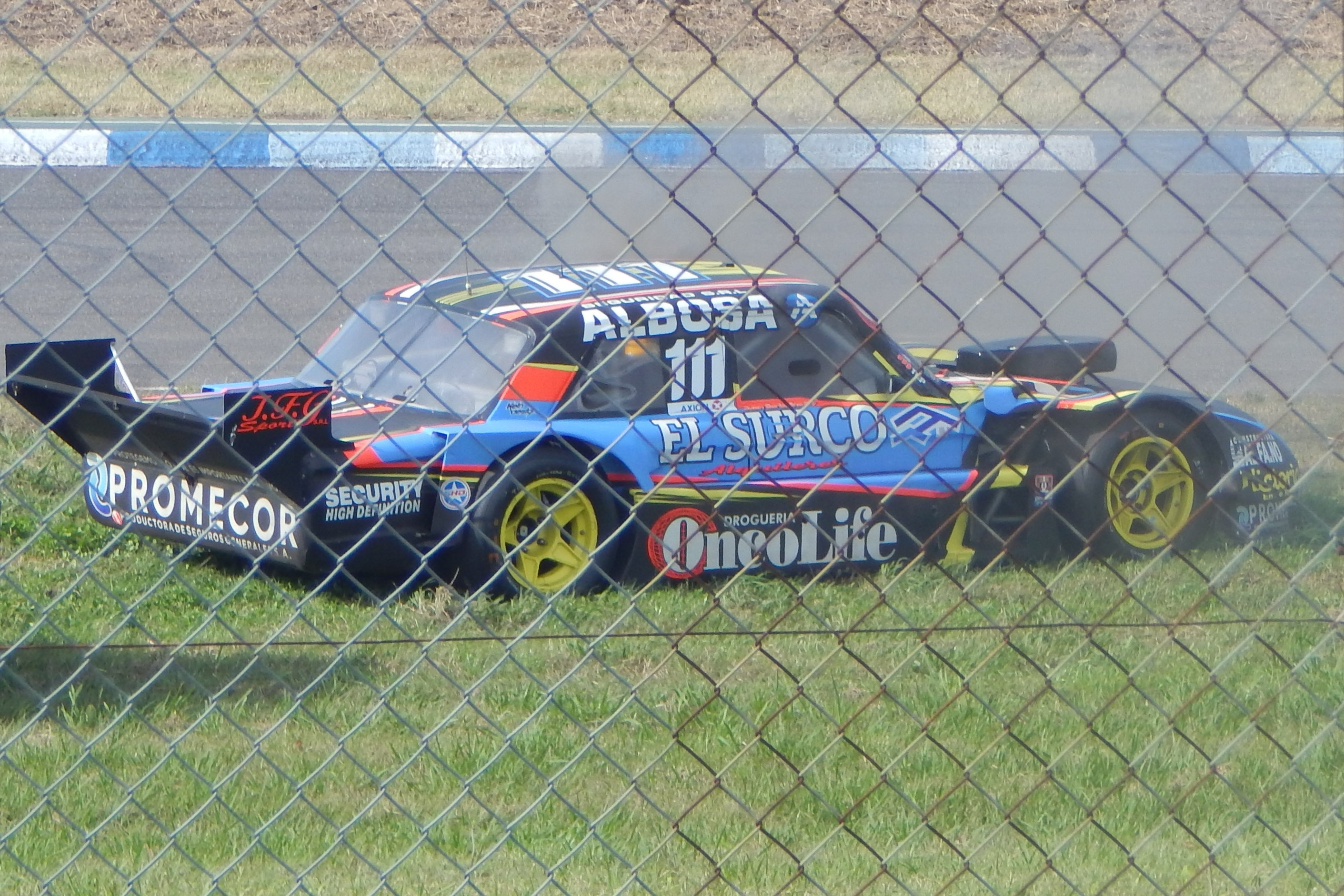
Juan Francisco Garbelino, TC Pista Rafaela 2019.

TC Pista is a stock car racing series in Argentina, created by the Asociación Corredores de Turismo Carretera in 1995. Its purpose was to prepare pilots from regional categories who wish to compete in Turismo Carretera. It also made it possible to absorb those pilots who did not fit on the TC grid when they went from using road circuits to permanent road courses. This division has the same regulations as the major division, but differs in the preparation of its cars, these being of lower power.

Until 2015, the four TC brands have distributed their titles as follows: Ford achieved the highest award 11 times, Chevrolet achieved 6 crowns, while Dodge obtained 5 crowns and Torino 3 crowns.

Currently, the championship is defined by means of a Play Off system implemented by ACTC, which puts into play the Río Uruguay Seguros Silver Cup and also grants a limited number of promotions to the higher category.

== Champions ==
Year	Driver	Model
1995	Rubén Muñiz	Ford Falcon
1996	Guillermo Tambucci	Dodge GTX
1997	José Luis Firmani	Dodge GTX
1998	Roberto Rivas	Chevrolet Coupé SS
1999	Fabrizio Benedetti	Ford Falcon
2000	Alejandro Ramón	Chevrolet Coupé SS
2001	Javier Bernardini	Ford Falcon
2002	José Savino	Ford Falcon
2003	Lionel Ugalde	Ford Falcon
2004	Maximiliano Juan	Ford Falcon
2005	Jonatan Castellano	Dodge Cherokee
2006	Juan Bautista De Benedictis	Ford Falcon
2007	Próspero Bonelli	Ford Falcon
2008	Agustín Canapino	Chevrolet Coupé SS
2009	Tomás Urretavizcaya	Chevrolet Coupé SS
2010	Mauro Giallombardo	Ford Falcon
2011	Leonel Sotro	Ford Falcon
2012	Luciano Ventricelli	Ford Falcon
2013	Nicolás Pezzucchi	Dodge Cherokee
2014	Camilo Echevarria	Chevrolet Coupé SS
2015	Esteban Gini	Torino Cherokee
2016	Nicolás Cotignola	Torino Cherokee
2017	Valentín Aguirre	Dodge Cherokee
2018	Juan Cruz Benvenuti	Torino Cherokee
2019	Diego Ciantini	Chevrolet Coupé SS
2020	Ayrton Londero	Ford Falcon
2021	Kevin Candela	Ford Falcon
2022	Otto Fritzler	Ford Falcon
2023	Tobías Martínez	Chevrolet Coupé SS
2024	Hernán Palazzo	Chevrolet Coupé SS
2025	Marco Dianda	Dodge Cherokee
