= Autódromo Ciudad de Rafaela =

Motor racing circuit in Argentina

- Location: Rafaela, Santa Fe, Argentina
- Coordinates: 31°12′27″S 61°28′35″W
- Capacity: approx. 2,200
- Owner: Atlético de Rafaela
- Broke ground: 1952
- Opened: 23 May 1953; 73 years ago
- Major events: Current: Turismo Carretera (1953–1955, 1966–1968, 1987, 1993–1997, 1999–2005, 2007–2019, 2021–2024, 2026); Former: TC2000 (1983–1997, 1999–2001, 2004–2005, 2012, 2014–2015, 2017–2018, 2022–2023); Top Race V6 (2000, 2006, 2022); Formula 3 Sudamericana (1988, 1997, 2005); USAC Rafaela Indy 300 (1971); 500 Millas Argentinas (until 1971)

Oval Circuit (1953–present)
- Surface: Asphalt (since 1966)
- Length: 4.624 km (2.873 mi)
- Turns: 4
- Race lap record: 1:08.098 ( (Argentina) Gabriel Ponce de León, Ford Focus, 2005, TC2000)

Oval Circuit with 2 Chicanes
- Surface: Asphalt
- Length: 4.662 km (2.897 mi)
- Turns: 8
- Race lap record: 1:15.185 ( (Argentina) Manuel Mallo, Chevrolet Cruze, 2017, TC2000)

TC Oval Circuit with 3 Chicanes
- Surface: Asphalt
- Length: 4.740 km (2.945 mi)
- Turns: 9
- Race lap record: 1:27.382 ( (Argentina) Juan Catalán Magni, Dodge Cherokee, 2018, TC)

No.2 Circuit - Ing. Juan R. Báscolo
- Surface: Asphalt
- Length: 3.050 km (1.895 mi)
- Turns: 9
- Race lap record: 0:55.094 ( (Brazil) Alberto Valerio, Dallara F301, 2005, F3)

The Autódromo Ciudad de Rafaela is a motor racing circuit in Rafaela, Santa Fe, Argentina built in 1952 and paved in 1966. With a length of 2.873 miles (4.624 km), the oval track is the longest oval track in the world still in use for racing.

== Events ==
The venue – owned by Atlético de Rafaela – hosted the 500 Millas Argentinas race until 1971. The USAC Rafaela Indy 300 race was held at the Autódromo in 1971, won by Al Unser in a Colt-Ford Turbo. It has hosted also TC2000 Championship, Turismo Carretera, Top Race V6, and the Formula Three Sudamericana:

Current

- June: Turismo Carretera, Turismo Carretera Pista, Fórmula 2 Argentina
- November: Turismo Pista, Turismo Carretera 2000

Former

- Formula 3 Sudamericana (1988, 1997, 2005)
- Fórmula Nacional Argentina (1983–1997, 1999–2001, 2004–2005, 2012, 2014–2015, 2017–2018, 2022–2023)
- TC2000 Championship (1983–1997, 1999–2001, 2004–2005, 2012, 2014–2015, 2017–2018, 2022–2023)
- Top Race V6 (2000, 2006, 2022)
- United States Auto Club
  - Rafaela Indy 300 (1971)

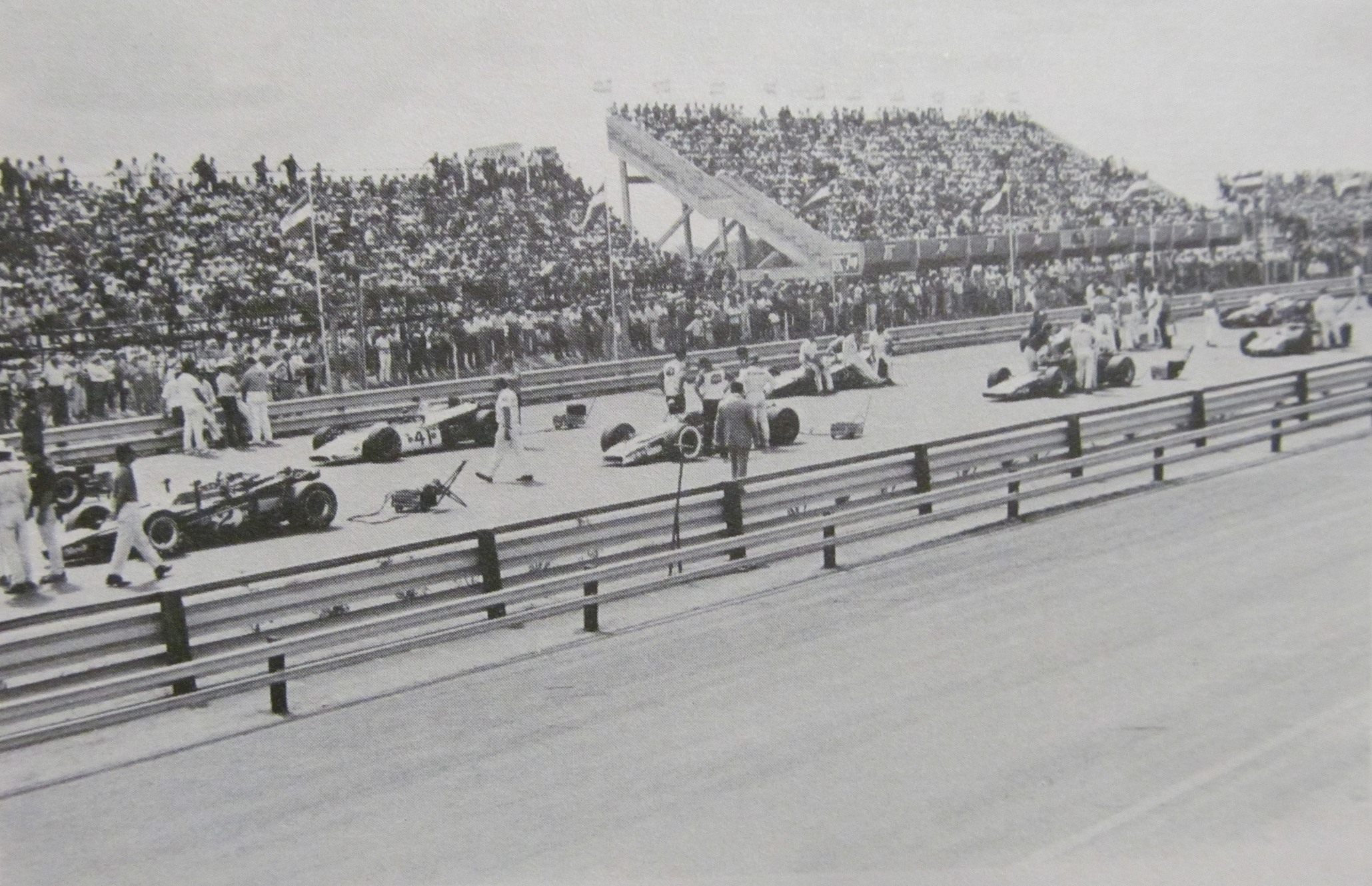
Grid before the start of the Rafaela Indy 300

== Lap records ==
The unofficial qualifying lap record on the oval circuit was set by Lloyd Ruby with a lap of 0:59.740 with Mongoose 70 in 1971 Rafaela Indy 300. As of July 2018, the fastest official race lap records at the Autódromo Ciudad de Rafaela are listed as:

Category	Time	Driver	Vehicle	Event
Oval Circuit (1953–present): 4.624 km (2.873 mi)
TC2000	1:08.098	Gabriel Ponce de León	Ford Focus	2005 Rafaela TC2000 round
Oval Circuit with 2 Chicanes: 4.662 km (2.897 mi)
Súper TC2000	1:15.185	Manuel Mallo	Chevrolet Cruze	2017 Rafaela Súper TC2000 round
TC Oval Circuit with 3 Chicanes: 4.740 km (2.945 mi)
Turismo Carretera	1:27.382	Juan Catalán Magni	Dodge GTX (Turismo Carretera)	2018 Rafaela Turismo Carretera round
No.2 Circuit - Ing. Juan R. Báscolo: 3.050 km (1.895 mi)
Formula Three	0:55.094	Alberto Valerio	Dallara F301	2005 Rafaela F3 Sudamericana round
Formula Renault 2.0	1:08.775	Emiliano Marino	Tito F4-A	2015 Rafaela Formula Renault Argentina round
TC2000 Series	1:09.501	Humberto Krujoski	Toyota Corolla X	2015 Rafaela TC2000 Series round
