= Jonatan Castellano =

Argentine racing driver (born 1985)

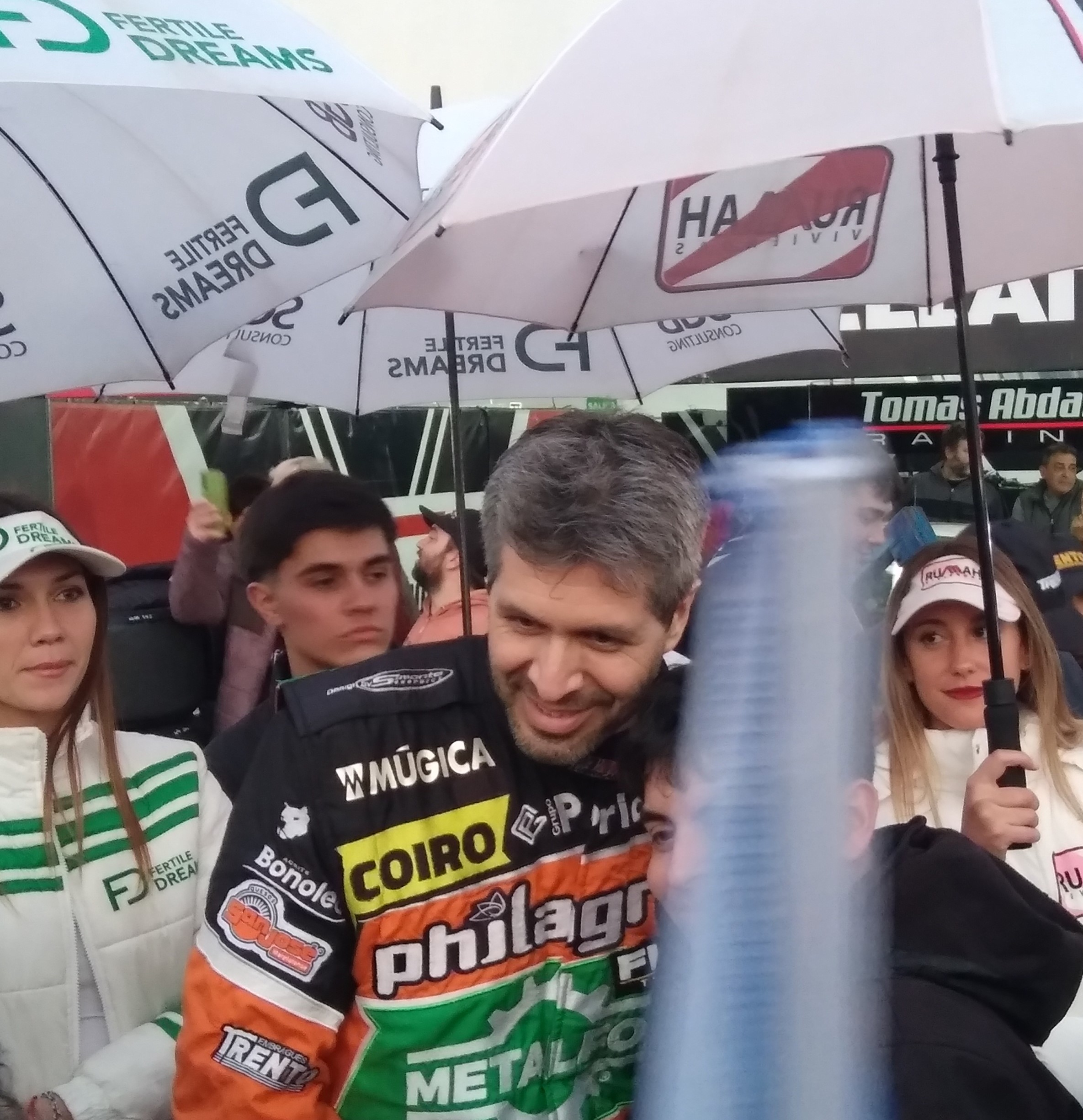
- Castellano (centre) in 2024
- Nationality: Argentine
- Born: 16 May 1985 (age 41) Lobería, Buenos Aires Province, Argentina

Turismo Carretera
- Years active: 2006–present
- Teams: Castellano Power Team
- Starts: 273
- Wins: 8 (Finals); 19 (Heats)
- Poles: 8
- Fastest laps: 5
- Best finish: 2nd in 2018

Previous series
- 2001–2003 2004–2005 2008, 2014–2018, 2020–2023 2018, 2020: Fórmula Renault Argentina; TC Pista; Turismo Nacional TC Pick Up

Championship titles
- 2005: TC Pista

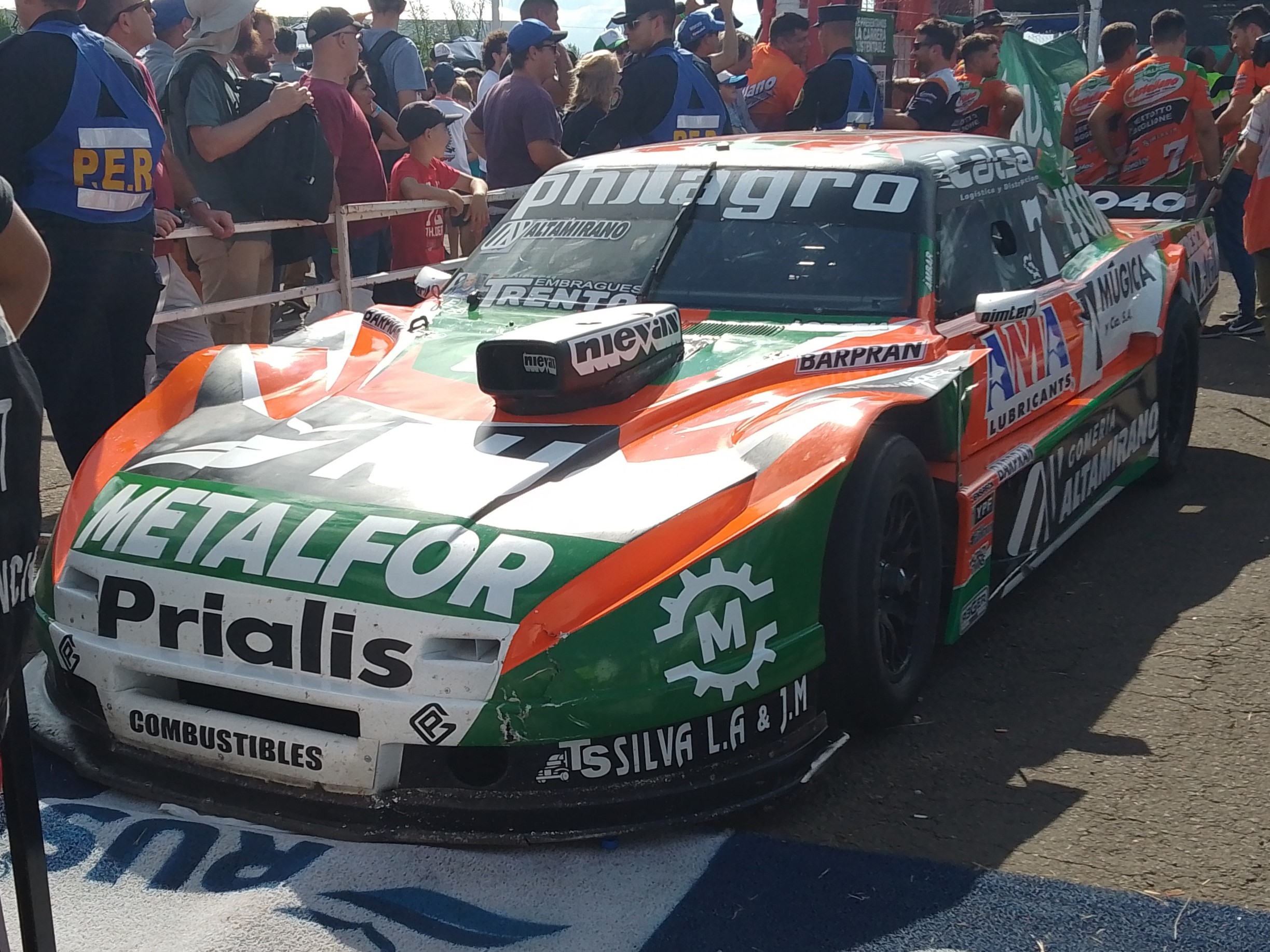
Jonatan Castellano's Dodge Cherokee, in 2023.

Jonatan Oscar Roberto Castellano (born May 16, 1985, in Lobería, Buenos Aires Province) is an Argentine racing driver. He has secured two national championships, the TC Pista championship in 2005 and the Turismo Nacional Clase 3 championship in 2022.

== Career ==
Castellano has been a Turismo Carretera driver since 2006, competing with the family team Castellano Power Team with a Dodge Cherokee. His first victory came in May 2010 in Rafaela. In 2018, he secured the runner-up position behind Agustín Canapino. He is also a regular driver in Turismo Nacional Clase 3, where he finished third in 2021 and became the champion in 2023 driving a Chevrolet Cruze.

Castellano is the son of the former Turismo Carretera champion, Oscar Castellano. Together they lead the Castellano Power Team.

== Career results ==
=== Summary ===
Season	Series	Position	Car	Team
2001	Fórmula Renault Argentina	13th	Crespi–Renault	?
2002	Fórmula Renault Argentina	21st	Crespi–Renault	?
2003	Fórmula Renault Argentina	14th	Crespi–Renault	?
2004	TC Pista	16th	Dodge Cherokee	Castellano Power Team
2005	TC Pista	1st	Dodge Cherokee	Castellano Power Team
2006	Turismo Carretera	31st	Dodge Cherokee	Castellano Power Team
2007	Turismo Carretera	20th	Dodge Cherokee	Castellano Power Team
2008	Turismo Carretera	14th	Dodge Cherokee	Castellano Power Team
2008	Turismo Nacional - Clase 3	35th	Ford Focus	?
2009	Turismo Carretera	9th	Dodge Cherokee	Castellano Power Team
2009	Top Race V6	NC	Volkswagen Passat TRV6	?
2010	Turismo Carretera	10th	Dodge Cherokee	Castellano Power Team
2011	Turismo Carretera	6th	Dodge Cherokee	Castellano Power Team
2011	TC Mouras - Guest Driver Championship	?	Dodge Cherokee	?
2012	Turismo Carretera	10th	Dodge Cherokee	Castellano Power Team
2012	TC Mouras - Guest Driver Championship	?	Dodge Cherokee	?
2013	Turismo Carretera	8th	Dodge Cherokee	Metalfor Castellano Power Team
2013	TC Mouras - Guest Driver Championship	?	Dodge Cherokee	?
2014	Turismo Carretera	5th	Dodge Cherokee	Metalfor Castellano Power Team
2014	Turismo Nacional - Clase 3	11th	Chevrolet Vectra	JCB Motor Sport
2015	Turismo Carretera	25th	Dodge Cherokee	Metalfor Castellano Power Team
2015	Turismo Nacional - Clase 3	11th	Chevrolet Cruze	Castellano Power Team
2016	Turismo Carretera	11th	Dodge Cherokee	Metalfor Castellano Power Team
2016	Turismo Nacional - Clase 3	5th	Chevrolet Cruze	Castellano Power Team
2017	Turismo Carretera	9th	Dodge Cherokee	Metalfor Castellano Power Team
2017	Turismo Nacional - Clase 3	4th	Chevrolet Cruze	Castellano Power Team
2017	Súper TC2000	NC	Chevrolet Cruze	YPF Chevrolet
2018	Turismo Carretera	2nd	Dodge Cherokee	Metalfor Castellano Power Team
2018	Turismo Nacional - Clase 3	12th	Toyota Corolla	Tito Bessone Toyota Team
2018	TC Pick Up	8th	Toyota Hilux	Las Toscas Racing
2019	Turismo Carretera	11th	Dodge Cherokee	Metalfor Castellano Power Team
2020	Turismo Carretera	8th	Dodge Cherokee	Castellano Power Team
2020	Turismo Nacional - Clase 3	16th	Ford Focus	GC Competición
2020	TC Pick Up	7th	Fiat Toro	Octanos Competición
2021	Turismo Carretera	10th	Dodge Cherokee	Castellano Power Team
2021	Turismo Nacional - Clase 3	3rd	Chevrolet Cruze	MG-C Pergamino
2022	Turismo Carretera	7th	Dodge Cherokee	Castellano Power Team
2022	Turismo Nacional - Clase 3	1st	Chevrolet Cruze	MG-C Pergamino
2023	Turismo Carretera	4th	Dodge Cherokee	Castellano Power Team
2023	Turismo Nacional - Clase 3	9th	Chevrolet Cruze	MG-C Pergamino
2024	Turismo Carretera		Dodge Cherokee; Dodge Challenger	Tomas Abdala Racing
2024	Turismo Nacional - Clase 3		Chevrolet Cruze	MG-C Pergamino
