= Dodge GTX =

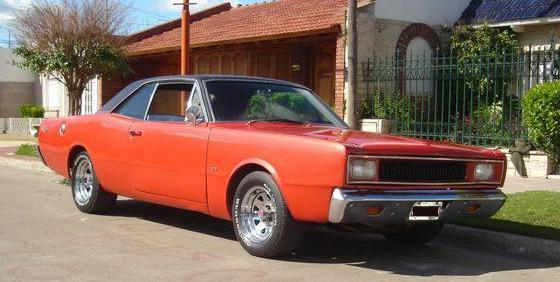

Overview
- Manufacturer: Chrysler-Fevre Argentina S.A. (Dodge)
- Model years: 1970–1979
- Assembly: San Justo, Buenos Aires, Argentina

Body and chassis
- Class: Muscle car
- Body style: 2-door coupe
- Platform: A-body
- Related: Dodge Polara

Powertrain
- Engine: 318 cu in (5.2 L) LA V8; 225 cu in (3.7 L) Slant-6
- Transmission: 4-speed manual

Dimensions
- Wheelbase: 2,910 mm (115 in)
- Length: 5,024 mm (198 in)
- Width: 1,904 mm (75 in)
- Height: 1,375 mm (54 in)
- Curb weight: 1,530–1,590 kg (3,373–3,505 lb)

The Dodge GTX is a muscle car manufactured by Chrysler-Fevre Argentina S.A. under the Dodge brand. One of few muscle cars made in Argentina, the hardtop performance coupé was based on the 1960/66 platform A (Early A-Body).

The GTX was first presented in October 1970 as a replacement for the Dodge GT sedan model. The Dodge Polara and its evolved R/T version were later evolutions of this package.

It was originally featured equipped with an inline 6-cylinder Slant-Power A-119 engine, which was originally used in the Dodge GT sedan, mated to a 4-speed manual gearbox. Later this engine would be supplanted by a 318 cubic inch V8, which would end up becoming distinctive for this model, until the end of its production in 1979.

A version of this car has competed in the Turismo Carretera motorsport championship since the 1970s, winning eight out of ten titles in the 1980s fitted with its "Slant Six" engine. In the 1990s, the GTX and its IKA-Renault counterpart were fitted with AMC Cherokee engines to remain competitive against the Ford and Chevrolet models.

== History ==
=== Precedent ===
In 1968, Chrysler-Fevre Argentina S.A. had launched a new line of sedans, all of them based on the same exclusive body design for the Argentine market, which was a development based on the third generation North American Dart (63/66) or the Valiant already sold in Argentina previously. In the first place and for a short period of time the Dodge Valiant would be launched, it was a basic sedan with little equipment, in some cases they even lacked radio, they also sported 13" steel wheels with hubcap, soon after it was discontinued to fill the range with three well distinguished models, first the Taxi version, then the Polara with a little more equipment and an improved interior to end the Dodge line with a more luxurious model named "Coronado", from this last model the Dodge came off the GT, a luxury sedan developed with sporty performance, this model was equipped with a 3687cm3 (225 cubic inch) Chrysler Slant-Power A-119 engine, with a compression ratio of 8.4: 1 (the highest in the range) and capable of delivering 155HP (SAE) at 4500rpm. All this, coupled to a 4-speed manual A-833 of American origin.

Although the reception of this vehicle was good by the public (mainly thanks to its high performance and the combination of its attributes as a luxury car), Chrysler-Fevre would seek a way to offer a new product with a more sporty image, taking into account that the models of the sedan line (Polara and Coronado), began to be seen more as luxurious cars than sports cars. For this reason, Chrysler-Fevre would carry out a marketing study that finally found that a purely sports car image captured the attention of its customers.
