= Juan Pablo Gianini =

Argentine racing driver (born 1978)

- Born: 23 October 1978 (age 47) Salto, Buenos Aires, Argentina

Championship titles
- 2019-2021: TC Pick Up

Juan Pablo Gianini (born 23 October 1978) is an Argentine racing driver and former motorcycle racer. He currently competes in Turismo Carretera and TC Pick Up. He was a three-time TC Pick Up champion between 2019 and 2021.

== Career ==
After starting to compete in minibikes in 1992, Gianini participated in the Argentine motorcycle championships, until he acquired a certain national notoriety, so much so that he received a wild card for participation in the 1998 edition of the Argentine motorcycle Grand Prix, in the 500cc class with the Hardwick Racing Shell Advance Racing team Honda NSR500V. After qualifying in 24th place, he finished 21st and last in the race.

After his activity in the field of motorcycling, in 2000, Gianini began to devote himself to racing on four wheels in stock car racing. Since 2003, he has competed in the Turismo Carretera. He debuted in TC Pick Up in 2019, in the second season of the championship. He won that championship and subsequent ones with Ford Ranger.
