= Dodge GTX (Turismo Carretera) =

Argentinian race car

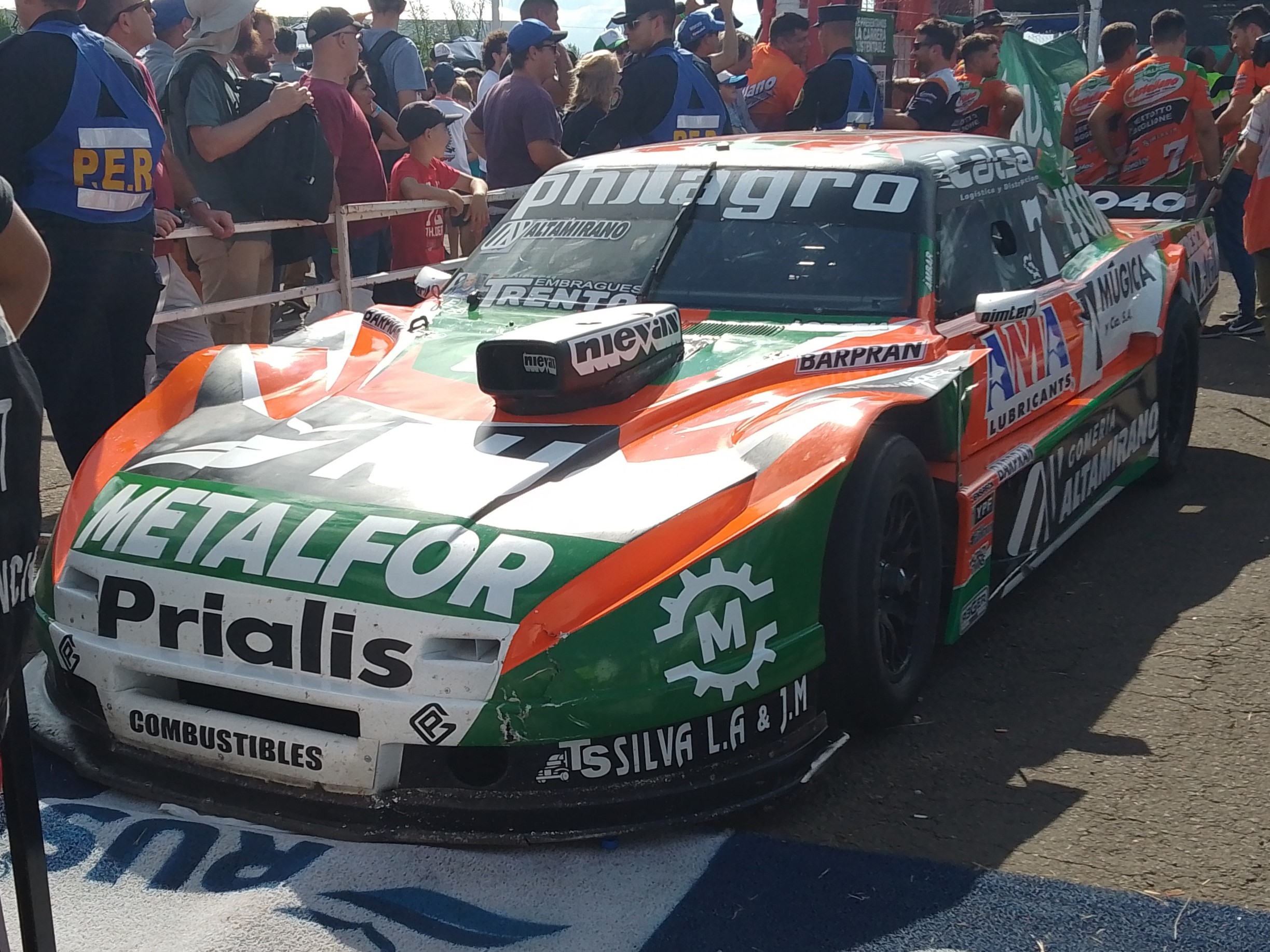
- Jonatan Castellano at the 2023 Turismo Carretera Concepción del Uruguay round
- Category: ACTC stock car
- Constructor: Chrysler-Fevre Argentina S.A. (Dodge)

Technical specifications
- Suspension (front): Double wishbones, pushrod actuated coil springs over shock absorbers, anti-roll bar (Deformable parallelogram)
- Suspension (rear): Double wishbones, pushrod actuated coil springs love shock absorbers, anti-roll bar (formerly rigid axle)
- Axle track: 1,410–1,600 mm (55.5–63.0 in) (front); 2,010 mm (79.1 in) (rear)
- Wheelbase: 2,789–2,849 mm (109.8–112.2 in)
- Engine: AMC XJ 3.0–4.0 L (183.1–244.1 cu in) OHV I6 naturally-aspirated FR
- Transmission: 5-speed manual
- Power: 330–500 hp (246–373 kW)
- Weight: 1,330 kg (2,932 lb)

Competition history

The Dodge GTX (also referred to as Dodge Cherokee or Dodge GTX Cherokee) is a stock car version of the Dodge GTX, designed to race in Asociación Corredores de Turismo Carretera-sanctioned series including Turismo Carretera.

== History ==
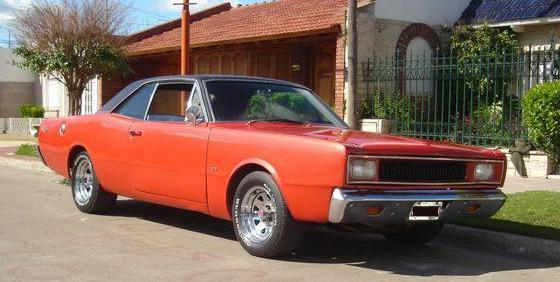
Dodge GTX, the model used as the basis for the prototype Dodge Cherokee.

Dodge's competition history in Turismo Carretera dates back to the start of the category in the 1930s, with the 6C Coupé and sister brands Plymouth and DeSoto used. A 6C Coupé in the hands of Raúl Melo Fajardo won the second-ever event of the category, the "Corrientes - Goya - Corrientes", in 1937. As the series grew into the 1950s, 60s and 70s, these models were usurped by various Valiants, Dodge 1500s and the Dodge Polara as Improved Production vehicles battled 'prototype' evolutions.

The GTX ultimately replaced the Polara in the Turismo Carretera field in the 1970s, with its more streamlined coupé design and "Slant-Six" engine favoured by competitors. To be eligible to compete in the category, the Slant-Six had to be de-tuned from its factory 225in^{3} capacity and meet an 8:1 compression rate – however its more aerodynamic shape proved advantageous compared to its rivals. The GTX hit its stride in the 1980s, winning eight out of the decade's ten titles in the hands of Roberto Mouras, Oscar Castellano and Oscar Angeletti. In 1989, to counter the GTXs' dominance, the ACTC approved an increased compression rate of 9:1 for the Ford and Chevrolet models, which had an immediate impact with Fords and Chevrolets winning the next six championships – and whilst Juan Manuel Landa finished runner-up in a GTX in 1992, the damage was done as competitors began to move away from the Dodge product.

In 1995, a process of sporting and technical homogenisation was undertaken in an attempt to bring all brands to a level playing field. To achieve this, the GTX and its IKA-Renault counterpart were fitted with Jeep Cherokee engines. Former Formula One driver Miguel Ángel Guerra claimed the first victory for a Cherokee-powered GTX in 1997, albeit under some controversy as weight disparities still persisted between the brands. Ernesto Bessone II claimed what was deemed the first 'genuine' GTX Cherokee victory in 1998, and went on to finish third in the 2000 championship. Bessone ultimately claimed the brands' first title in fifteen years in 2003, with another ex-F1 driver in Norberto Fontana claiming a second title in 2006 following the disqualification of rival Diego Aventín. The brand again entered a period of drought in the 2010s, with the brands' best showing being Jonatan Castellano (son of Oscar) finishing runner-up to Agustín Canapino in 2018.
