= Torino Cherokee =

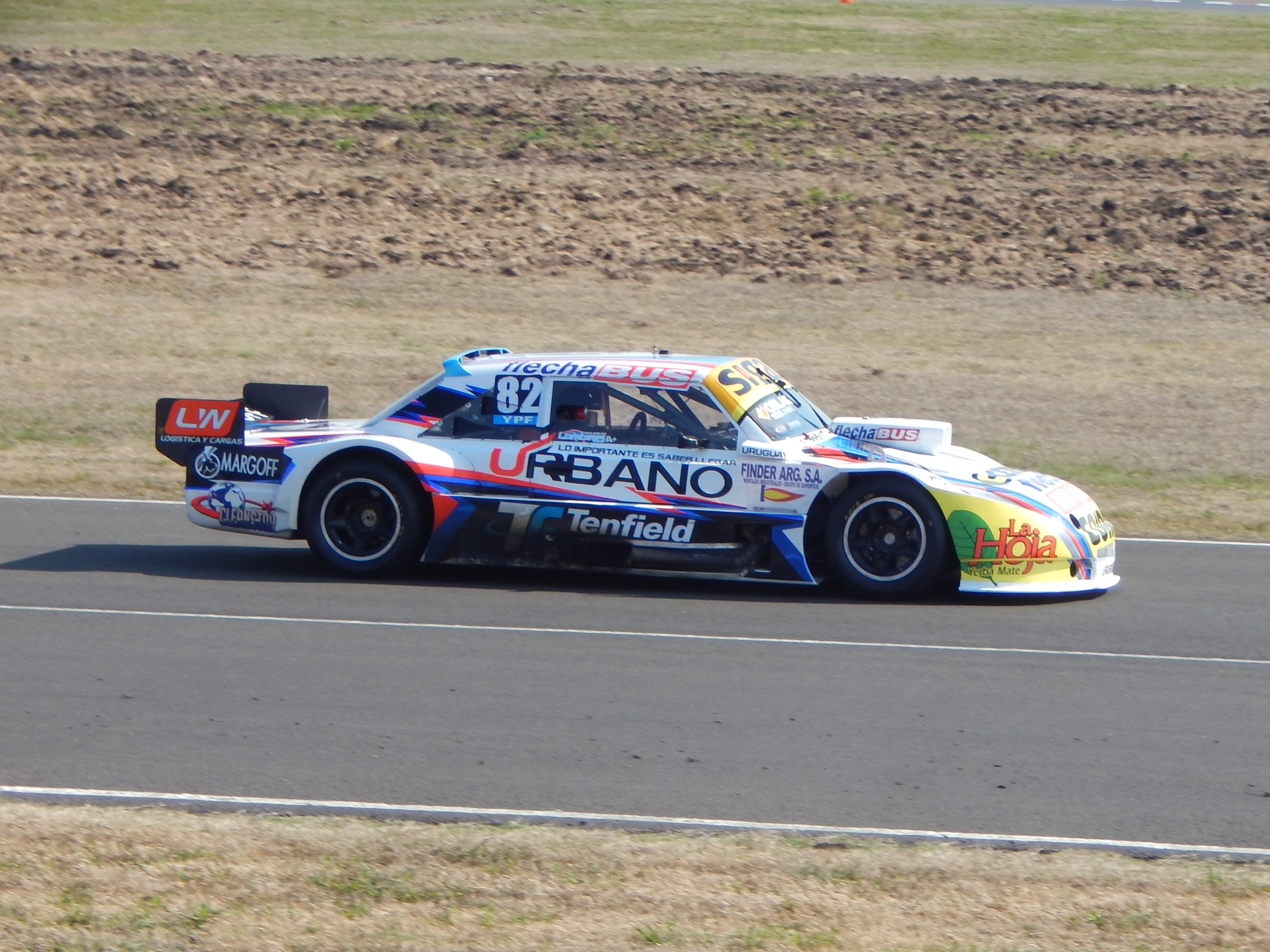
- Torino Cherokee of Mauricio Lambiris in 2015
- Category: ACTC stock car
- Constructor: Industrias Kaiser Argentina
- Successor: Torino TC 2024

Technical specifications
- Suspension (front): Double wishbones, pushrod actuated coil springs over shock absorbers, anti-roll bar (Deformable parallelogram)
- Suspension (rear): Double wishbones, pushrod actuated coil springs love shock absorbers, anti-roll bar (formerly rigid axle)
- Axle track: 1,445–1,614 mm (56.9–63.5 in) (front); 2,010 mm (79.1 in) (rear)
- Wheelbase: 2,723–2,810 mm (107.2–110.6 in)
- Engine: AMC XJ 3.0–4.0 L (183.1–244.1 cu in) OHV I6 naturally-aspirated FR
- Transmission: 5-speed manual
- Power: 340–500 hp (254–373 kW)
- Weight: 1,330 kg (2,932 lb)

Competition history

The Torino Cherokee is a racing car manufactured and developed in Argentina for its participation in the Turismo Carretera. It is a sports development carried out under the regulations of the Asociación Corredores de Turismo Carretera, using the IKA Torino production model, manufactured in Argentina between the 1960s and 1980s, as its basis.

This prototype was developed and presented in the mid-1990s, under production standards imposed by ACTC, in order to grant users of the IKA brand (vulgar and directly identified by the name of the Torino model), a new tool to compete under equal conditions in the category, taking into account the sporting situation they lived after, after their debut at the end of the 1960s (in which they would exercise a very notorious dominance between 1966 and 1971), various technical restrictions were imposed that would lead to a drop in performance and their almost subsequent disappearance from the considerations of the riders in the category.

The development of this prototype consisted in the replacement of the original IKA Torino powertrain, being implemented in its place an impeller developed by the American Motors Corporation and produced first by it and later by Chrysler, to equip its Jeep Cherokee product (hence, the name is borrowed to baptize the prototype), which in turn receives a modification in its original nominal measurements to comply with the regulatory fee imposed by the ACTC, all this, added to continuous aerodynamic reforms developed by the entity rector of the category, according to the technical regulations presented in the different seasons.

Thanks to this driver, the prototype would not only be able to return the IKA Torino model to the top of the category, but would also obtain approval from ACTC for participation in its lower divisions, where it would also reap great results while exhibiting great performance.

The presentation of this prototype came in conjunction with the previous development of the impeller for use in the Dodge GTX model, on which the performance of the AMC XJ impeller was tested for subsequent homologation. However, contrary to expectations, the engine was first released and homologated in the Torino model, the driver Luis Rubén Di Palma being the first to release it in 1995.

== History ==
IKA-Renault Torino, the model used as the basis for the prototype Torino Cherokee.

Unlike the other brands that currently participate in the Argentine Turismo Carretera category, the history of Torino as a "brand" began from the moment of its presentation in the 1966 championship, when Industrias Kaiser Argentina decided to present itself to compete with an official team, taking on the challenge of putting on track a new model offered in the Argentine automotive market: The IKA Torino. It was thus that with three units of the aforementioned model, IKA made its presentation in the Turismo Carretera at the end of the 1960s, causing surprises and controversies among the other competitors. At that time, between the late '60s and the early' 70s, the Torino won 5 titles between 1967 and 1971, being the target of questioning due, among other things, to its revolutionary 230 cubic inch Tornado engine (3800 cc), which presented advanced technical solutions for its time, such as the location of the camshaft in the cylinder head and the development of its combustion chambers in a hemispherical shape.

=== The Tornado engine ===
Part of the formula for Torino's success in its official presentation at the TC had its driving force as its main credit. Although in 1966 the Torino had presented a wide range of models that differed in their equipment and mechanical performance, its more sporty version was the Torino 380W, a self-supporting coupe without studs, equipped with a 4-speed gearbox and a powerful 6-cylinder in-line Tornado engine, capable of delivering 132 HP of power at 4200 RPM, which made it a true top car.

The origins of the history of this engine date back to the 1950s, in the United States, where the chief engineer of the Willys Overland, Alessandro Sampietro, of Italian origin, began the development of a drive unit that meets innovative conditions with respect to the competition. Back then, it was very common to see naturally aspirated engines whose intake and exhaust valves had to be actuated by rods located on the side of the cylinder assembly. These engines were technically known as OHV engines. In this sense, Sampietro studied the possibility of allowing the opening of these valves by eliminating the use of such rods, for which he decided to bring the camshaft to the head of the cylinders. To all this, Sampietro also studied the possibility of a new physiognomy for the combustion chambers of the cylinders of his new engine, which is why he ended up developing new hemispherical chambers, which allowed the engine to have a higher performance, resulting of all this a robust, durable engine and above all things, fast. In this way, the development of an engine that received the technical name of SOHC engine was achieved. The development of the Tornado was based on an old Continental 226 engine, to which Sampietro applied his theory of the camshaft to the cylinder heads and spheroidal combustion chambers, which ended up reducing its maintenance by 50%, increasing its useful life.

=== A lethal blow ===
After having exercised a strong dominance in its first years of life, taking the titles of 1967, 1969, 1970 and 1971, this last season twice, the complaints of users of other brands against the brand would begin to emerge in the environment. Possessing the aforementioned 3800 cc Tornado engine, with overhead camshaft and hemispherical combustion chambers, the model presented many technical solutions that were considered advanced for the time, to the detriment of its rivals that had "rod" engines. It was thus that for the year 1972 and in a decision that would bring controversy, the Argentine Sports Automobile Commission (CADAD), an entity created by the Argentine Automobile Club to govern the organization of TC competitions, would establish for that season a maximum limit of 3000 cc of displacement, for all the vehicles participating in the division, a decision that clearly had a single favored one, being in this case the users of the Ford brand, a brand that already had an impeller with 3000 cc from the factory. To all this and to aggravate the situation, a ceiling of 2700 cc was imposed for Tornado engines, in view of the mentioned solutions, which were considered as "technical advantages" over their rivals. This measure would mean the beginning of a long pilgrimage for the Torino brand, which after having obtained the 1971 titles, with Eduardo Copello in Formula A and Luis Ruben Di Palma in Formula B, would not step on the highest step of the podium again, starting to be severely relegated, to the point of bordering on their direct disappearance from the category.

=== The first attempt at revival ===
Over the years, the extinction of the Torino in the Turismo Carretera began to be a serious event. Many references of the brand began to emigrate, leaving it almost without representatives interested in being able to develop, a car that had technically vetoed its strongest point. To all this, the appearance on the scene of the Dodge brand with its marvelous Dodge GTX coupe, aggravated things since it was accommodated as a third option between the traditional Chevrolet and Ford, reaching a great dominance in most of the decade of the '80.

The situation in Torino became increasingly unsustainable, until in 1995 Luis Rubén Di Palma, a historic driver who knew how to be a protagonist with the brand in the TC, began to face a personal project in order to be able to supply Torino of a driving unit that brings it back to the fore in the category. The project had the support of a rectification house (Rectificadora Luján) and the purpose of the project was to create a new cylinder head, taking advantage of the original Tornado engine block. To do this, Di Palma resorted to a previously unheard of idea: The union of two tapas to form one. The basis of this project had its sustenance in the unification of two original engine covers of the Renault J6R-793 impeller that equipped the Renault 18 model, to which a cylinder was cut and unified, forming a single 6-cylinder cover, which at the same time it met the maximum cylinder capacity of 3000 cc. That ACTC maintained after taking control of Turismo Carretera, after the disappearance of CADAD. The project was complemented with the formulation of a new power system, with a new intake manifold derived from the Renault engine and keeping many of the Tornado's mechanical characteristics original. The project was on track, in fact he had started the season racing with that engine. However, the low results obtained began to question the continuity of the project. Beyond this, finally the one who would take advantage of the existence of this project would be the pilot Mario Gómez, who, with the support of the Rectificadora Luján itself, competed between 1995 and 1997 with the engine that Luis Di Palma modified with the Renault 18.

=== Regulatory Revolution ===
After the poor results obtained in early 1995, Di Palma observed the development that ACTC had been undergoing on the AMC XJ impeller from the Jeep Cherokee production model, for its subsequent homologation and use on Dodge GTX units. The follow-up of these works led Di Palma to ask the TC regulator for the possibility of implementing this engine on his IKA Torino, obtaining the entity's approval for its use and implementation. In this way, the new prototype equipped with the so-called "Cherokee engine" made its presentation on the sixth date of the championship run on 28 May 1995. However, despite this presentation, Di Palma ended up choosing to change the brand, going on to close the year on a Chevrolet Chevy Malibu.

Despite this failed first attempt, the ACTC ended up approving the use of the Cherokee engine, both for the Dodge and Torino models, which also caused the change of the name for these models, happening in the case of the Torino to be known as Torino Cherokee. After the 1995 season, the pilot Mario Gómez became an unconditional representative of the Torino brand, later joining the pilot Eduardo Nicieza, at the head of the Supertap Chivilcoy team.

After the adaptation of the Cherokee engine, in which its nominal displacement was modified to meet the requirements of ACTC, new competitors began to be interested in the development of this power plant that would allow them to compete and put the brand back on track. In the presence of Mario Gómez and Eduardo Nicieza, new pilots would soon join, standing out again among them, the interest of Luis Rubén Di Palma to return to compete for the year 2000 with a new Torino Cherokee, however the tragedy would interpose in his road and a fatal plane crash would truncate his wishes. Despite this, his son Patricio would take charge of the completion of the project, finally being able to put it on track, to try to return the brand to the fore.

=== The first results ===
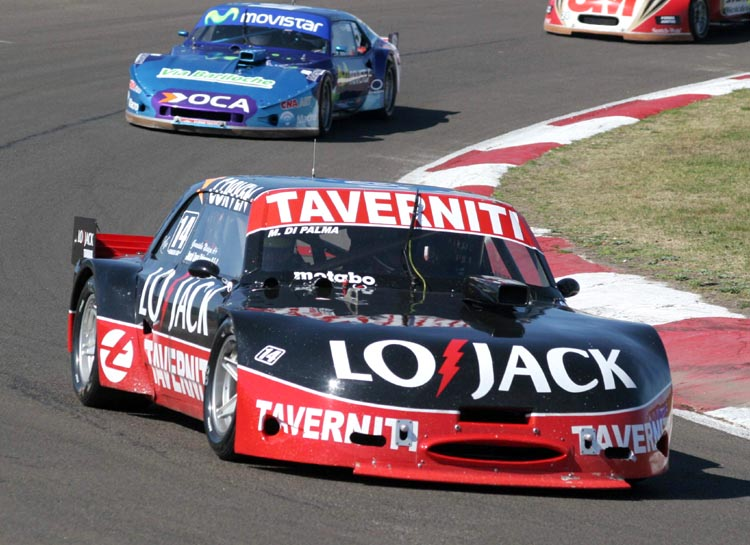
Torino Cherokee of Marcos di Palma in 2006.

After almost 30 years of drought, since the last victory obtained by a Torino in 1975 at the hands of Luis Rubén Di Palma, on 11 May 2003 a Torino would return to the highest step of the podium, coincidentally at the hands of the son of its last winner: Patricio Di Palma. The appointment was at the Autódromo Oscar Alfredo Gálvez in the Buenos Aires, where the third son of old Luis would fight to the last consequences.

The evolution of Torino in the TC would be such that it would soon begin to be homologated to also be able to participate in the lower divisions of ACTC, where it would also exhibit good competitive potential, with important results to its credit.

=== The first titles ===
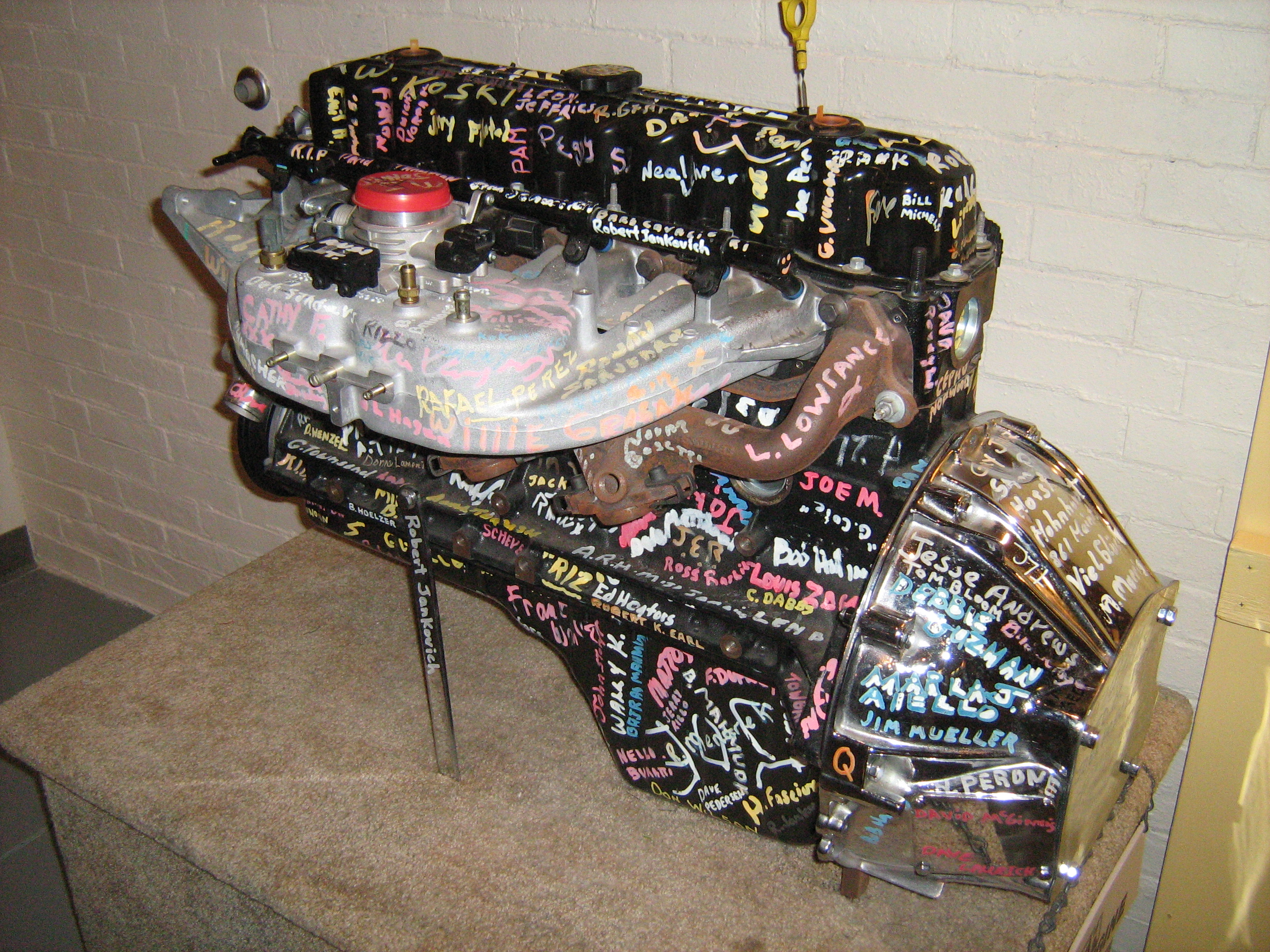
Side view of an AMC XJ 4.0 "Cherokee" engine (Pictured, 5 millionth unit, last engine produced by Jeep on 15 June 2001).

After the triumph of Di Palma in 2003, new pilots began to express their interest in competing with the Torino Cherokee, trying to add more representatives of the brand in the higher category. At the same time, the development of the prototype would continue over the years, receiving technical reforms according to each regulation imposed in each season that began. Beyond all, the model would begin to evolve steadily until it reached its first major distinction since the 1971 championships in 2006, when Patricio Di Palma obtained the runner-up of that same year, coincidentally behind a prototype that It carried the same drive unit, as was Norberto Fontana's Dodge Cherokee.

In the following years, new victories would continue until the appearance in 2009 of José María López at the command of a Torino Cherokee. With Oscar Castellano in the motorization and a team led by Alberto Scarazzini and Javier Ciabbatari in the care of the chassis, this Cordovan driver would give a devastating show of competitiveness, winning 2 races in the year and seriously running for the title. However, things would end up spoiling on the last date, where after a mistake at the Salotto curve of the Autódromo Juan y Oscar Gálvez, he would lose all his chances, having to settle for third place in the championship.

However, despite the brand's drought in the senior class, Torino would have its revenge a few years later in the minor division of the ACTC, when in 2013 the driver Gabriel Novillo would win the first title of the brand in the divisional TC Pista Mouras, returning to the brand a title since it was harvested in 1971. To achieve this end, Novillo would exhibit a devastating potential, reaping 6 victories per year, 4 of them consecutively.
