= Gol =

Gol or GOL may refer to:

== Places ==
- Gol, Bhopal, a village in Madhya Pradesh, India
- Gol, Gilan, a village in Gilan Province, Iran
- Gol, South Khorasan, a village in South Khorasan Province, Iran
- Gol, Bukan, a village in West Azerbaijan Province, Iran
- Gol, Chaldoran, a village in West Azerbaijan Province, Iran
- Gol, Naqadeh, a village in West Azerbaijan Province, Iran
- Gol, Norway, a municipality in Buskerud
- Göl, Vezirköprü, a municipality in Samsun Province, Turkey
- Gol is the Mongolian word for "river", and part of many river names, e.g. Khalkhin Gol, Edsin Gol, Tamir gol...

== People with the surname ==
- Janusz Gol (born 1985), Polish footballer
- Jean Gol (1942-1995), Belgian politician

== Television channels ==
- GOL PLAY, a Spanish TV channel dedicated to football (soccer)
- GOL TV, a defunct American sports television network dedicated to soccer

== Other uses ==
- Gol Linhas Aéreas, a Brazilian airline company
- GOL Sniper Magnum, a German sniper rifle
- Gol D. Roger, a character in the One Piece manga and anime series
- Conway's Game of Life, also known as CGoL
- Gods of Luxury, also known as G.O.L., a Swedish 1995 expressionistic electronica music project
- N'gol, a form of land diving in Vanuatu
- Volkswagen Gol, a car made by Volkswagen do Brasil
- "Gol!!!", a song by 357 from the 2001 album Pesme sa severa
- GOL, IATA code for Gold Beach Municipal Airport, Gold Beach, Oregon
- GOL, National Rail station code for Golspie railway station, Scotland
- Gol Acheron, a character in the Jak and Daxter video-game series
- Gol or Gul (design), an octagonal motif in oriental carpets and kilims

== See also ==
- Gol Gol (disambiguation)
- Goal (disambiguation)
- Gola (disambiguation)
- Gole (disambiguation)
