= Target =

Target most commonly refers to:

- Goal, a vision of the future or desired result that a person or group of people plan to achieve
- Shooting target, used in marksmanship training and various shooting sports
- Target Corporation, an American retail chain founded by John Geisse

Target may also refer to:

== Warfare and shooting ==
- Shooting target, used in marksmanship training and various shooting sports
  - Bullseye (target), the goal one for which one aims in many of these sports
  - Aiming point, in field artillery, fixed at a specific target
- Targeting (warfare), lists various military targets
- Color chart (or reference card), the reference target used in digital imaging for accurate color reproduction

== Places ==
- Target, Allier, France
- Target Lake, a lake in Minnesota

== Terms ==
- Target market, marketing strategy
  - Target audience, intended audience or readership of a publication, advertisement, or type of message
- In mathematics, the target of a function is also called the codomain; more generally, a morphism has a target
- Target (cricket), the total number of runs a team needs to win

== People ==
- Target (rapper), stage name of Croatian hip-hop artist Nenad Šimun
- DJ Target, stage name of English grime DJ Darren Joseph, member of Roll Deep
- Gui-Jean-Baptiste Target (1733–1807), French lawyer

== Art and media ==
- The Target, a comic book character, one of the trio Targeteers

=== Film ===
- Target (1952 film), a Western starring Tim Holt
- Target (1979 film), a crime film starring Luc Merenda
- Target (1985 film), a thriller starring Gene Hackman
- Target (1995 film), a drama directed by Sandip Ray
- Target (2004 film), an action film starring Stephen Baldwin
- Target (2010 film), a Bengali-language Indian film
- Target (2011 film), a Russian drama directed by Alexander Zeldovich
- Target (2014 film), an action suspense crime film directed by Yang Jiang
- The Target (film), a 2014 action film starring Ryu Seung-ryong
- Target or Don't Buy the Seller, a 2023 action film starring Shin Hye-sun

=== Games and sport ===
- Target (video game), a c. 1977 microcomputer game
- Target (word puzzle)
- Target Center, an indoor sports arena
- Target Field, a baseball park

=== Music ===
- Target (American band), American band from the 1970s
- Target (South Korean band), South Korean band debuting 2018
- Target (album), an album by Gerald Walker
- The Target (EP), a 2002 EP by Hoobastank
- "Target" (Embrace song), 2006
- "Target" (T-ara song), 2013
- "Target", a song by Shenseea from Alpha, 2022

=== Publications ===
- Target (journal), an academic journal of translation studies
- Target (magazine), an Indian children's magazine
- Target: 2006, a Transformers comic book story arc
- The Target (novel), a 2014 novel by David Baldacci
- Target, the magazine of the British Productivity Council
- Target, an Lao news magazine

=== Television ===
==== Series ====
- Target (American TV series), a short-lived American 1958 syndicated anthology television series
- Target (Australian TV series), Australian magazine style television show (1974-76)
- Target (New Zealand TV series), a consumer affairs program
- Target (British TV series), a 1970s British police drama

==== Episodes ====
- "The Target" (Dollhouse)
- "The Target" (The Office)
- "The Target" (The Wire)

== Brands, enterprises, and organizations ==
- Aeros Target, hang glider
- Target Apparel, a former Canadian clothing brand unrelated to any of the below
- Target Australia, an Australian retail chain similar to, but not associated with, Target Corporation
- Target Books, a publishing imprint
- Target Corporation, an American retail chain founded by John Geisse
  - Target Canada, its defunct Canadian subsidiary
- TARGET (NGO), a human rights organization founded by Rüdiger Nehberg
- Target Video, a San Francisco-based video and film studio
- TechTarget, an American company

== Computing and technology ==
- The platform that a cross compiler is generating code for
- A debugger term referring to the subject of testing or debugging
- TARGET Services, a set of Eurozone financial market infrastructures
- TARGET 3001!, a computer-aided design (CAD) program
- The file that a symbolic link refers to
- Target (project), a collaborative research project in the Netherlands

== See also ==
- Human Target (disambiguation)
- Targeteer (disambiguation)
- Targeting (disambiguation)
