= Barcham (disambiguation) =

Barcham (Persian: برچم) is a village in Iran.

Barcham may also refer to:

- Andy Barcham, British footballer
- Barcham Trees, British tree grower

== See also ==
- Gol, Gilan or Barchaman Gol, village in Iran
