= Emanuel Moriatis =

Argentine racing driver

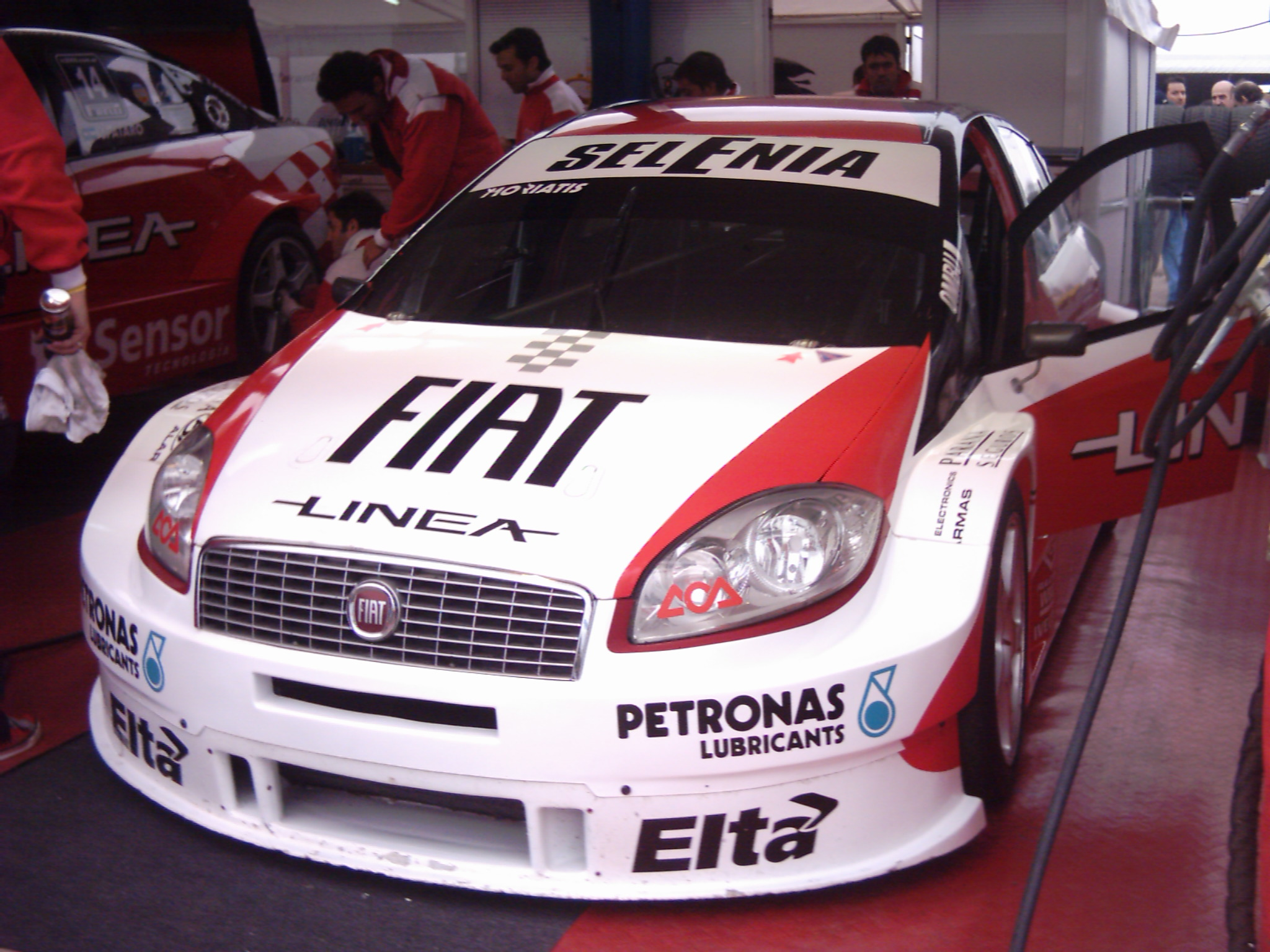
Moriatis' Fiat Linea at the fifth round of the 2010 TC 2000 season at Autódromo Santiago Yaco Guarnieri.

Emanuel Alexis Moriatis (born January 19, 1980) is an Argentine racing driver. He won the Turismo Carretera championship in 2009, and the Turismo Nacional Clase 3 championship in 2012 and 2016.

== Career ==
Moriatis started his motorsport career in quad racing. In 1998 he made his debut in car racing and the following year he made his debut in the Turismo Nacional championship (Clase 2). In 2002 he made his debut in Turismo Carretera, in 2005 in Top Race V6 and in 2009 in TC 2000, winning the private drivers' championship that year. Also in 2009, he won the TC title, against Mariano Altuna and José María López.

In the 2010 TC 2000 season, Moriatis raced with the Fiat Argentina factory team.

In the Clase 3 of Turismo Nacional, Moriatis achieved two championships (2012 and 2016) until he left the series in 2019.

== Personal life ==
Moriatis was born in Lanús, Argentina, and is of Greek descent.

Sporting positions
| Preceded by Guillermo Ortelli | Turismo Carretera champion 2009 | Succeeded by Agustín Canapino |
| Preceded by Fabián Yannantuoni | Turismo Nacional Clase 3 champion 2012 | Succeeded by Facundo Chapur |
| Preceded by Facundo Chapur | Turismo Nacional Clase 3 champion 2016 | Succeeded by Mariano Werner |
