= Goal (disambiguation) =

A goal is an objective that a person or a system plans or intends to achieve.

Goal may also refer to:

== Sport ==
- Goal (sports), a method of scoring in many sports, or the physical structure or area where scoring occurs
  - Goals, the goal frame in association football
- Scoring in association football, goal scored when the ball passes completely over a goal line
  - Andrés Cantor (born 1962), Argentine sportscaster known for popularizing the extended "¡Gooool!" ("Goal!") interjection
- Goal (ice hockey), scored when the puck completely crosses the goal line
  - The Goal, the winning goal of the 1972 Summit Series
- Scoring in Gaelic games, for games such as hurling, camogie, and Gaelic football
- Drop goal, a scoring method used in rugby
- Field goal, a scoring method used in American and Canadian football
- Field goal (basketball), a basket scored on any shot other than a free throw

== Arts, entertainment and media ==
=== Films ===
- Goal (1936 film), a 1936 Argentine sports film directed by Luis Moglia Barth
- Goal! (film series), a trilogy of football films
  - Goal! (film), 2005 British film
  - Goal II: Living the Dream, 2007 sequel
  - Goal III: Taking on the World, 2009 straight-to-DVD release
- Goal (2007 Hindi film), a 2007 Bollywood Hindi-language film based on football in the Asian community in England; titled Dhan Dhana Dhan Goal in India.
- Goal (2007 Malayalam film), a 2007 Malayalam film directed by Kamal
- Goal (2018 film), a 2018 Sinhala film
- Goal!, the 1966 official FIFA World Cup film

=== Games ===
- Goal! (video game), a 1988 game for the Nintendo Entertainment System
- Goals (video game), a 2026 free-to-play video game for Windows, macOS, PlayStation 5, Xbox Series X and S
- Dino Dini's Goal, a 1993 game for Amiga, Atari ST and PC

=== Literature ===
- Goal (children's novel), a children's novel by Michael Hardcastle
- The Goal (novel), a 1984 management-oriented novel by Eliyahu M. Goldratt

=== Music ===
- "Goals" (song), by Lisa, Anitta, and Rema, 2026
- "Goals", by Anitta, 2018
- "Goals", by M.I.A., 2017
- "Goals", by Sophie Powers, 2025
- "Goals", by YoungBoy Never Broke Again, 2022

== Other uses ==
- GOAL (organization), a charitable organisation founded by Irish humanitarian John O'Shea
- Goal (website), a football news website owned by FootballCo.
- Goal mac Morn or Goll mac Morna, a character in Irish mythology
- Global Overseas Adoptees' Link, a South Korean agency that aids Korean overseas adoptees
- GOAL agent programming language, a high-level programming language for programming rational agents
- Game Oriented Assembly Lisp, a video game programming language
- A trade name for the herbicide oxyfluorfen
- GOALTV, a defunct television channel

== See also ==
- Gaol or jail, a prison or remand center
- Goal line (disambiguation)
- Gol (disambiguation)
- Gole (disambiguation)
- Object (disambiguation)
- Objective (disambiguation)
- Purpose (disambiguation)
- Targeting (disambiguation)
