= Gole =

Gole may refer to:

- Grand Orange Lodge of England
- Gole, Kuyavian-Pomeranian Voivodeship, Poland
- Gole, Masovian Voivodeship, Poland
- Gole (surname), a family name (including a list of people with that name)

== See also ==
- Göle, small city and surrounding district in Turkey
- Budy-Gole, village in Greater Poland Voivodeship, Poland
- Goal (disambiguation)
- Gol (disambiguation)
