= Targeteer (disambiguation) =

A targeteer is a military or intelligence officer who is responsible for bomb-attack plans.

Targeteer may also refer to:

- USS Targeteer (YV-3), an LSM(R)-501-class landing ship medium (rocket)
- Targeteer (pistol), an air pistol made by Daisy Outdoor Products
- Target and the Targeteers, a trio of superheroes who first appeared in 1940 in Target Comics
