= Targeting =

Targeting may refer to:

== Biology ==
- Gene targeting
- Protein targeting

== Marketing ==
- Behavioral targeting
- Targeted advertising
- Target market
- Geotargeting, in internet marketing

== Other uses ==
- Geographic targeting
- Inflation targeting, in economics
- Targeted therapy, the use of molecules to selectively interfere with cancer cells
- Targeting (gridiron football), a penalty
- Targeting (politics), to determine where to spend the resources of time, money, manpower and attention when campaigning for election
- Targeting (video games), a controversial strategy in online gaming where a player continuously attacks the same opponent
- Targeting (warfare), to select objects or installations to be attacked, taken, or destroyed
- Targeting pod, in warfare
- Targeting tower, a radio frequency antenna

== See also ==
- Goal (disambiguation)
- Target (disambiguation)
