= Volkswagen Gol =

Subcompact car manufactured by Volkswagen do Brasil

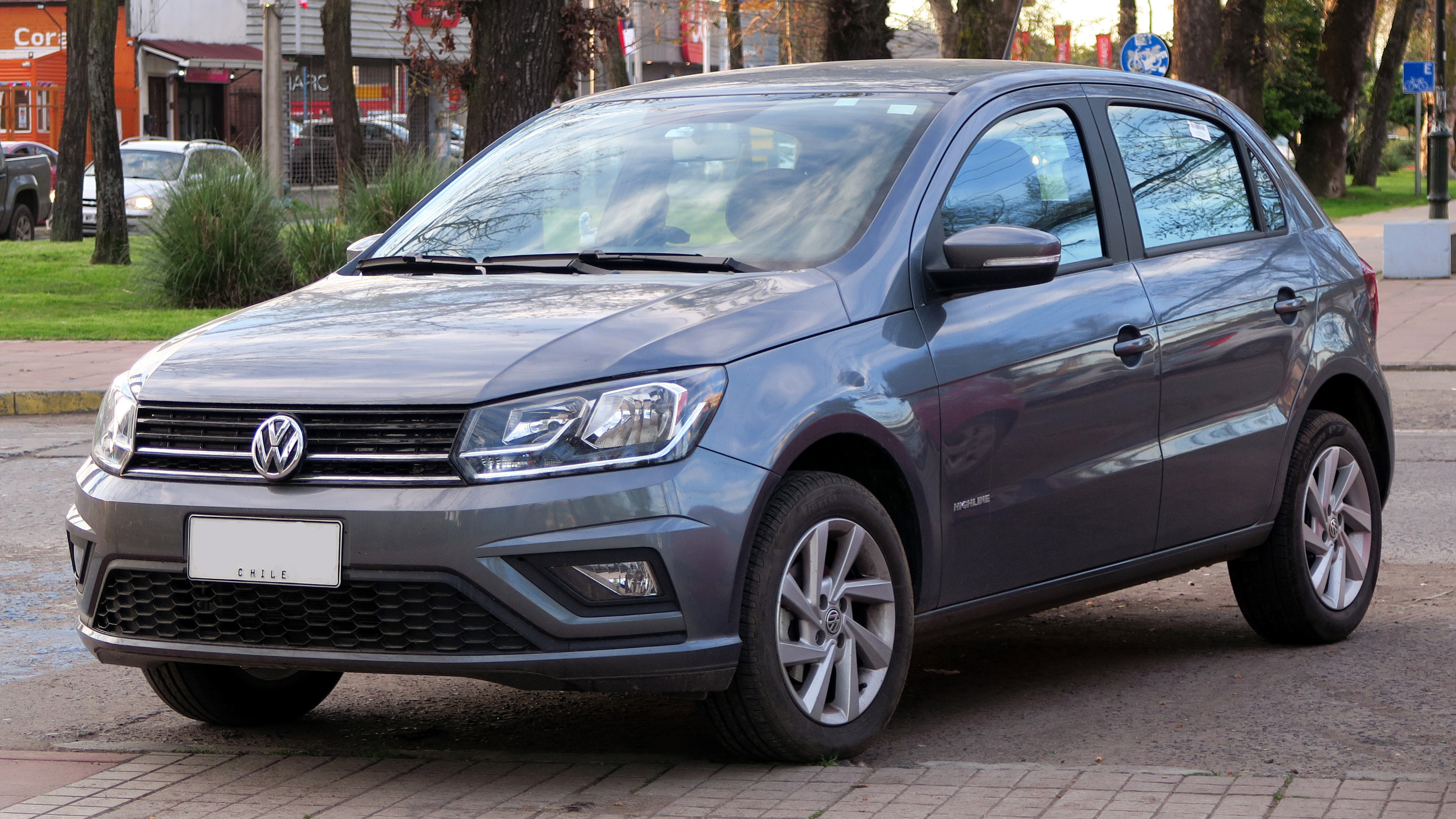

Overview
- Manufacturer: Volkswagen
- Also called: Volkswagen Voyage (Sedan); Volkswagen Parati (Station Wagon); Volkswagen Saveiro (Pick-up); Volkswagen Gacel (Argentina); Volkswagen Fox (North America); Volkswagen Gol Country; Volkswagen Pointer (Mexico)
- Production: 1980–2023; 1982–present (Saveiro)

Body and chassis
- Class: Subcompact car/Supermini (B)
- Body style: 3/5-door hatchback 2/4-door sedan 2-door coupé utility
- Layout: Front-engine, front-wheel-drive
- Platform: Volkswagen Group A04 hybrid platform

Chronology
- Predecessor: Volkswagen Brasilia; Volkswagen Fusca (Beetle)
- Successor: Volkswagen Polo Track; Volkswagen Tera; Volkswagen Tukan (Saveiro)

The Volkswagen Gol is a subcompact car that was manufactured by Volkswagen do Brasil from 1980 to 2023 as Volkswagen's entry-level car in the Latin American market—where it succeeded the Volkswagen Type 1 (Fusca) and the Volkswagen Brasilia. Several variants of the Gol-derived Voyage and Parati were marketed in North America as the Volkswagen Fox from 1987 to 1993.

The Gol has been produced in several variants, such as three- and five-door hatchbacks, two- and four-door sedans (the Volkswagen Voyage), three- and five-door station wagons (the Volkswagen Parati), and two-door single and extra-cab coupé utilities (the Volkswagen Saveiro).

The Gol was the best-selling car in Brazil for 27 consecutive years, from 1987 to 2014, and has been the most popular car in Argentina since 1988; approximately five million Gols have been manufactured in South America since 1980. In March 2013 it was announced that cumulative production of the Gol and its derivatives (Voyage, Saveiro, Parati) had reached 10 million units. It takes its name from the Portuguese (and Spanish) word for goal in football, taking advantage of the Brazilians' passion for the sport.

Following a continuous production for 43 years, the production of the Gol ended in 2023. A downgraded version of the Volkswagen Polo called the Polo Track became its replacement.

== Body styles ==
The Gol family contains several body styles. The three- and five-door hatchback variants are known as the Volkswagen Gol in most markets, with the exception of Egypt, Ukraine and CIS, where they are marketed as the Volkswagen Pointer. The first-generation Gol was available only as a three-door hatchback; all generations since have offered a five-door variant as well.

The sedan has only been produced for the first and third (current) generations. The Brazilian-built sedans were marketed as the Volkswagen Voyage, while the Argentinian ones were referred to as the Volkswagen Gacel. In the United States and Canada, they were sold as the Volkswagen Fox. After a facelift in 1991, Argentinian-built, entry-level models were renamed the Volkswagen Senda. In the second generation this model was replaced by the Volkswagen Polo Mk3 Classic, which was still sold in Mexico and Argentina. But a new Voyage notchback sedan returned in 2008 for the third generation.

The Volkswagen Parati is a station wagon built on both generations since May 1982. The Parati I was a three-door sold in North America as the Fox Wagon. The second-generation Parati is sold in Argentina as the Gol Country. A five-door version was added in 1997 and the three-door version was dropped after the first facelift (G3). It is named after Paraty, a city on the southern coast of Rio de Janeiro state. It was formerly called Pointer Station Wagon in Mexico and it was sold there between 1999 and 2005. In 2012, The Parati was discontinued and replaced by the SpaceFox.

The Volkswagen Saveiro is a lightweight pickup truck. All Gol generations have been sold with this bodystyle, which was introduced to the market in 1982. It is named after a traditional Brazilian fishing boat. It has been sold as the Pointer Pick Up in Mexico since 1999.

== First generation (Typ 30, 1980) ==
First generation (G1)
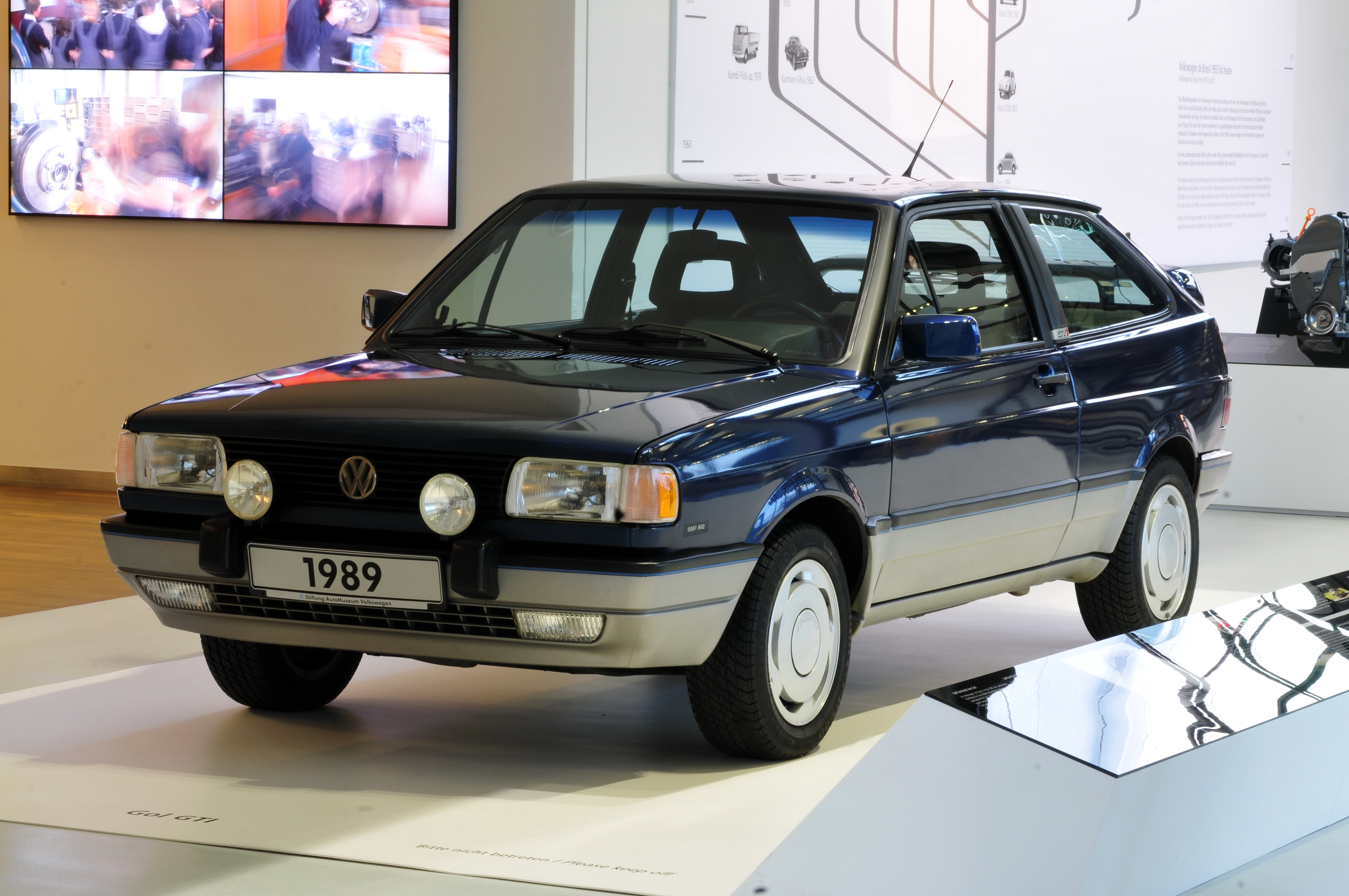
- 1989 Volkswagen Gol GTI

Overview
- Also called: Volkswagen Fox; Volkswagen Gacel; Volkswagen Parati; Volkswagen Pointer; Volkswagen Senda; Volkswagen Voyage
- Production: 1980–1996
- Assembly: Brazil: São Bernardo do Campo; Brazil: Taubaté; Argentina: Buenos Aires province; Uruguay: Nueva Palmira

Body and chassis
- Body style: 3-door hatchback 3-door station wagon 2/4-door sedan 2-door coupé utility
- Platform: Volkswagen Group BX platform

Powertrain
- Engine: 1.0 L I4 (gasoline); 1.3 L H4 (gasoline); 1.5 L I4 (gasoline); 1.6 L H4 (gasoline); 1.8 L I4 (gasoline); 2.0 L I4 (gasoline); 1.6 L I4 (diesel)
- Transmission: 4-speed manual 5-speed manual

Dimensions
- Wheelbase: 2,358 mm (92.8 in)
- Length: Hatchback: 3,810 mm (150.0 in); Sedan/wagon: 4,150 mm (163.4 in); Pick-up: 4,060 mm (159.8 in)
- Width: Hatchback/sedan: 1,600 mm (63.0 in); Wagon/pick-up: 1,622 mm (63.9 in)
- Height: Hatchback/sedan: 1,363 mm (53.7 in); Wagon/pick-up: 1,385 mm (54.5 in)

The Gol was released in 1980 to replace the Brasilia, which was in turn a replacement for the Beetle on the Brazilian market. It was based on its own unique BX platform derived from the existing VW/Audi B1 and B2 platforms. With a design specific to Latin America, the Gol featured the 1.3-liter air-cooled, flat-four engine from the Beetle, but front-mounted. A 1.6-liter engine was added later. The Voyage two-door sedan variant of the Gol was released in June 1981 and received a 1.5-liter inline water-cooled gasoline engine instead. The same engine was offered with an ethanol option. In 1985, the air-cooled engine of the Gol was replaced by a 1.6-liter (and later 1.8-liter as well) longitudinally-mounted water-cooled gasoline inline-four engine from the Passat. By May 1982 the Voyage 1.5 was upgraded to 1.6. In 1984 a water-cooled Voyage 1.8 ("Super") was launched as a higher-level option. A 1.6-liter diesel engine was made, although only for export as diesel engines are not allowed in passenger cars in the Brazilian market.

In January 1983 a four-door Voyage sedan was released. It was known as the VW Amazon in some export markets, later as the Fox in North America. The four-door Voyage was built in the Autolatina Pacheco factory in Buenos Aires, Argentina from 1983 to 1994. It was sold under the name Gacel (later also as the Senda) with the Argentine-built 1.6 OHC engine with a carburettor, later also with a diesel 1.6.

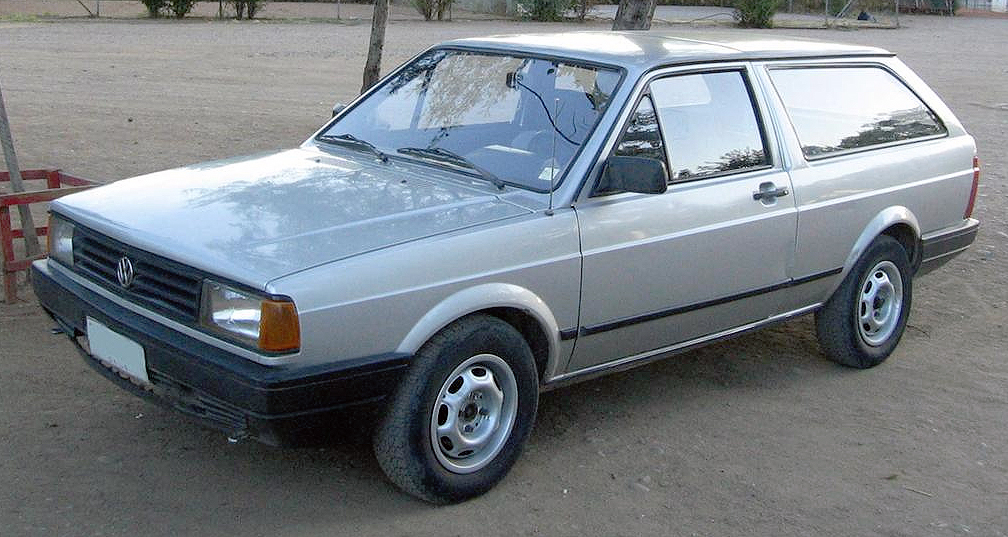
1990 Volkswagen Parati

The first generation (or "G1") Gol had two mild facelifts for 1987 and 1991. The 1989 Gol GTi was the first Brazilian-built car to use fuel injection. The 2.0-liter inline-four engine was the same used by the Santana. In 1991, as a result of changes to the tax laws in Brazil, a flurry of cars with engines under one liters appeared. Fiat was first (with the Fiat Mille), and Volkswagen quickly responded with the spartan Gol 1000. It had a Ford-developed 997 cc engine (a result of their recent Autolatina joint venture) with 50 hp (37 kW) and was not available in any other bodystyle. Between 1990 and 1995, the Ford CHT 1.6 replaced the original 1.6 in the range, also as a result of the Autolatina lineup.

=== Sports versions ===
==== GT 1.8 (1984–1986) ====
The Gol GT 1.8 was the BX family's first sports version and an answer to the Ford Escort XR3, a successful sports car in the Brazilian market. With a 1.8 liter engine borrowed from the Santana (MkII Passat), the Gol GT was much faster than the Escort XR3, but externally did not have the same beauty. The first series still had a four-speed manual gearbox, but soon this was changed to a five-speed unit.

==== GTS 1.8 (1987–1994) ====
The successor of the Gol GT, the GTS, had an updated design, following the new 87 BX line up style and also featuring new accessories that were not available before, such as a rear spoiler and side skirts. The 1.8 liter engine produced 94 hp (70 kW) running on gasoline or 99 hp (74 kW) running on ethanol. The GTS was a very successful model and was kept in production alongside the upcoming GTI.

==== GTI 2000 (1989–1994) ====
Known as the first Brazilian built car equipped with electronic fuel injection, the Gol GTI was presented in January 1989 and featured a larger 2.0 liter engine with power of 121 PS (89 kW; 119 hp) running only on gasoline. It has a claimed top speed of 185 km/h (115 mph). This engine was the same as used in the larger Santana, albeit fitted with fuel injection for the GTI.

=== North America ===
Volkswagen Group of America marketed variants of the Gol (manufactured by Volkswagen do Brasil) in North America as entry-level models from February 1987 until 1993 under the Volkswagen Fox nameplate. It was intended to provide Volkswagen dealers with a competitor to the then very successful Hyundai Excel and Yugo low-price cars. Initially offered as a two-door and four-door sedan as well as a two-door wagon, the wagon was discontinued for the 1991 model year along with the two-door sedan for the Canadian market. That same year the remaining Fox versions received a mild restyling.

All North American models employed a longitudinally-mounted inline-four 1.8 L gasoline engine producing 81 hp (60 kW) at 5,500 rpm and 93 lb⋅ft (126 N⋅m) of torque at 3,250 rpm.

Early models (1987–1990) featured Bosch CIS-E type Jetronic electro-mechanical fuel injection, using an oxygen sensor to assist in fuel management. Later models (1991–1993) employed Bosch Digifant electronic fuel injection. In Canada from 1987 to early 1988 it was offered with the simpler Bosch CIS fuel injection system without an oxygen sensor or catalytic converter for the engine fuel management system.

Over the course of its model history, trim levels included base Fox, GL, GTS, GLS, GL Sport, Polo, and a Wolfsburg Edition. Options included air conditioning, five-speed (vs. four) manual transmission and metallic paint. No automatic transmission was offered. The GL trim featured revised cloth trim, rear license plate backing, ceiling-mounted map light, glove compartment light, trunk light, tachometer (excepting wagon models), body-colored bumpers, hubcaps, passenger side exterior rear view mirror, 175/70-13 tires, locking gas cap and three-point rear seat belts.

1990 and later US models featured "automatic" non-motorized front seat shoulder belts along with a knee-bar and manual front lap belts, while Canadian models retained the manual pillar-mounted front seat belts.

The 1991 facelift included revised grille, headlights, turn signals, badges, and hubcaps, as well as reduction of towing hooks from four to two.

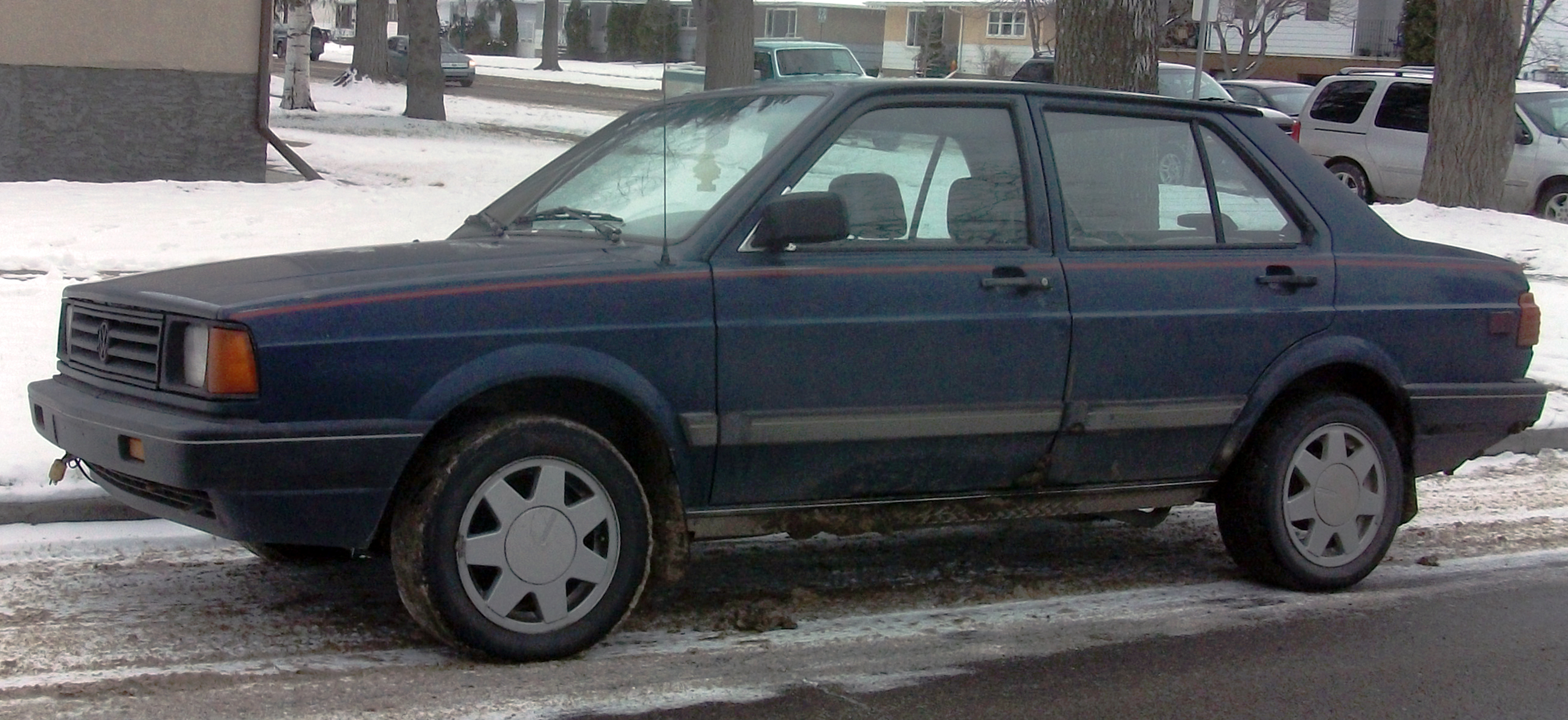
1987–1990 Volkswagen Fox 4-door sedan

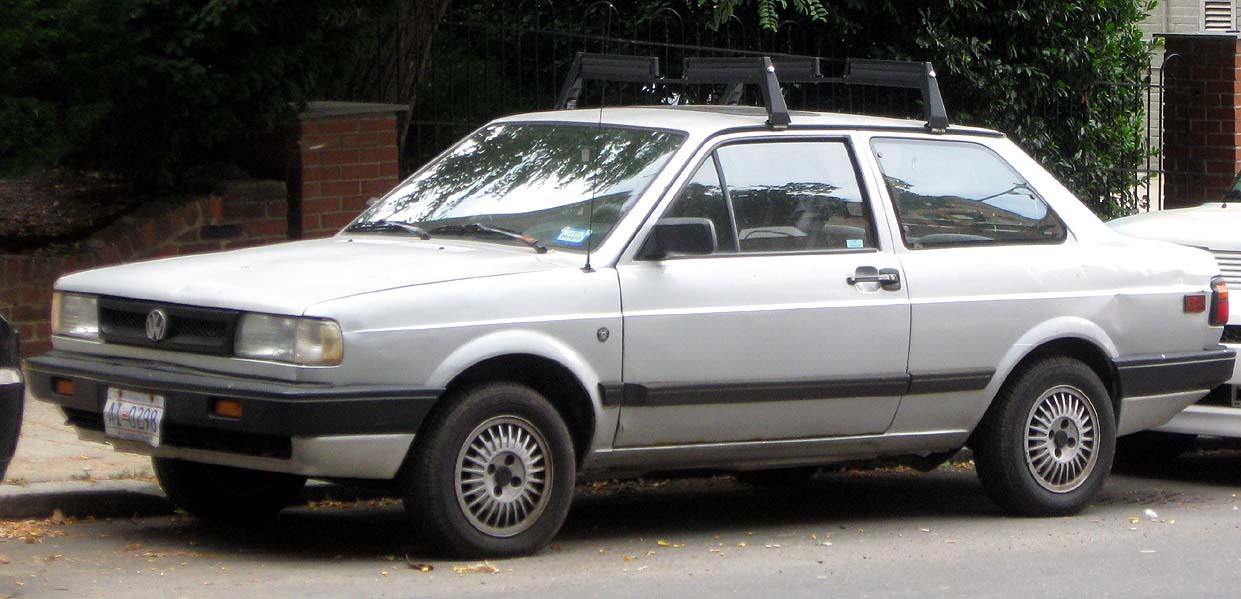
1991–1993 Volkswagen Fox 2-door sedan

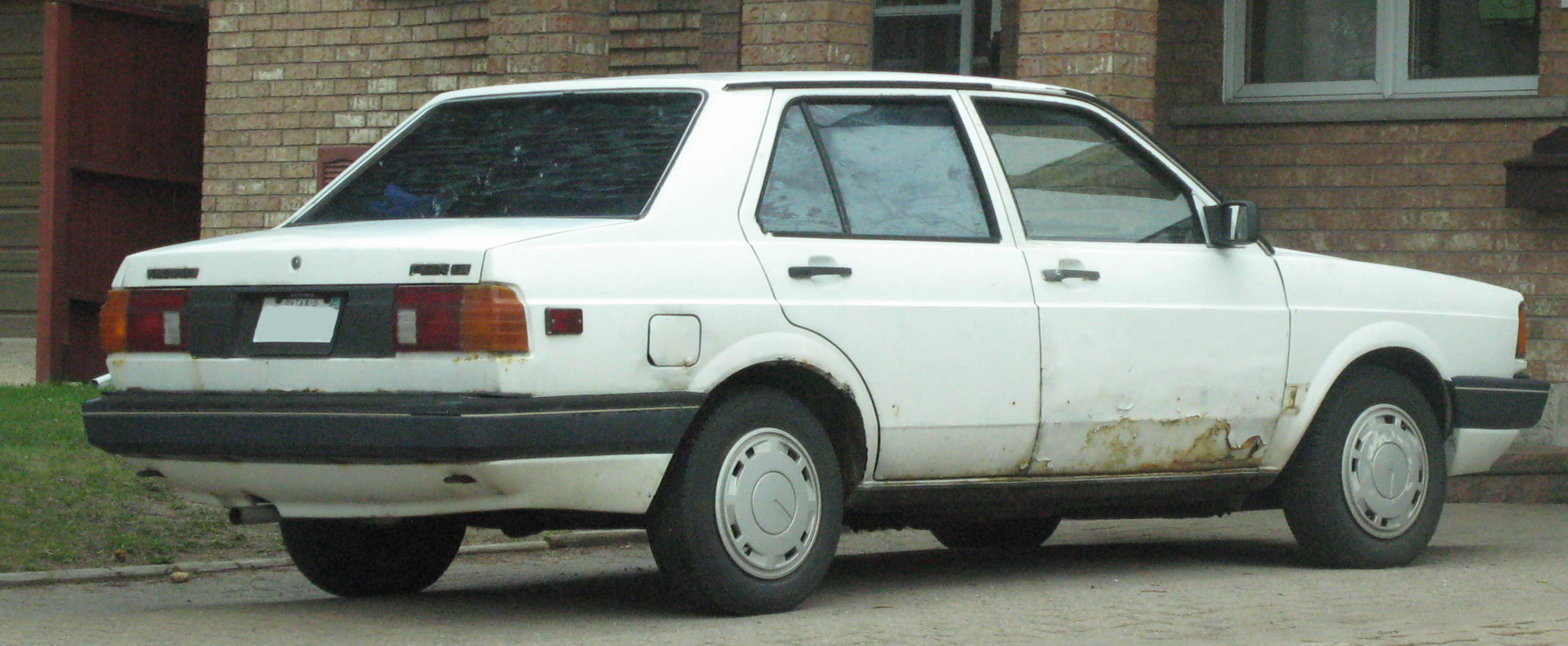
1987 Volkswagen Fox GL 4-door sedan (rear)

== Second generation (Typ 37/5X/5W, 1994) ==
Second generation (G2/G3/G4)
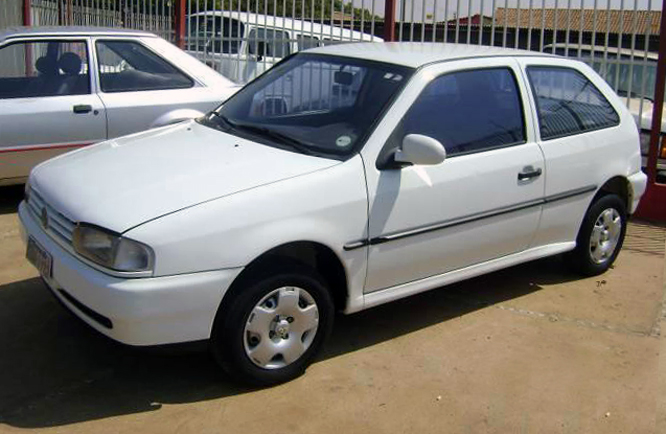

Overview
- Also called: Volkswagen Parati; Volkswagen Pointer; Volkswagen Saveiro
- Production: 1994–2015
- Assembly: Brazil: São Bernardo do Campo Taubaté; Argentina: General Pacheco; China: Anting (SAIC-VW); Iran: Bam (Khodrosazan Bam)

Body and chassis
- Body style: 3/5-door hatchback 3/5-door station wagon 2-door coupé utility
- Platform: Volkswagen Group BX platform

Powertrain
- Engine: 1.0 L AE-1000 I4; 1.0 L AT-1000 8/16V I4; 1.0 L AT-1000 turbo I4; 1.6 L AP-1600 I4; 1.8 L AP-1800 I4; 2.0 L AP-2000 I4; 1.9 L diesel I4
- Transmission: 5-speed manual

Dimensions
- Wheelbase: Hatchback/st. wagon: 2,470 mm (97.2 in); Pick-up: 2,600 mm (102.4 in)
- Length: Hatchback: 3,830 mm (150.8 in); Station wagon: 4,190 mm (165.0 in); Pick-up: 4,450 mm (175.2 in)
- Width: 1,640 mm (64.6 in)
- Height: 1,420 mm (55.9 in)

The second generation (or "G2") Gol, known as Project AB9 during development, debuted in September 1994. It was still based on the BX platform, and is very different from the earlier model, with an updated body and longer wheelbase than the 1980 original. Nicknamed "Gol Bolinha" (roughly "Rounded Gol" or "Bubble Gol"), the previous generation started to be nicknamed as "Gol Quadrado", "Squared Gol". The new version was an answer to the then newly released Chevrolet Corsa.

The Gol G2 was available in the following versions: 1000i, 1000i Plus, CL, GL, Furgão (Van) and GTi (this was fitted with an 8-valve engine until 1996, when a more powerful, German-built 16-valve version replaced it), with 1.0, 1.6, 1.8, and 2.0 liter engines. The 1.0 was supplied by Ford, as part of the AutoLatina collaboration. The Gol G2 also had two special editions. The first, "Gol Rolling Stones", was in 1995 - commemorating that band's "Voodoo Lounge Tour" leg in Brazil. Then, the following year came "Gol Atlanta" (after the Olympic Games). In November 1996, Volkswagen began to produce its own 1.0 engine, called the AT-1000. This version was derived from their larger 1.6 (999 cc).

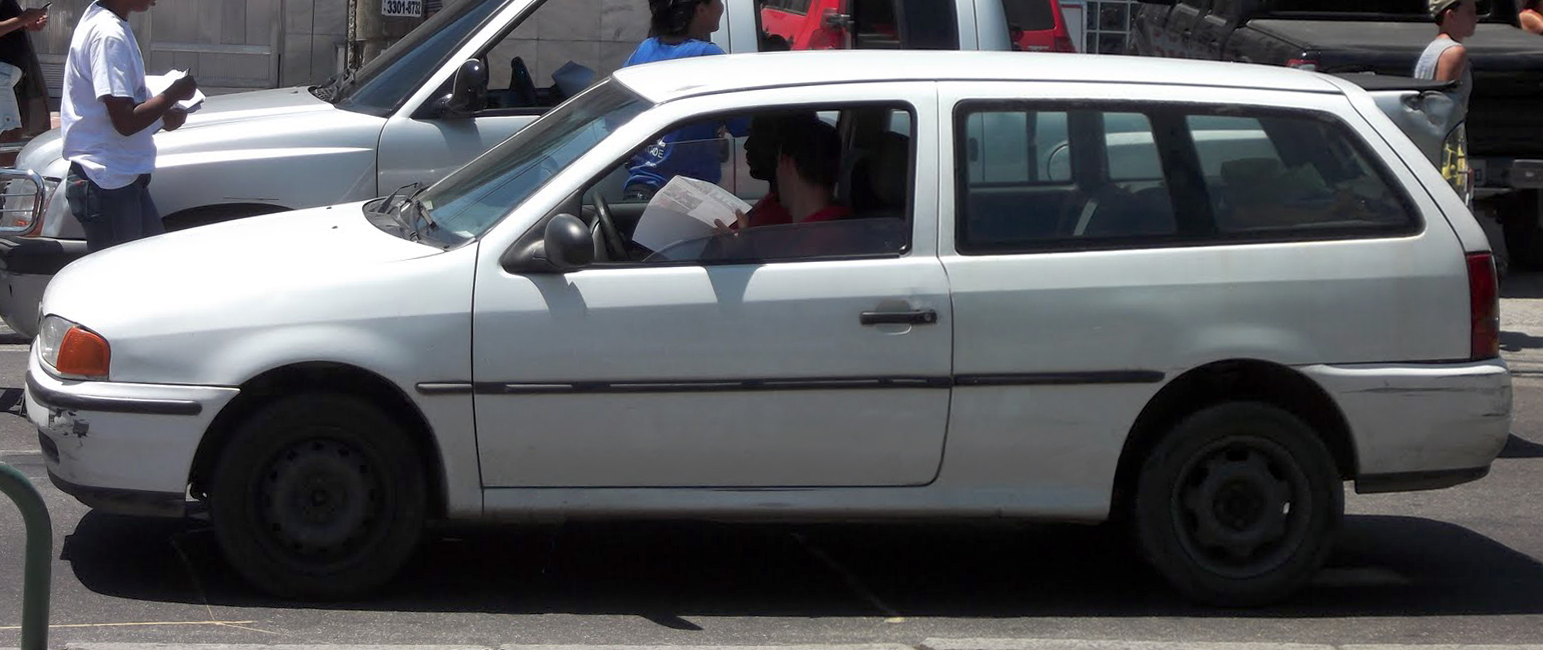
1996 Volkswagen Parati (G2)

As the Ford-built engine had been in limited supply, Volkswagen could now ramp up production of their entry level Gols beginning in January 1997. There were also 16 valve versions of the 1.0 AT-1000 engine launched in September 1996. The 1.0 16V has 76 PS (56 kW; 75 hp), up from 54 PS (40 kW; 53 hp) in the eight-valve version. In 1995 the Autolatina partnership was dissolved. In 1998, a 1.9 liter diesel engine was installed in the Gol G2, only sold in markets outside of Brazil.

Also this version of Gol had some chronic deficiencies of design, such as bad alignment of body parts, due to problems with the robots on the assembly line, and poor quality of plastic parts. A curious fact about this version of Gol is that the driver's seat is not well aligned with the steering wheel and pedals, causing a rather uncomfortable driving position. Another surprise was Volkswagen's original decision to sell the Gol and Parati (station wagon) only in three-door version, a step which was not appreciated by buyers. Fiat took the top spot in the Brazilian market for the last months of 1997, but once Volkswagen released quickly developed five-door models the Gol and Parati propelled Volkswagen back into first place in early 1998.

=== G3 and G4 facelifts ===
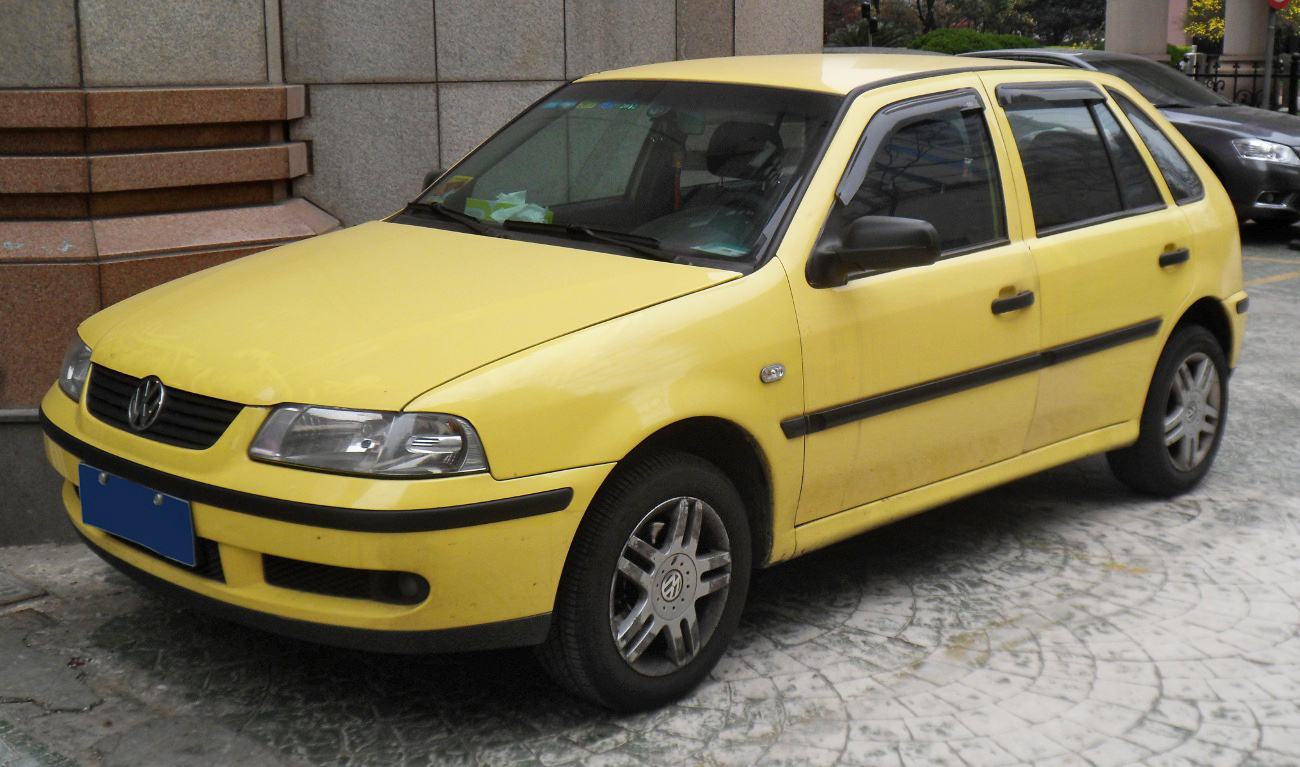
2000 Volkswagen Gol (G3; China)

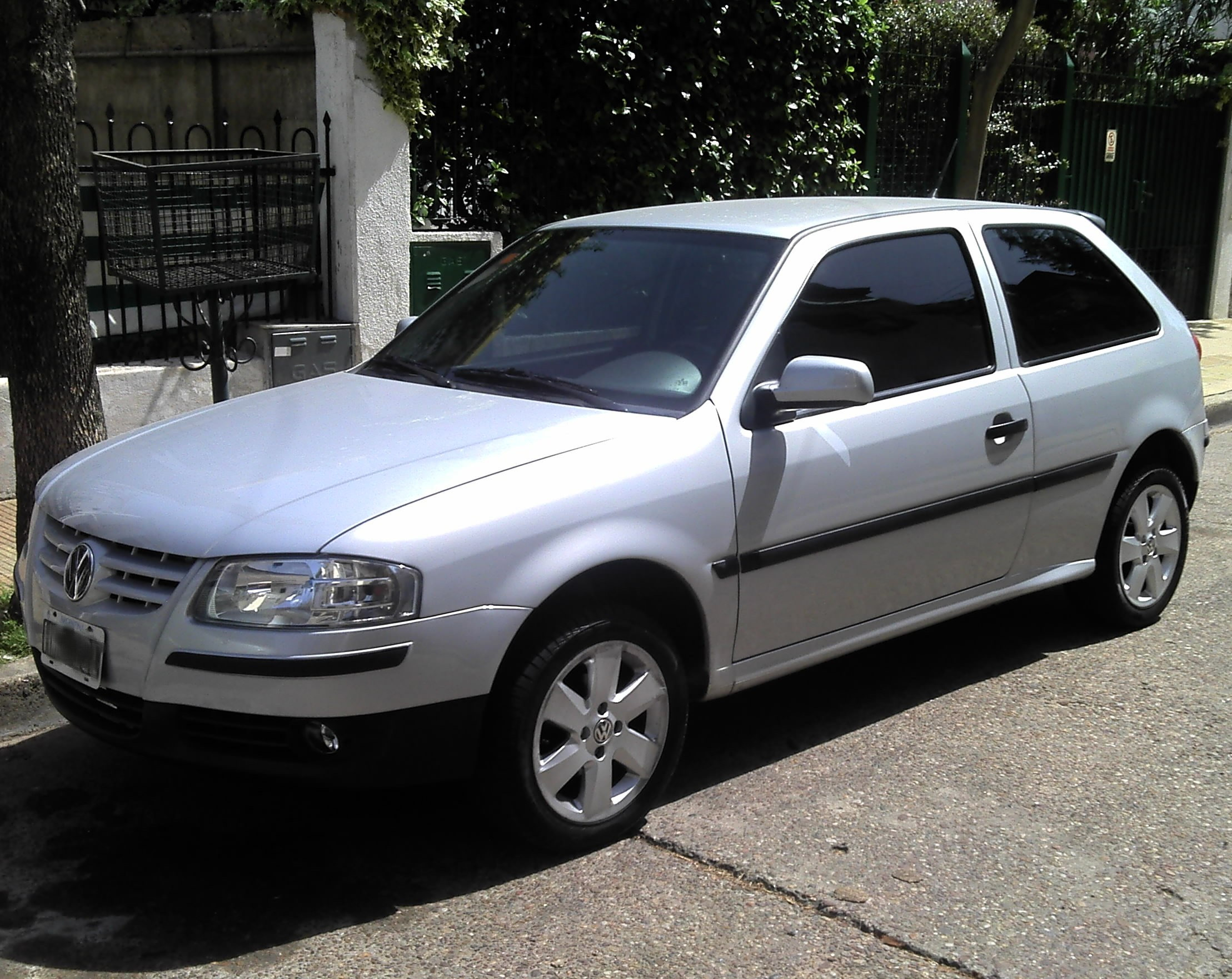
2005 Volkswagen Gol (G4)

The second-generation Gol received two facelifts, which include both cosmetic and engine upgrades.

The first upgrade, in 1999 for 2000 model, was known as the Gol G3 (photo) in Brazil and had a new VW 'corporate' front end similar to the Jetta/Bora IV. The Gol G3 came with optional airbags and ABS brakes. The previous (G2) Gol 1.0 continued to be available as the "Gol Special", to fight for the lowest end of the market. Following the Mercosur economic crisis beginning with the Brazilian devaluation in 1999, the lineup was reduced in 2002. The 2.0 16V was discontinued, while the 1.8 was withdrawn from some markets. Argentinian production of the Gol was halted in 2003. Instead the engines at the bottom of the lineup were improved, with the 112 PS (82 kW) 1.0 16V Turbo engine released in 2000.

When the G4 facelift Gol was released in August 2005, it featured styling cues from the Volkswagen Fox, incorporating the new "V" grille. It also received a new interior which showed evidence of severe cost cutting, changing the instrumentation from the G3's blue-lit setup to the Fox's single gauge cluster including a small, central digital display. The G4 was partially replaced by the next generation in 2008, leaving only a limited lineup of lower-end models, only with the 1-litre engine. In 2008, the suspension was also revised, while the power output of the 1.0-litre engine increased from 71 to 75 PS (52 to 55 kW). The last remaining G4 models were finally discontinued in early 2014, after ABS brakes and twin airbags became legally required on new cars.

=== Gol Total Flex ===
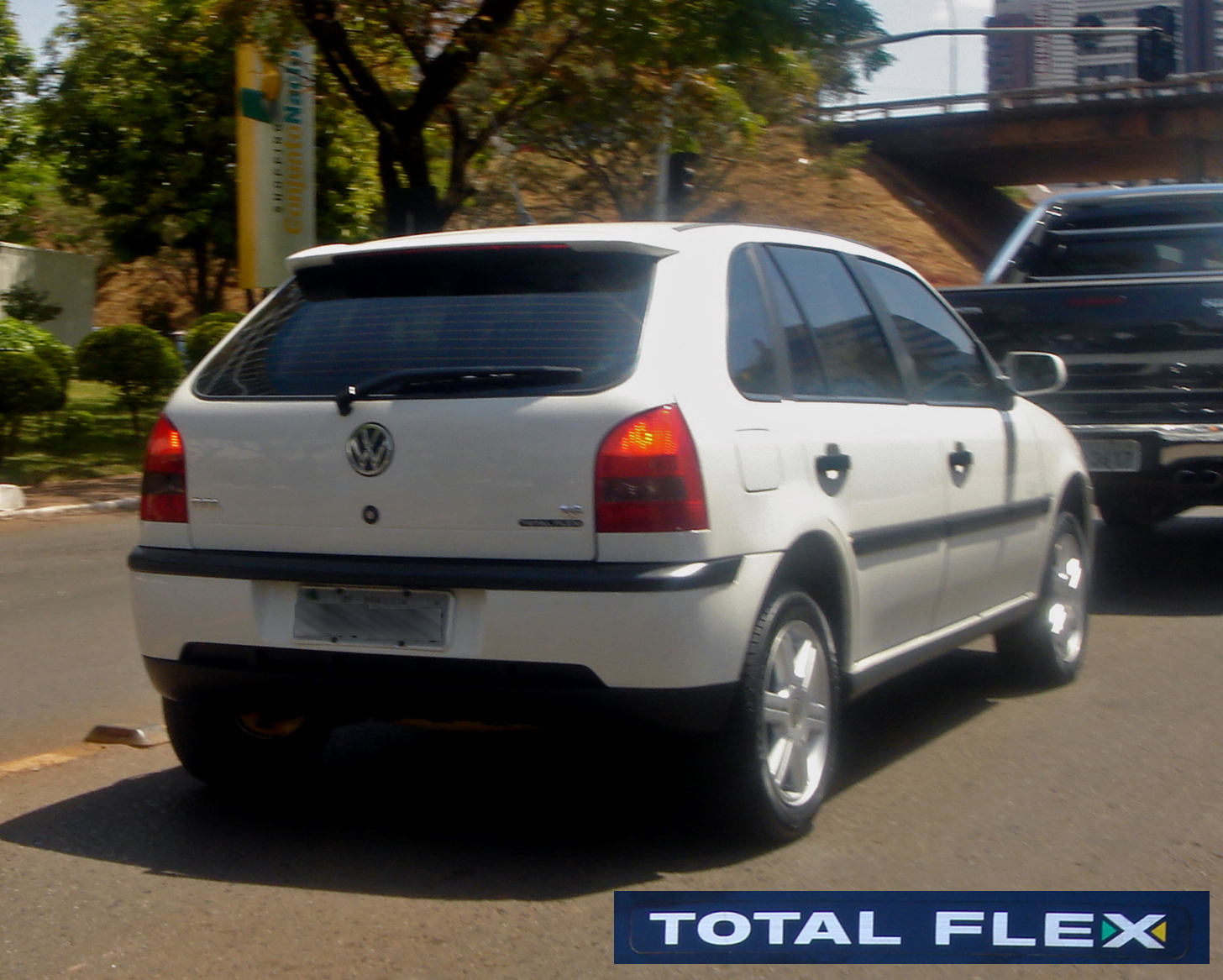
The 2003 Volkswagen Gol 1.6 Total Flex was the first flexible-fuel vehicle produced and sold in Brazil.

The flexible fuel vehicle Gol Total Flex, available since 2003, was the first of its kind in South America. Its introduction followed a rehabilitation of the use of alcohol to power automobiles.

=== Pointer (Mexico) ===
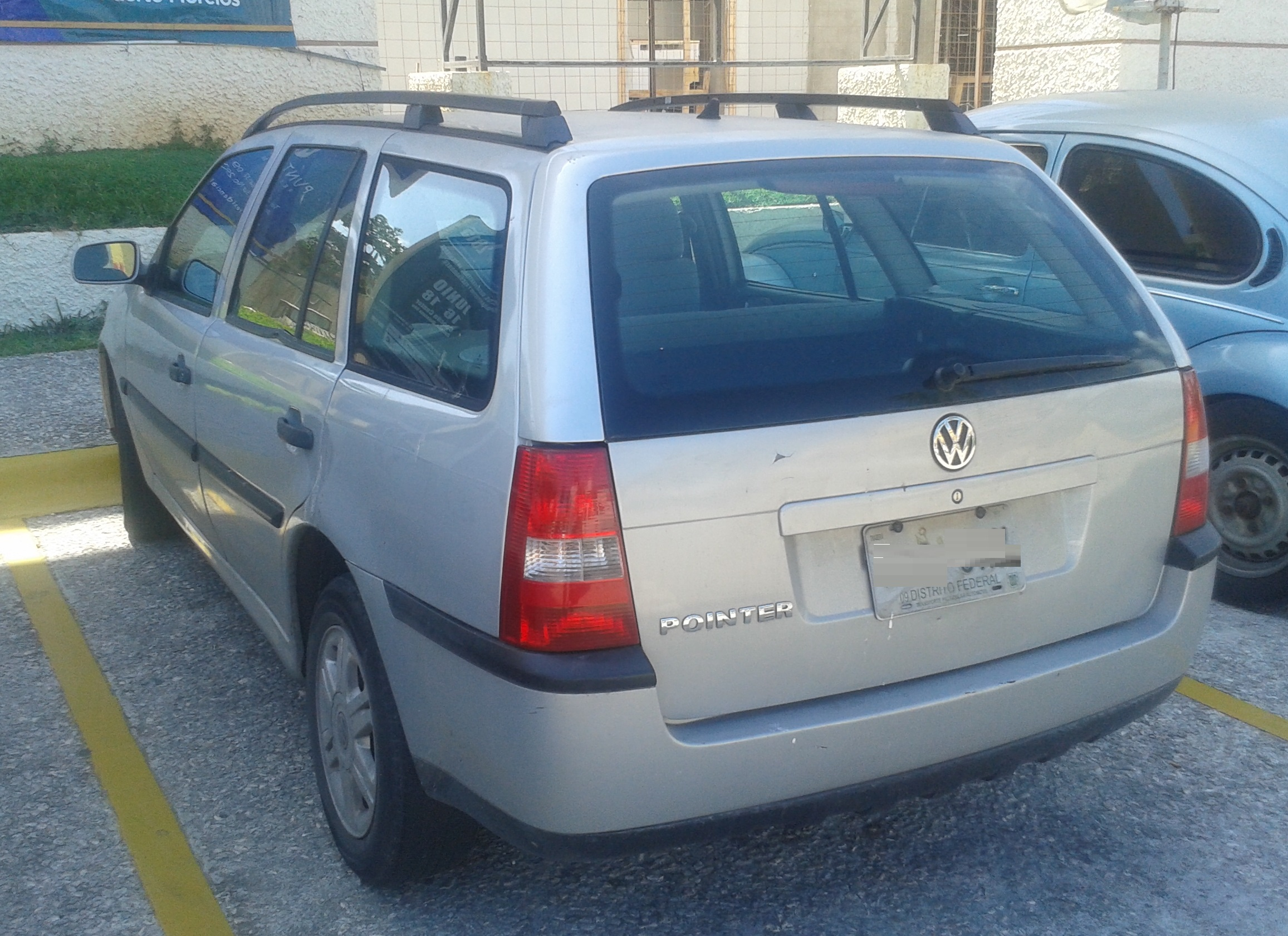
Volkswagen Pointer Station Wagon (Mexico)

The Gol G2 was introduced in Mexico in spring 1998 as the Volkswagen Pointer (a name previously used in Latin America for a rebadged model based on the Ford Escort Mk V, the Pointer/Logus). The only version for this year was a three-door hatchback with a 1.8 liter, 98 hp (73 kW) engine and a five-speed manual gearbox. The only extra cost option available was a package compounding air conditioning and power steering. For 1999, a five-door wagon version, the Brazilian Parati (called the Pointer Station Wagon in Mexico) and the Saveiro (called the Pointer Pick Up) are added. They were marketed in three trim levels: Base, Comfort (A/C and power steering) and Luxe (14" alloy wheels, power windows and remote control centralized door locks, A/C and power steering). For 2000 the Pointer received the same facelift as in Brazil and a sporty Pointer GTI based on the Brazilian Gol GTI is introduced. It was a three-door hatchback with a 2.0 liter, 122 hp (91 kW) engine. It had AM/FM/Cassette radio, alloy wheels, all around disc brakes, and sporty black seats as standard equipment. In 2002 a basic Pointer City version is introduced, the former Comfort version is renamed the Trendline, and the Luxe variant as the Comfortline. In 2005 the Pointer Station Wagon and the Pointer GTI are discontinued and the former Pointer trims (but the City) are replaced by a new Pointer Mi version.

In the 2007 model year, the Pointer receives the newest facelift, and its versions are reorganized. The Pointer is currently marketed as the Base, A/C (Air Conditioning, power steering and rear wiper/washer), Trendline (Radio AM/FM Stereo CD, 15" alloy wheels, fog lamps), and GT (only available as a five-door hatchback. It has the same equipment as the Trendline plus: rear headrests, 6 spoke 15" alloy wheels, black accented headlamps, rear spoiler, and sport seats). The Pointer was replaced in December 2008 by the new Volkswagen Gol G5 which has been launched in Brazil in July 2008.

=== Export ===
Following a joint venture with Kerman Khodro, the Gol was produced in Iran from 2003 to 2010.

The Gol G3 was marketed in Ukraine and the Russian Federation between 2004 and 2006 under the name VW Pointer. Sales were discontinued after a short period because of limited demand. It was offered with either a 1.0-liter engine producing 67 PS (49 kW) or a 1.8-liter engine rated at 100 PS (74 kW).

In China, the Gol G3 was assembled and marketed by Shanghai Volkswagen from February 2003 until 2008.

The model was also sold in Egypt under the Volkswagen Pointer name.

In Taiwan, the Saveiro was marketed as the Volkswagen Pointer and was available exclusively in pick-up form.

In Europe, the Gol was officially exported to Albania and Bulgaria, where it was sold exclusively through two dealerships: Юнитрейд (Unitrade) in Sofia and Автотрейд (Autotrade) in Varna.

== Third generation (Typ 5U, 2008) ==
Third generation (G5/G6/G7/G8)
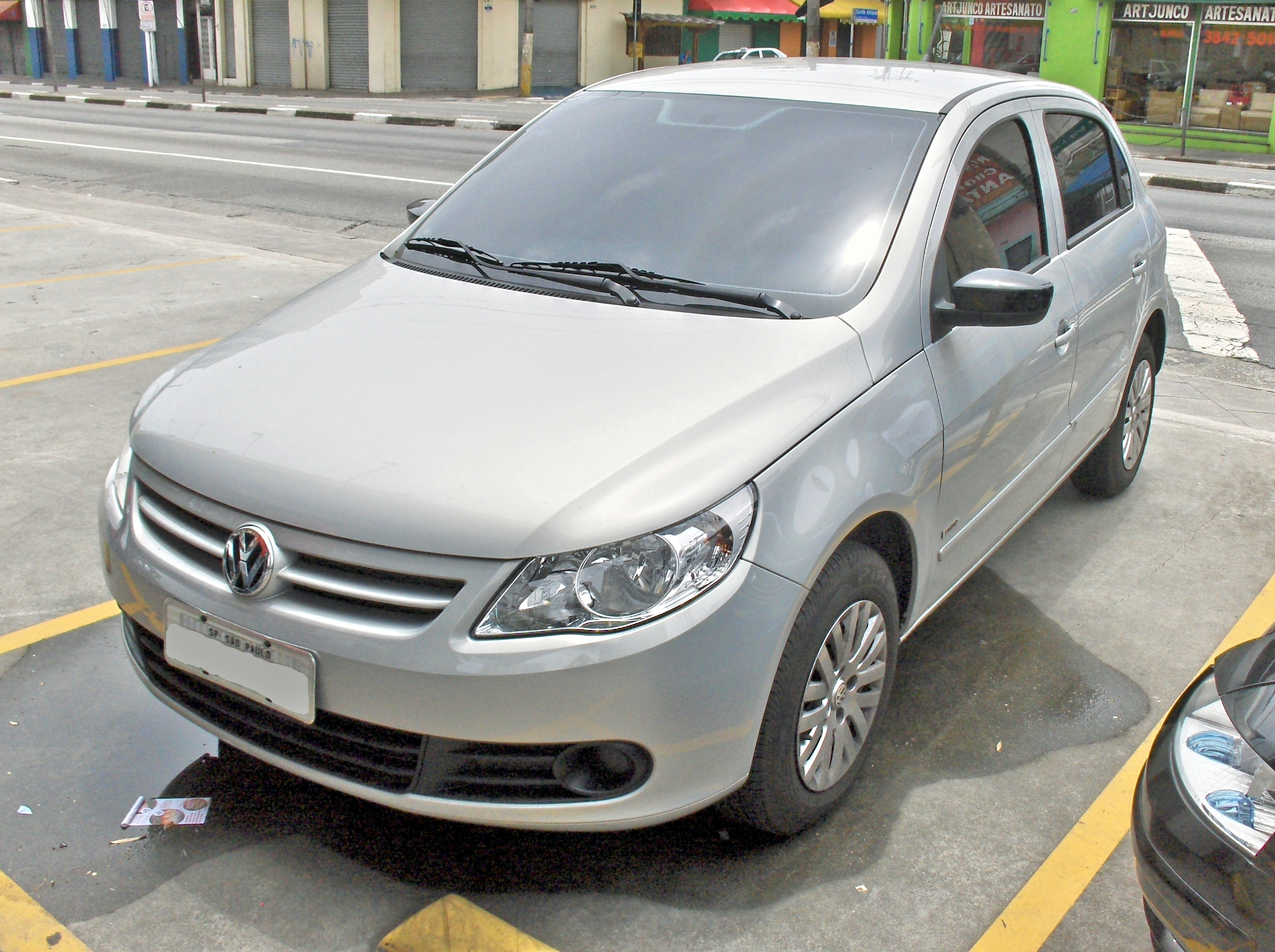
- 2009 Volkswagen Gol 5-door hatchback (Brazil)

Overview
- Also called: Volkswagen Voyage (sedan); Volkswagen Saveiro (pickup)
- Production: 2008–2023 (Gol and Voyage); 2009–present (Saveiro)
- Assembly: Brazil: Taubaté; São Bernardo do Campo (as Saveiro)

Body and chassis
- Body style: 3/5-door hatchback 4-door sedan 2-door coupé utility
- Platform: Volkswagen Group A0 (PQ24) platform

Powertrain
- Engine: 1.0 L VHT I4 8v flex fuel 1.0 L MPI I3 12v flex fuel 1.6 L VHT I4 8v flex fuel 1.6 L MSI I4 16v flex fuel
- Transmission: 5-speed manual 5-speed automated manual 6-speed automatic

Dimensions
- Wheelbase: Hatchback: 2,470 mm (97.2 in); Sedan: 2,465 mm (97.0 in); Pick-up: 2,750 mm (108.3 in)
- Length: 2009–2011 Hatchback: 3,800–3,900 mm (149.6–153.5 in); 2012–2023 Hatchback: 3,799–3,892 mm (149.6–153.2 in); Sedan: 4,230 mm (166.5 in); Pick-up: 4,493 mm (176.9 in)
- Width: 2009–2011 Hatchback: 1,660 mm (65.4 in); 2012–2023 Hatchback: 1,656 mm (65.2 in); Sedan: 1,656 mm (65.2 in); Pick-up: 1,708 mm (67.2 in)
- Height: 2009–2011 Hatchback: 1,450 mm (57.1 in); 2012–2026 Hatchback: 1,452 mm (57.2 in); Sedan: 1,464 mm (57.6 in); Pick-up: 1,497 mm (58.9 in)

Chronology
- Predecessor: Volkswagen Polo Classic (for sedan)
- Successor: Gol: Volkswagen Polo Track; Volkswagen Tera; Voyage: Volkswagen Virtus; Saveiro: Volkswagen Tukan

The third generation of the Gol was released in Brazil, on 29 June 2008, as a 2009 model. The advertisements were filmed in Los Angeles, California, featuring Sylvester Stallone and Gisele Bündchen.

Referred to before its launch as the Gol NF for Nachfolger or Neue Familie (German terms for "successor" and "new family" respectively), this model is marketed as the "Novo Gol". However, it is no longer based on the BX platform, but shares Volkswagen's PQ24 platform with the Fox and Polo, with some components from the PQ25 platform.

In Brazil, it was released in three and five-door hatchback version with the options of 1.0-liter or 1.6-liter flex engines. Its dimensions are 3.90 m in length, 1.66 m in width, 1.45 m in height with a wheelbase of 2.47 m, and luggage capacity of 285 liters. It is the first Gol to be offered with an automated manual transmission.

Volkswagen High Torque (VHT) technology was introduced on the third generation Gol family. This new technology allows the flex engine to get the high torques at lower revs, the engines produce higher torques and horsepower on ethanol fuel.

=== Voyage ===
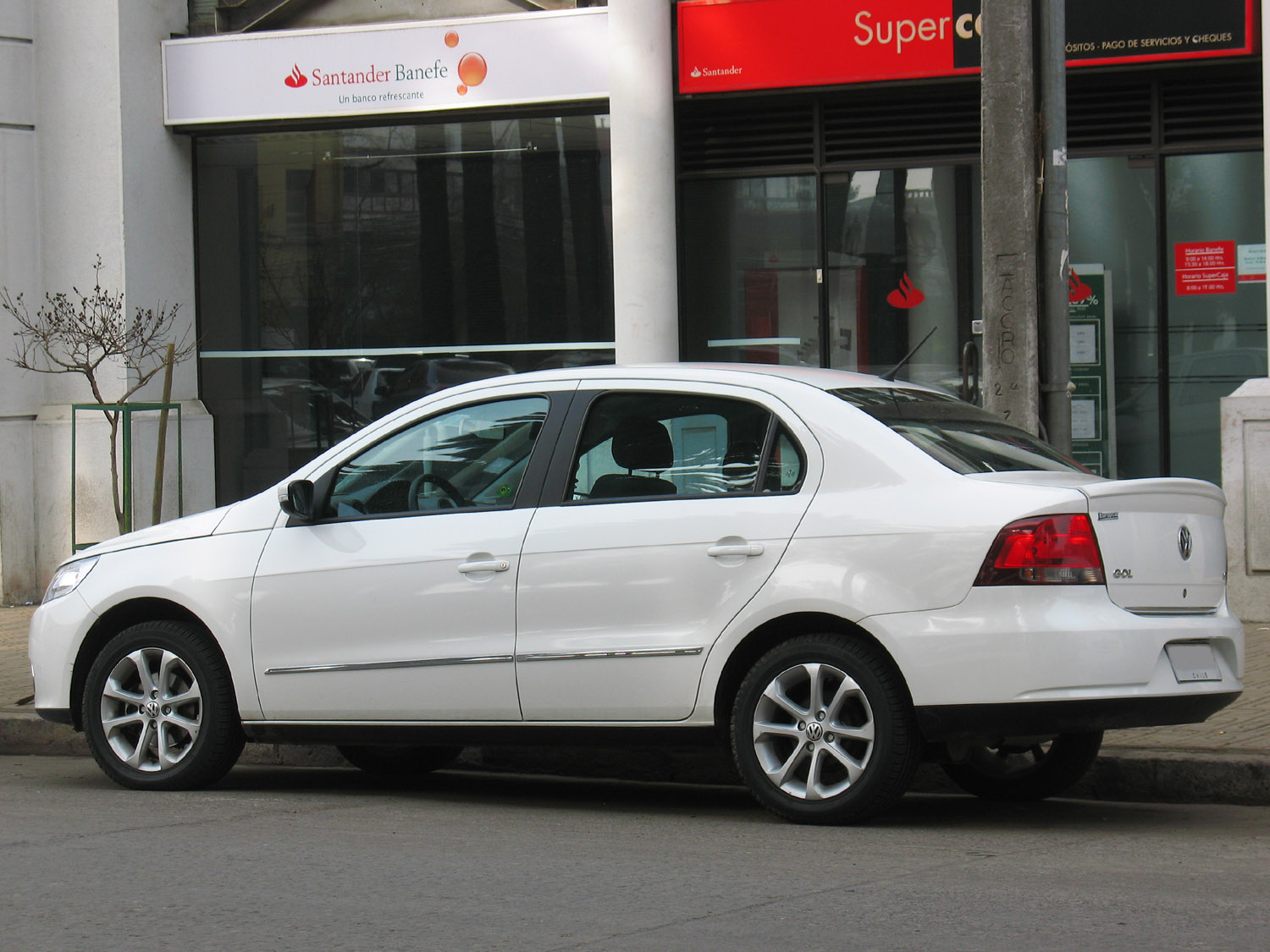
2010 Volkswagen Gol Sedan (Chile)

Revealed in September 2008, the Voyage is the sedan variant of the current Gol and as such has the same running gear 1.0 and 1.6 liter VHT ethanol compatible engines. In several countries, the Voyage is called the Gol Sedan.

The Voyage is available in four versions on the Brazilian market; 1.0, 1.6, 1.6 Trend, and 1.6 Comfortline, all with standard with ABS brakes and dual front airbags.

The Voyage's trunk can be electronically operated via a button on the dash or by pressing the keypad; the luggage capacity is 480 liters.

Production of the sedan bodystyle ended in Brazil in 1995 and resumed in 2008, so although this is only the second generation of the Voyage, it is called the G5 in line with the equivalent Gol hatchback.

=== Saveiro ===
Saveiro

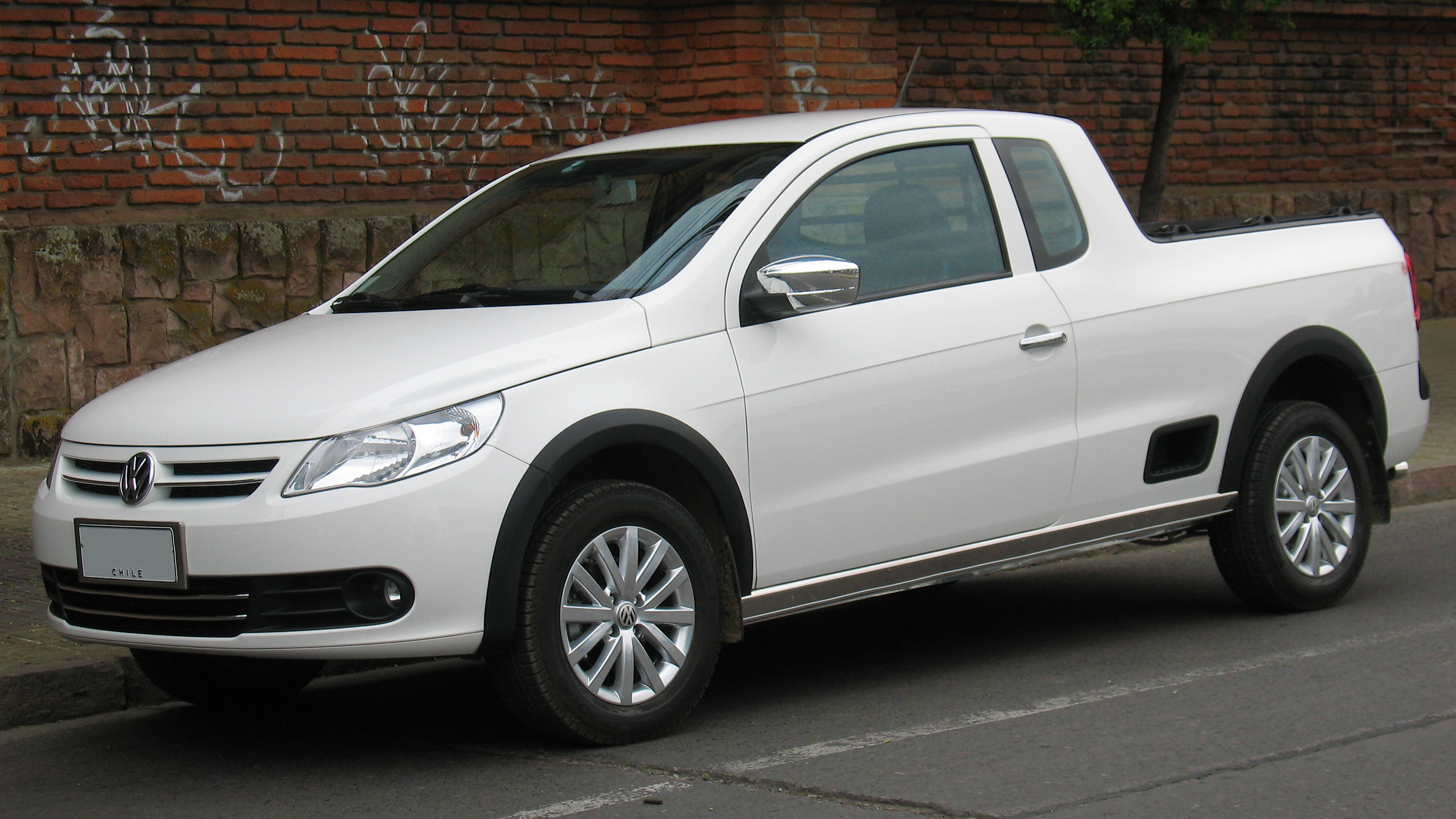
Pre-facelift

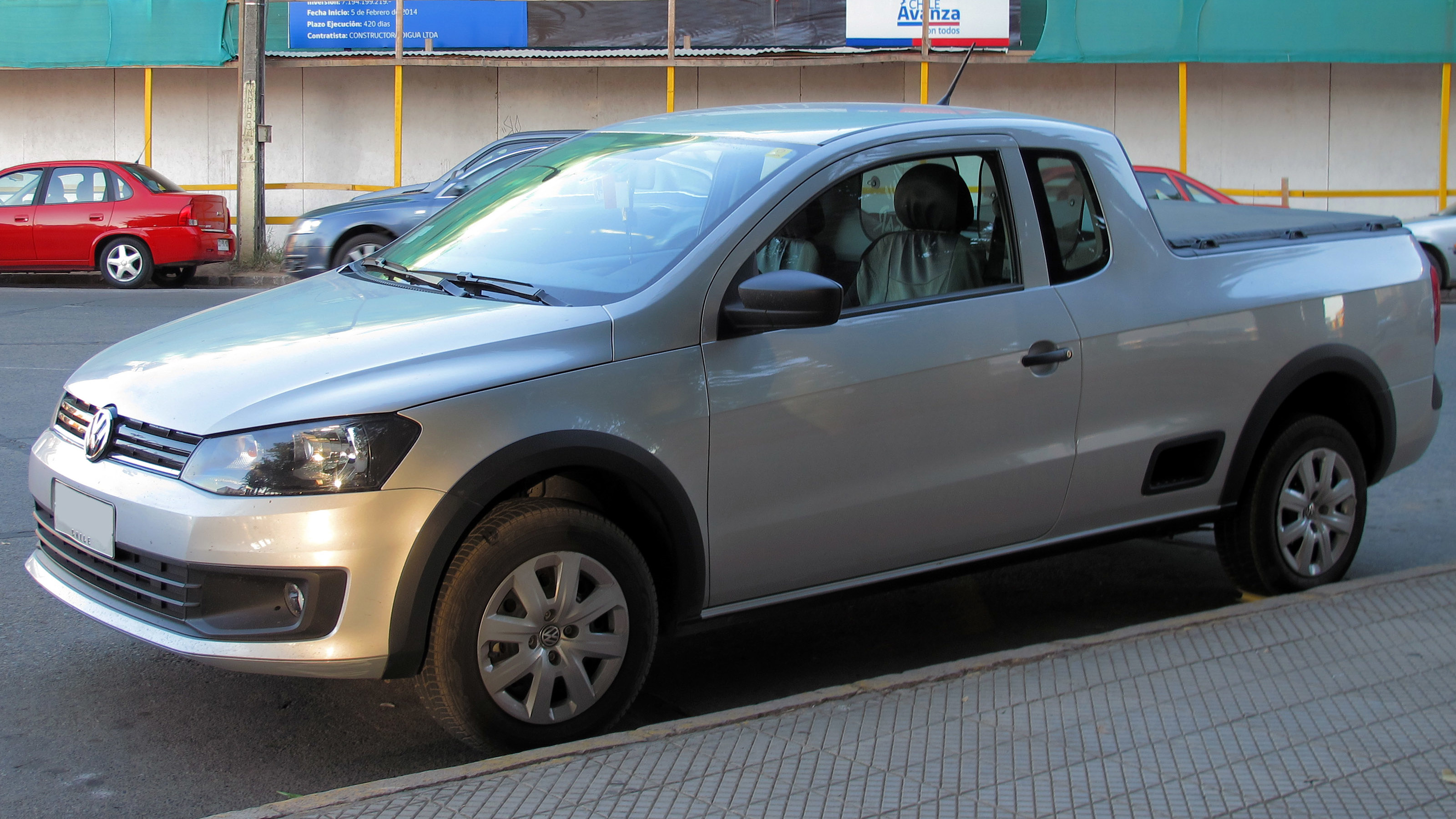
First facelift

Second facelift

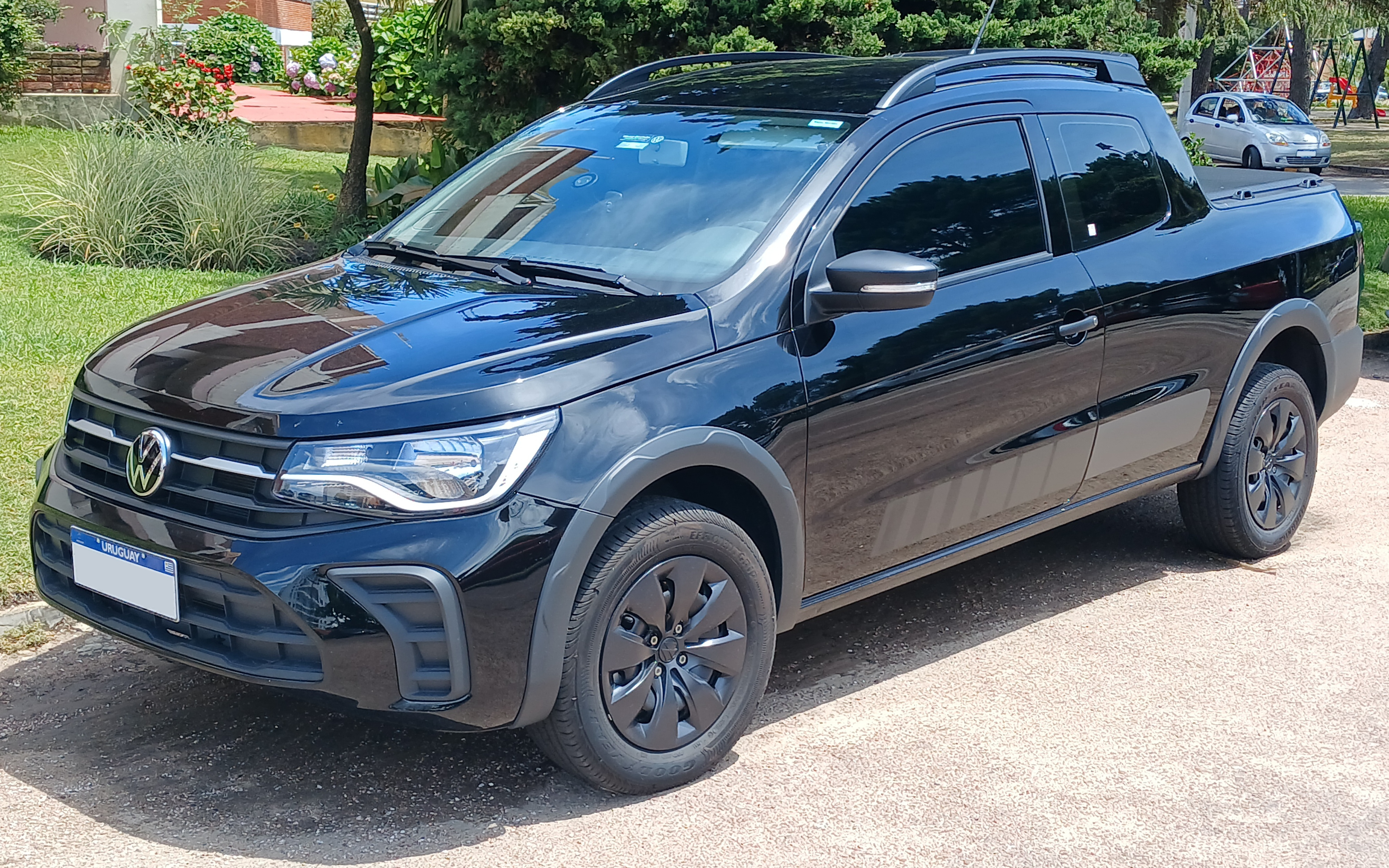
Third facelift

In August 2009, VW Brazil revealed the third generation Saveiro utility. The new Saveiro is available with a standard cabin or an extended cabin, sharing the same wheelbase which is 280 mm (11.0 in) longer than that of the Gol and Voyage. The only available engine, the 1.6L VHT, carries over from the Gol and Voyage.

The most basic 1.6 specification has black bumpers and 14-inch steel wheels. The optional Trend package includes 14-inch alloy wheels and color-coded door handle and mirror covers; the top of the line is the Saveiro Trooper which has black-painted 15-inch alloy wheels.

Carrying capacity is 715 kg (1,576 lb) for the standard cabin and 700 kg (1,543 lb) for the extended cabin.

Even after the Gol and Voyage was discontinued in Brazil, the Saveiro pickup continued to be manufactured, undergoing a slight facelift in August 2023.

=== Engine specifications ===
- 1.0 L VHT: 72 hp (53 kW) - 76 hp (56 kW) Ethanol, producing 95 N⋅m (70 lb⋅ft) - 104 N⋅m (77 lb⋅ft) Ethanol, at 3,850 rpm
- 1.0 L MPI: 75 hp (55 kW) - 82 hp (60 kW) Ethanol, producing 97 N⋅m (72 lb⋅ft) - 104 N⋅m (77 lb⋅ft) Ethanol, at 3,000 rpm
- 1.6 L VHT: 101 hp (74 kW) - 104 hp (76 kW) Ethanol, producing 154 N⋅m (114 lb⋅ft) - 156 N⋅m (115 lb⋅ft) Ethanol, at 2,500 rpm
- 1.6 L MSI: 110 hp (81 kW) - 120 hp (88 kW) Ethanol, producing 158 N⋅m (117 lb⋅ft) - 168 N⋅m (124 lb⋅ft) Ethanol, at 3,000 rpm

=== Facelifts ===
The third generation of the Gol received a facelift in 2012, with more angular headlights and taillights, similar to the sixth-generation Volkswagen Jetta.

The model received another facelift in 2016, based on the fifth-generation Volkswagen Polo and the seventh-generation Volkswagen Golf. A new 1.0 liter three-cylinder was introduced, the same engine used on the Brazilian-specification Up! and Fox models, with the option of ethanol or gasoline, or a combination of both. The Rallye version based on the CrossFox with a 16-valve 1.6 liter four-cylinder was discontinued, leaving only the 8-valve 1.6 liter engine as an option to the 1.0 liter engine. The interior received a new dashboard and steering wheel similar to the Golf, with the option of a multimedia center with the navigation system, Android Auto and Apple CarPlay and MirrorLink.

In 2018, the third generation of the Gol received the third facelift with the same front as the Gol Track. Most of the trims were discontinued, leaving only the 1.0 and 1.6, the 1.6 version is the first version available with an automatic transmission and the iMotion automated manual transmission option was removed due to reliability concerns.

In July 2018, the model received the 6-speed automatic transmission, attached to the 1.6 16v FlexFuel EA211 engine with 110/120hp.

==== First facelift (2012–2016) ====
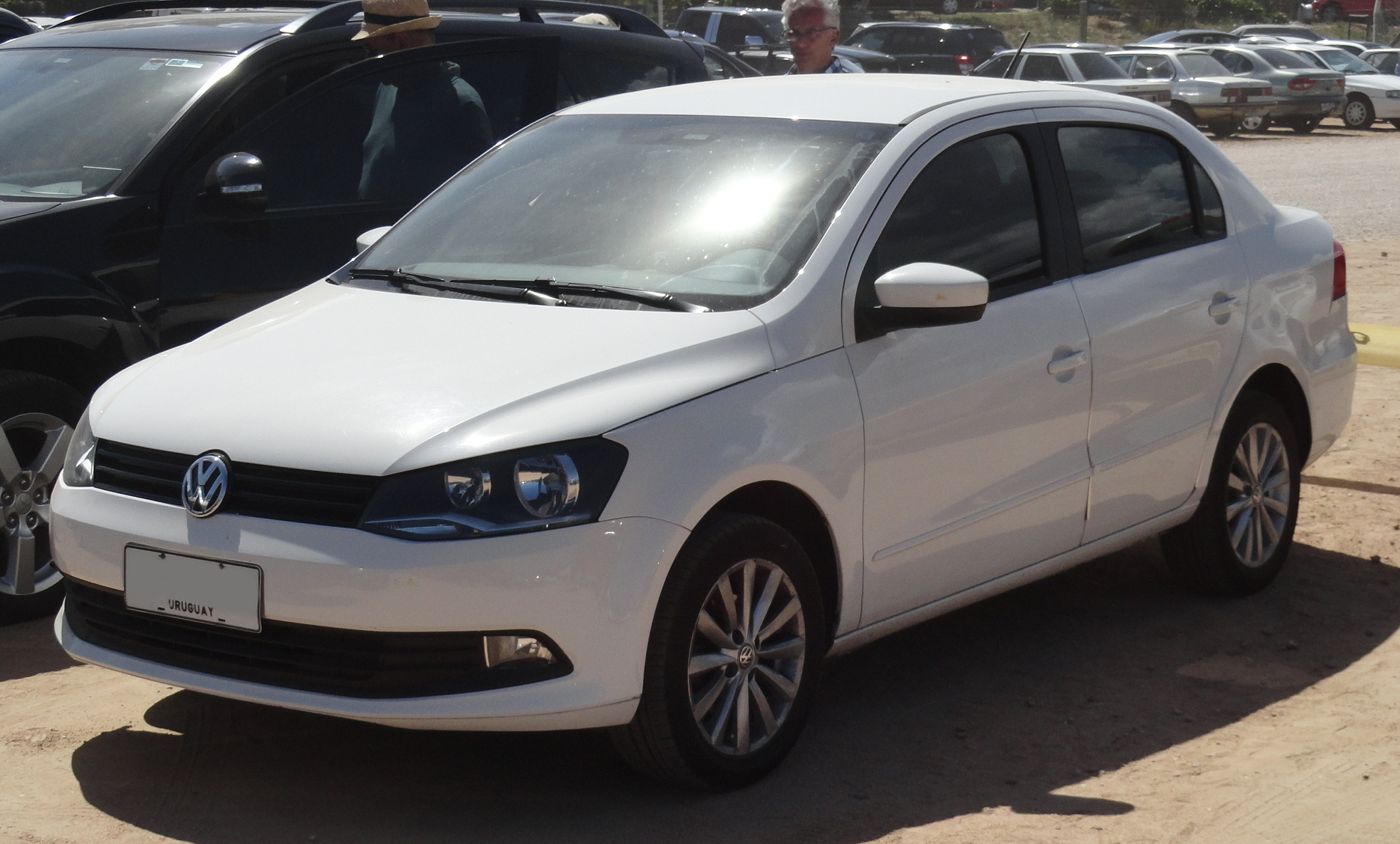
2013 VW Voyage

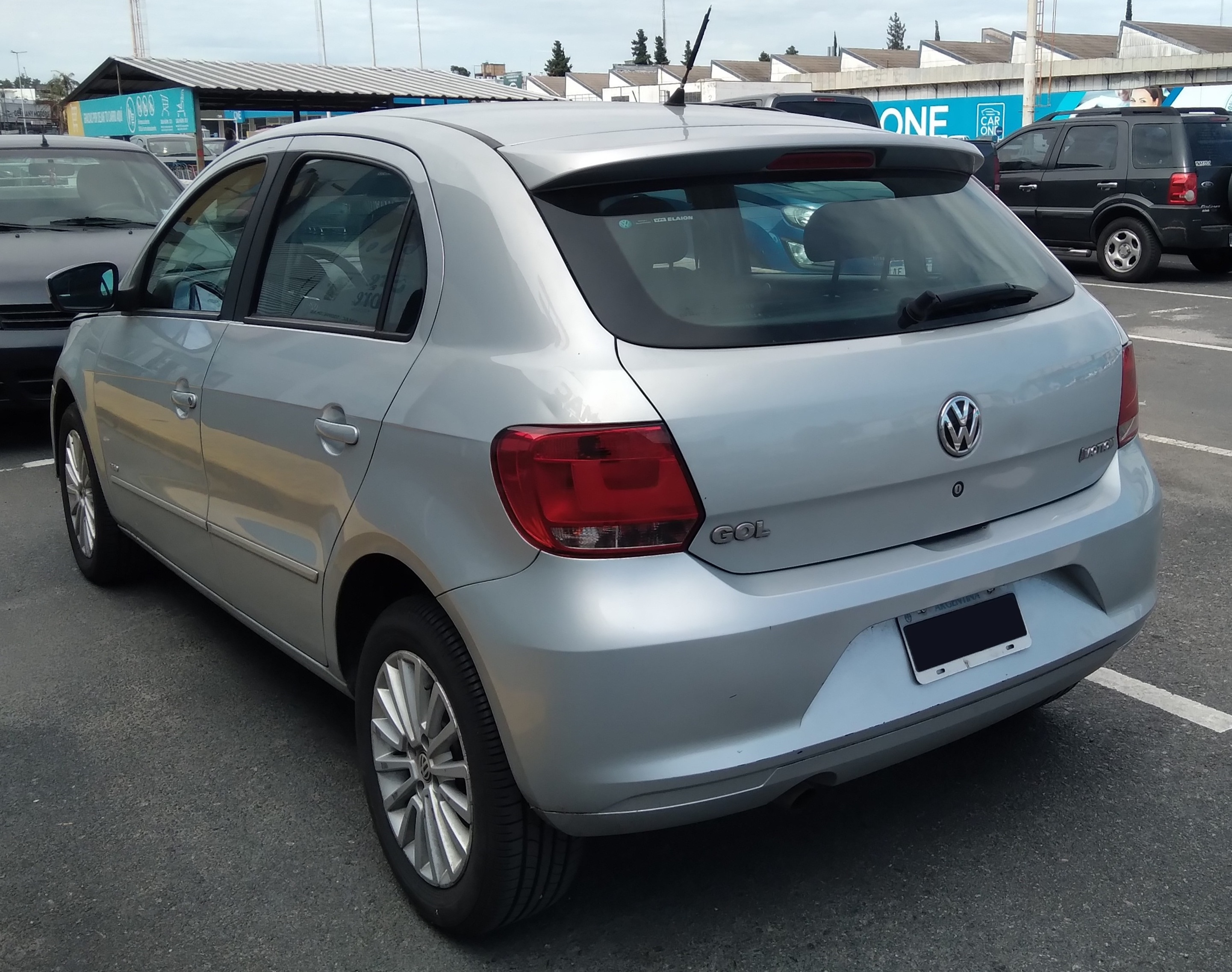
2015 VW Gol

==== Second facelift (2016–2018) ====
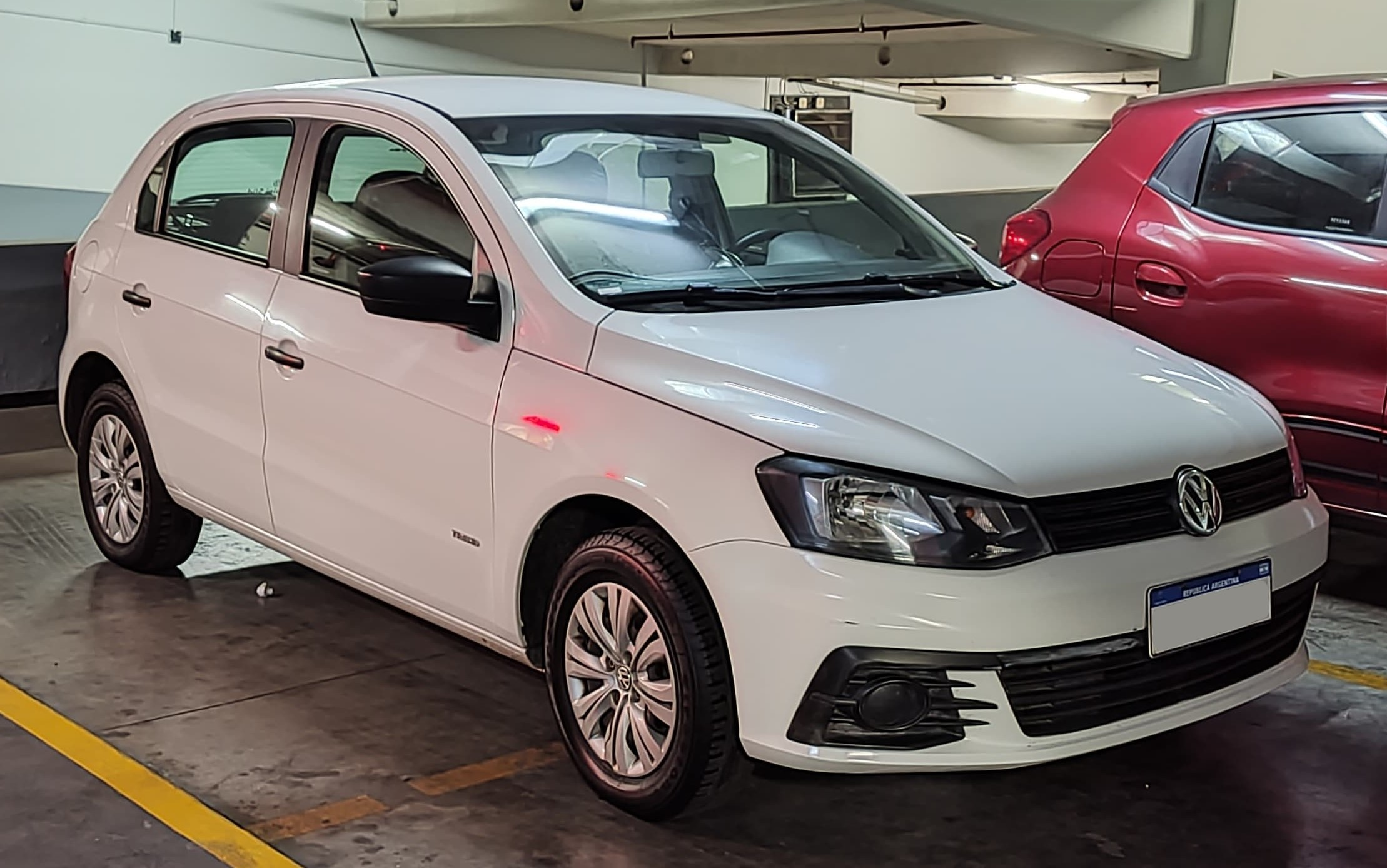
2016 VW Gol

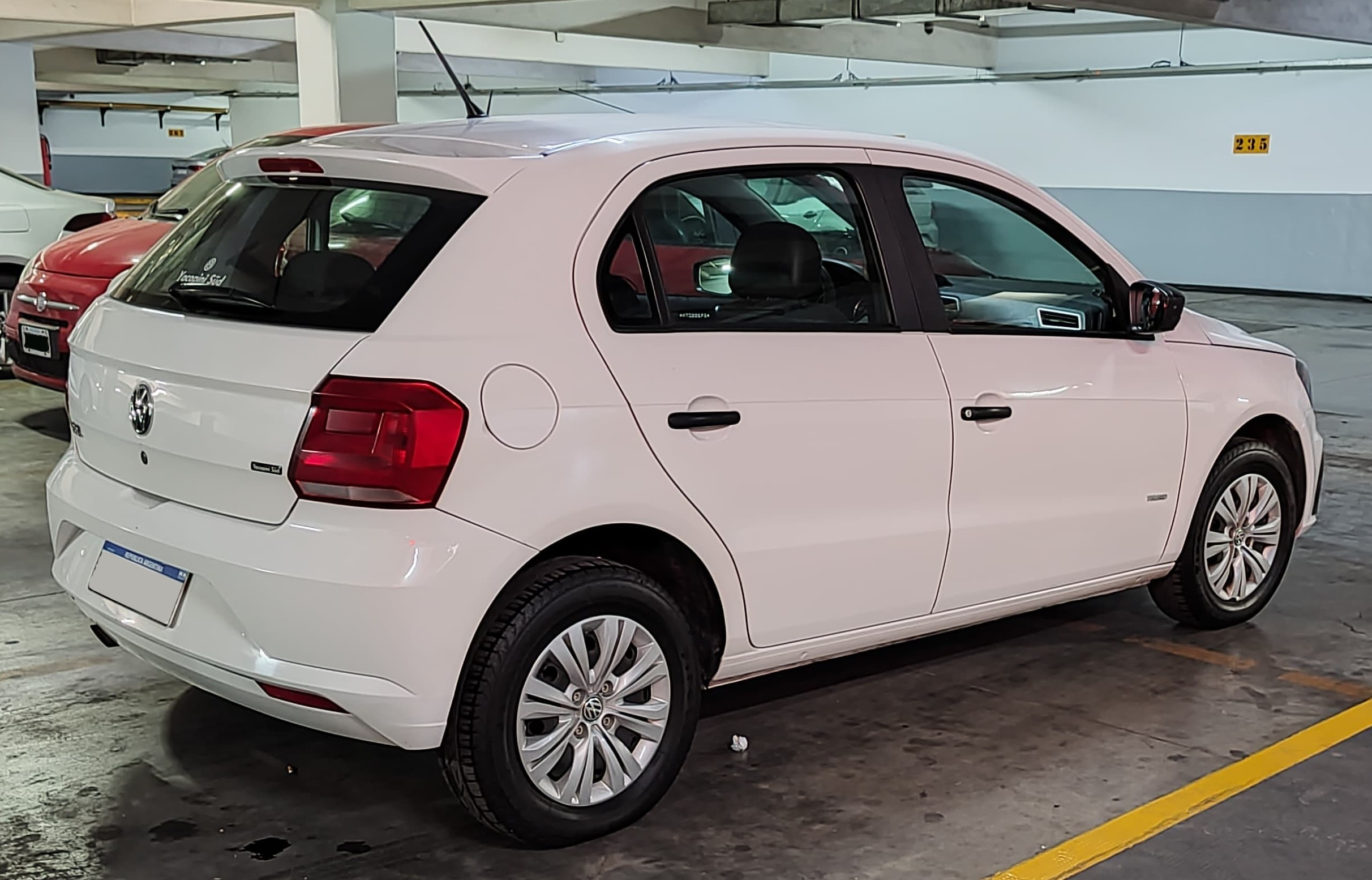
2016 VW Gol

==== Third facelift (2018–2023) ====
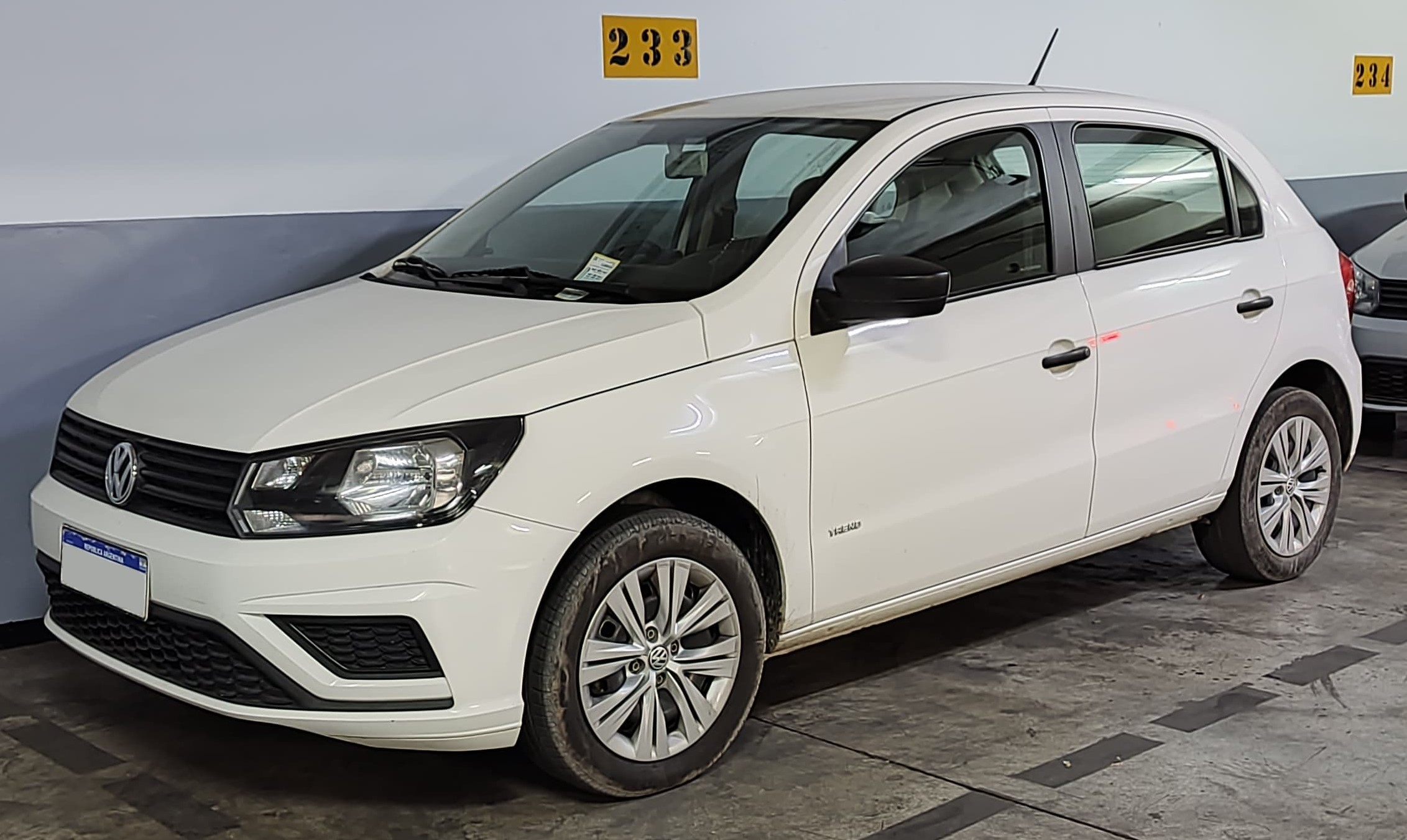
2019 VW Gol

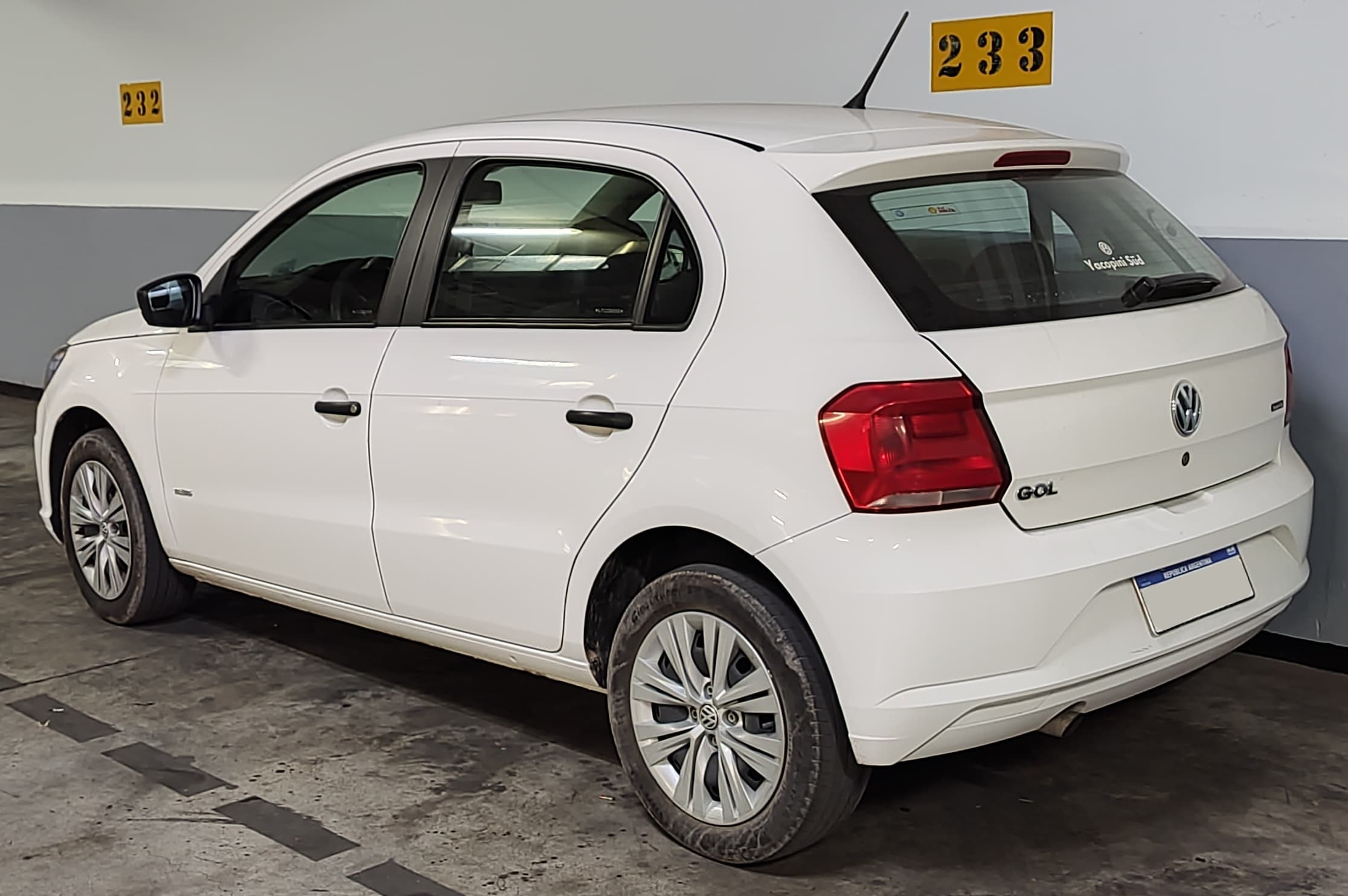
2019 VW Gol

=== Safety ===
The Gol has been rated as highly unsafe by Latin NCAP, the 2009 model in its most basic Latin American market configuration with no airbags scoring only one star for adult occupants and two stars for children. Its airbag-equipped version scored three stars. No ESP is offered, but since 2014, Brazilian law requires ABS brakes and dual front airbags in all new vehicles.

Latin NCAP 1.0 test results Volkswagen Gol Trend 1.6 + 2 Airbags (2010, based on Euro NCAP 1997)
| Test | Points | Stars |
|---|---|---|
| Adult occupant: | 10.01/17.0 | 3 /5 stars |
| Child occupant: | 21.16/49.00 | 2 /5 stars |

Latin NCAP 1.0 test results Volkswagen Gol Trend 1.6 - NO Airbags (2010, based on Euro NCAP 1997)
| Test | Points | Stars |
|---|---|---|
| Adult occupant: | 5.75/17.0 | 1 /5 stars |
| Child occupant: | 18.89/49.00 | 2 /5 stars |

Since January 2022, the Gol is banned from sale in Argentina following the entry into force of the law prohibiting the sale of new vehicles not equipped with ESP. Volkswagen has been very critical of the new law to make this active safety equipment mandatory. By refusing to equip the Gol with ESP, Volkswagen had to stop marketing the model in Argentina, even though it was the third best-selling passenger car on the local market in 2021.

== Discontinuation ==
Production of the Gol ended in late 2022. A Last Edition model for the 2023 model year with exterior upgraded was released in Brazil, with production limited to 1,000 units. It was replaced with a less equipped version of the Polo Mk6, which was introduced as the Polo Track in November 2022.

== Sales ==
| Year | Brazil | | | |
| Year | Gol | Parati | Saveiro | Voyage |
|---|---|---|---|---|
| 1995 | 287,443 | 27,129 | | 9,607 |
| 1996 | 356,724 | 34,104 | 30,300 | —N/a |
| 1997 | 361,402 | 55,011 | 32,265 | —N/a |
| 2001 | 265,898 | 24,697 | 28,831 | —N/a |
| 2002 | 208,300 | 22,393 | 22,614 | —N/a |
| 2003 | 180,659 | 12,295 | 16,097 | —N/a |
| 2004 | 177,111 | 14,942 | 17,888 | —N/a |
| 2005 | 179,457 | 12,977 | 13,963 | —N/a |
| 2006 | 189,132 | 18,665 | 18,703 | —N/a |
| 2007 | 243,164 | 17,266 | 24,398 | —N/a |
| 2008 | 285,957 | 17,767 | 30,577 | 8,944 |
| 2009 | 303,051 | 8,174 | 29,783 | 85,682 |
| 2010 | 293,614 | 7,025 | 62,190 | 82,667 |
| 2011 | 293,475 | 4,836 | 71,218 | 87,219 |
| 2012 | 293,327 | 3,454 | 66,453 | 96,403 |
| 2013 | 255,055 | 27 | 72,375 | 89,763 |
| 2014 | 183,368 | —N/a | 83,038 | 75,138 |
| 2015 | 82,372 | —N/a | 56,530 | 41,390 |
| 2016 | 60,043 | —N/a | 33,954 | 23,374 |
| 2017 | 73,922 | —N/a | 42,447 | 40,822 |
| 2018 | 77,624 | —N/a | 45,925 | 32,683 |
| 2019 | 81,290 | —N/a | 42,272 | 32,061 |
| 2020 | 71,153 | —N/a | 30,968 | 24,115 |
| 2021 | 66,234 | —N/a | 26,751 | 28,594 |
| 2022 | 72,592 | —N/a | 23,419 | 35,927 |
| 2023 | 6,176 | —N/a | 46,601 | 2,075 |
| 2024 | 53 | —N/a | 56,979 | 8 |
| 2025 | 21 | —N/a | 67,753 | —N/a |
