= Word polygon =

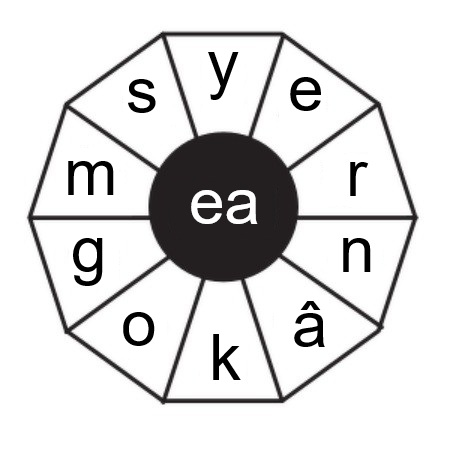
Word polygon

A word polygon is a word puzzle where the solver is presented with a grid or shape with 5 to 9 letters. The goal is to create as many words as possible using each letter no more than once. There are many variations of the rules, e.g., the minimum word length (usually 3 or 4) may vary, and it may be stipulated that specific letters must be included in any word.

== Objectives and rules ==
The objective of the puzzle is to find words which can be made using a given group of letters. Each letter may only be used once in each word. Further rules may be set. One letter may be highlighted, and all words made must include that letter. A minimum length for words may be set. There is always at least one word that can be made using all of the available letters, and the rules may require that a maximum length word be found.

With each puzzle, a number of words to aim for is usually included as a guide, with three difficulty ratings: good, very good and excellent. Each puzzle differs in its target, depending on the letters given to work with.

== Publishers ==
=== The Advertiser (Australia) ===
In Australia, The Advertiser produce a puzzle called "target". Fairfax Books have also published two Target puzzle books titled Aiming up, which comprise 75 puzzles each.

=== The Times ===
In the UK, The Times produces a daily anagram puzzle called "polygon". The minimum word length varies through the week. On Mondays and Tuesdays the Polygon has a total of seven letters, and answer words must be at least three letters in length. The total number of letters is eight on Wednesdays and Thursdays, nine on Fridays and ten on Saturdays, and answers must be at least four letters long on those days.

=== Canadian Artists Syndicate ===
Walter Feener produces a puzzle called Word Target which is distributed by the Canadian Artists Syndicate.
