= Barcham =

Barcham برچم
- Village
- Location within Iran
- Coordinates: 36°19′15″N 46°40′03″E
- Country: Iran
- Province: Kurdistan
- County: Saqqez
- Bakhsh: Ziviyeh
- Rural District: Gol Tappeh

Population (2006)
  - Total: 153
- Time zone: UTC+3:30 (IRST)
  - Summer (DST): UTC+4:30 (IRDT)

Barcham (Persian: برچم) is a village in Gol Tappeh Rural District, Ziviyeh District, Saqqez County, Kurdistan Province, Iran. At the 2006 census, its population was 153, in 31 families. The village is populated by Kurds.
