= Facundo Chapur =

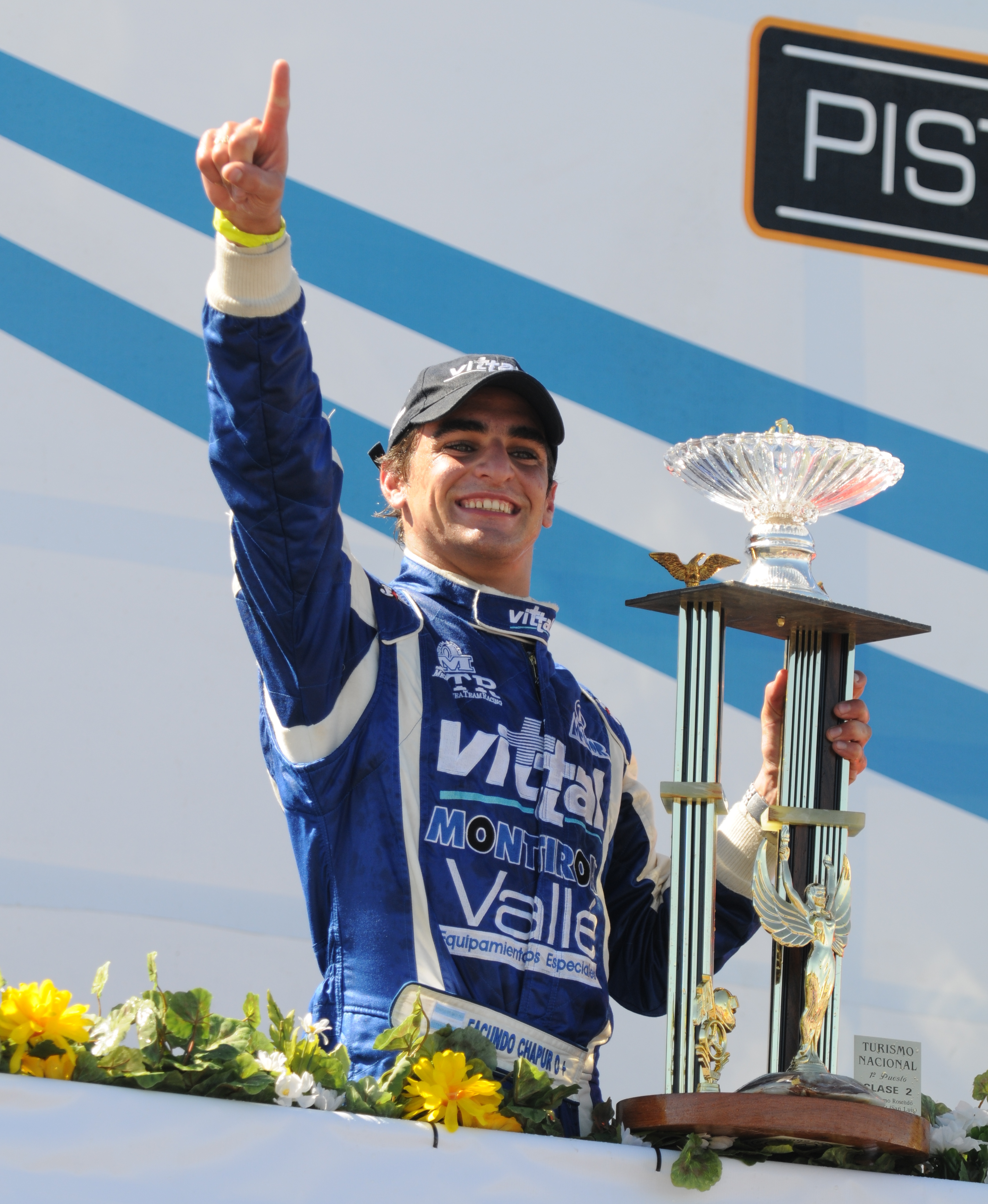
- Chapur in 2013
- Nationality: Argentine
- Born: 2 December 1993 (age 32) Córdoba, Argentina

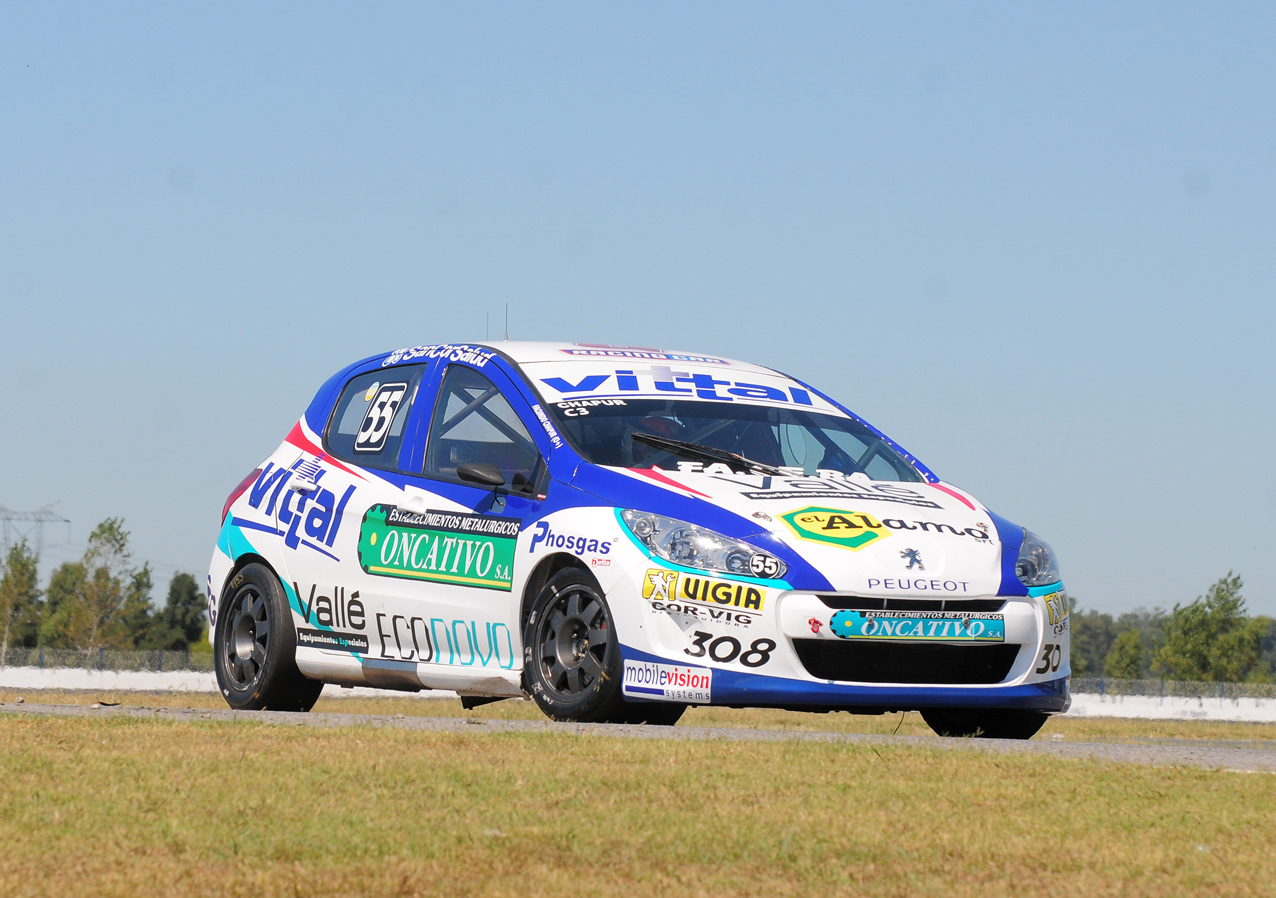
Facundo Chapur in Turismo Nacional in 2013

Facundo Chapur (Córdoba; December 2, 1993) is an Argentine motor racing driver.

== Career ==
Chapur began his racing career in 2010 in the minor division (Clase 2) of Turismo Nacional (TN) championship. He won the Clase 2 title in 2012, before moving up to Clase 3 and becoming champion in his rookie season.

As a factory driver for Peugeot Argentina, Chapur won his second title in TN Clase 3 in 2015. He also competed in Super TC2000.

In 2018 and 2019, Chapur was a driver for Citroën Argentina. In 2018, he was runner-up in TN Clase 3 and fifth in Super TC2000 championship. In 2019 and 2020, Chapur was third in TN Clase 3 with MG-C Pergamino team.

Since 2021, Chapur competes in TN Clase 3, TC Pista and TC Pick Up. As of 2024, Chapur competes in Turismo Carretera.

== Racing record ==
=== Racing career summary ===
Season	Series	Team	Races	Wins	Poles	F/Laps	Podiums	Points	Position
2010	Turismo Nacional - Clase 2	DG Motorsport	11	0	0	0	0	84	17th
2011	Turismo Nacional - Clase 2	DG Motorsport	11	2	3	3	3	185	5th
2012	Turismo Nacional - Clase 2	DG Motorsport	14	4	3	2	4	253	1st
2013	Turismo Nacional - Clase 3	Vittal G Racing Car	12	1	0	0	5	237	1st
2013	TC2000	JM Motorsport	2	0	0	0	0	10	22nd
2013	Súper TC2000	Escudería FE	11	0	0	0	4	21	19th
2014	Turismo Nacional - Clase 3	Vittal G Racing Car	12	1	3	1	3	234	2nd
2014	Súper TC2000	FE Peugeot Junior Èquipe	12	0	0	0	0	64	17th
2015	Turismo Nacional - Clase 3	Team Peugeot Total Argentina	12	1	0	1	4	246	1st
2015	Súper TC2000	Equipo Fiat Petronas	13	0	1	1	2	141,5	7th
2016	Turismo Nacional - Clase 3	Team Peugeot Total Argentina	11	0	1	1	2	139	12th
2016	Súper TC2000	Team Peugeot Total Argentina	13	0	0	0	2	83	14th
2016	TC2000	DTA	1	0	0	0	0	N/A	NC
2017	Turismo Nacional - Clase 3	Team Peugeot Total Argentina	11	1	0	0	1	108,5	16th
2017	Súper TC2000	Team Peugeot Total Argentina	14	1	0	0	2	133,5	8th
2017	TC2000	DTA Racing	1	0	0	0	0	N/A	NC
2018	Turismo Nacional - Clase 3	Citroën Total GC Racing	12	0	1	0	3	248,5	2nd
2018	Súper TC2000	Citroën Total Racing Súper TC2000 Team	14	2	2	2	4	154	5th
2018	TC2000	Citroën Total Racing Team PSG	2	0	0	0	0	N/A	NC
2018	Porsche GT3 Cup Trophy Argentina	N/A	3	0	1	0	2	54	6th
2019	Turismo Nacional - Clase 3	MG-C Pergamino	12	1	2	1	5	237	3rd
2019	Súper TC2000	Citroën Total Racing Súper TC2000 Team	11	0	0	0	0	30	11th
2019	TC2000	Citroën Total Racing Team PSG	1	0	0	0	0	N/A	NC
2019	TC Mouras	A&P Competición	3	0	0	0	1	103,75	26th
2020	Turismo Nacional - Clase 3	MG-C Pergamino	8	1	0	1	2	170	3rd
2020	TC Mouras	A&P Competición	8	1	0	1	2	277,75	3rd
2021	Turismo Nacional - Clase 3	GC Competición	12	0	1	1	1	208	6th
2021	TC Pista	A&P Competición	14	1	1	0	3	390.75	11th
2021	TC Pick Up	Alifraco Sport	11	0	0	0	0	227.5	13th
2022	Turismo Nacional - Clase 3	Crucianelli GC Competición	13	1	0	1	3	183	6th
2022	TC Pista	A&P Competición	15	3	2	2	3	451.5	4th
2022	TC Pick Up	Alifraco Sport	10	0	0	1	1	176	19th
2023	Turismo Nacional - Clase 3	Crucianelli GC Competición	11	1	0	0	3	216	6th
2023	TC Pista	A&P Competición	15	2	2	3	5	471.5	4th
2023	TC Pick Up	LCA Racing	12	1	0	0	1	328.5	10th
2024	Turismo Nacional - Clase 3	Crucianelli GC Competición							
2024	Turismo Carretera	A&P Competición							
