= Goal line =

Goal line may refer to:

== Sports field markings ==
- Goal line (association football), in soccer
- Goal line (gridiron football), in American and Canadian football
- Goal line (ice hockey)
- Goal line, the try line on a rugby league playing field
- Goal line, the try line on a rugby union playing field

== Other uses ==
- ESPN Goal Line & Bases Loaded, a college football television show
