= Targeteer (pistol) =

The Targeteer was the first air pistol that Daisy Outdoor Products created. Fred Lefever first made it in 1937, and he based it on the Colt Woodsman pistol's design.

The Targeteer was designed as a low-power BB gun for indoor target shooting. The weapon originally used a smaller-sized BB. The first models had the box designed to be folded into a backstop with a revolving target in the box.

After World War II, Daisy redesignated the weapon the Targette that now was made with a silver chrome finish. It included an attractive red plastic holder of spinning targets that was also designed to hold the pistol on top of it.

The weapon ceased production in 1952, but Daisy manufactured new Targeteer air pistols of a different design from 1957 to 1978 using standard-sized BBs.
