= Gol, Bhopal =

Gol
- village
- Location within Madhya Pradesh Location within India
- Coordinates: 23.093125°N 77.416688°E
- Country: India
- State: Madhya Pradesh
- District: Bhopal
- Tehsil: Huzur

Population (2011)
  - Total: 1,093
- Time zone: UTC+5:30 (IST)
- ISO 3166 code: MP-IN
- Census code: 482530

Gol is a village in the Bhopal district of Madhya Pradesh, India. It is located in the Huzur tehsil and the Phanda block.

== Demographics ==
According to the 2011 census of India, Gol has 212 households. The effective literacy rate (i.e. the literacy rate of population excluding children aged 6 and below) is 64.61%.

Demographics (2011 Census)
	Total	Male	Female
Population	1093	593	500
Children aged below 6 years	152	91	61
Scheduled caste	300	161	139
Scheduled tribe	112	53	59
Literates	608	374	234
Workers (all)	472	322	150
Main workers (total)	385	269	116
Main workers: Cultivators	82	72	10
Main workers: Agricultural labourers	228	133	95
Main workers: Household industry workers	3	3	0
Main workers: Other	72	61	11
Marginal workers (total)	87	53	34
Marginal workers: Cultivators	2	0	2
Marginal workers: Agricultural labourers	48	25	23
Marginal workers: Household industry workers	14	10	4
Marginal workers: Others	23	18	5
Non-workers	621	271	350
