= Target Lake =

Lake in the state of Minnesota, United States

- Location within Minnesota
- Location: Houston County, Minnesota
- Coordinates: 43°47′41″N 91°16′49″W
- Type: lake

Target Lake is a lake in Houston County, in the U.S. state of Minnesota.

Target Lake was so because an early shooting range was located near the lake.
