= Barcham Trees =

British tree-growing company

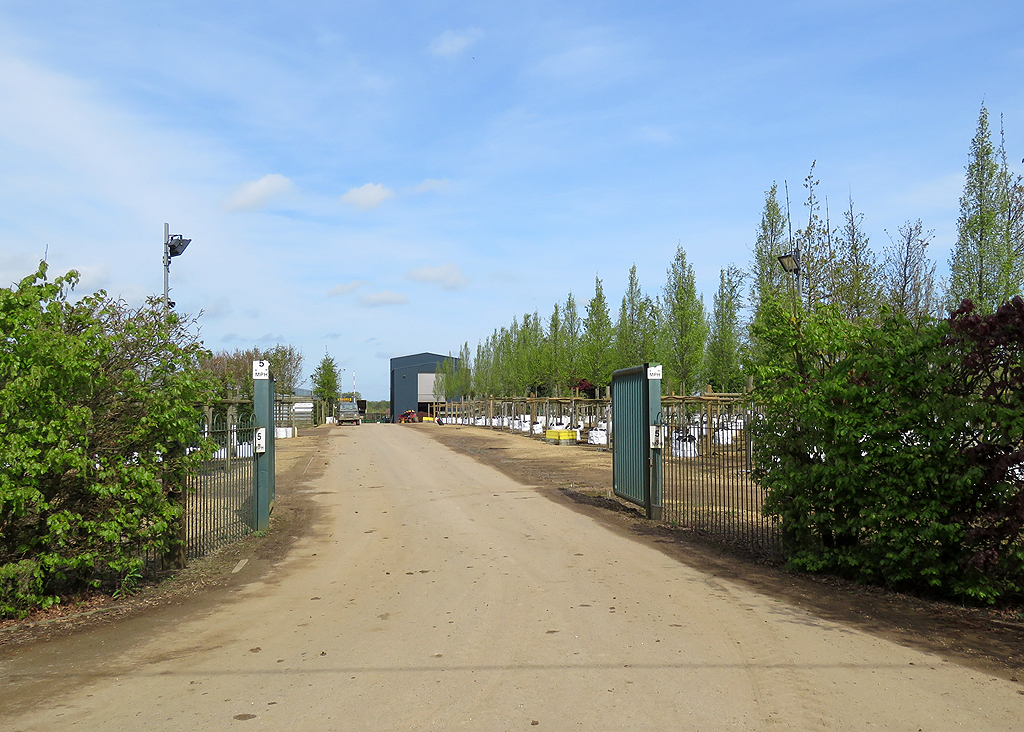
Company premises in Soham, Cambridgeshire, UK in 2018

Barcham Trees is a British forestry company based in Soham, Cambridgeshire that grows and sells live trees for installation. In 2024, it had 300 acres of land under cultivation and 225,000 trees in stock.

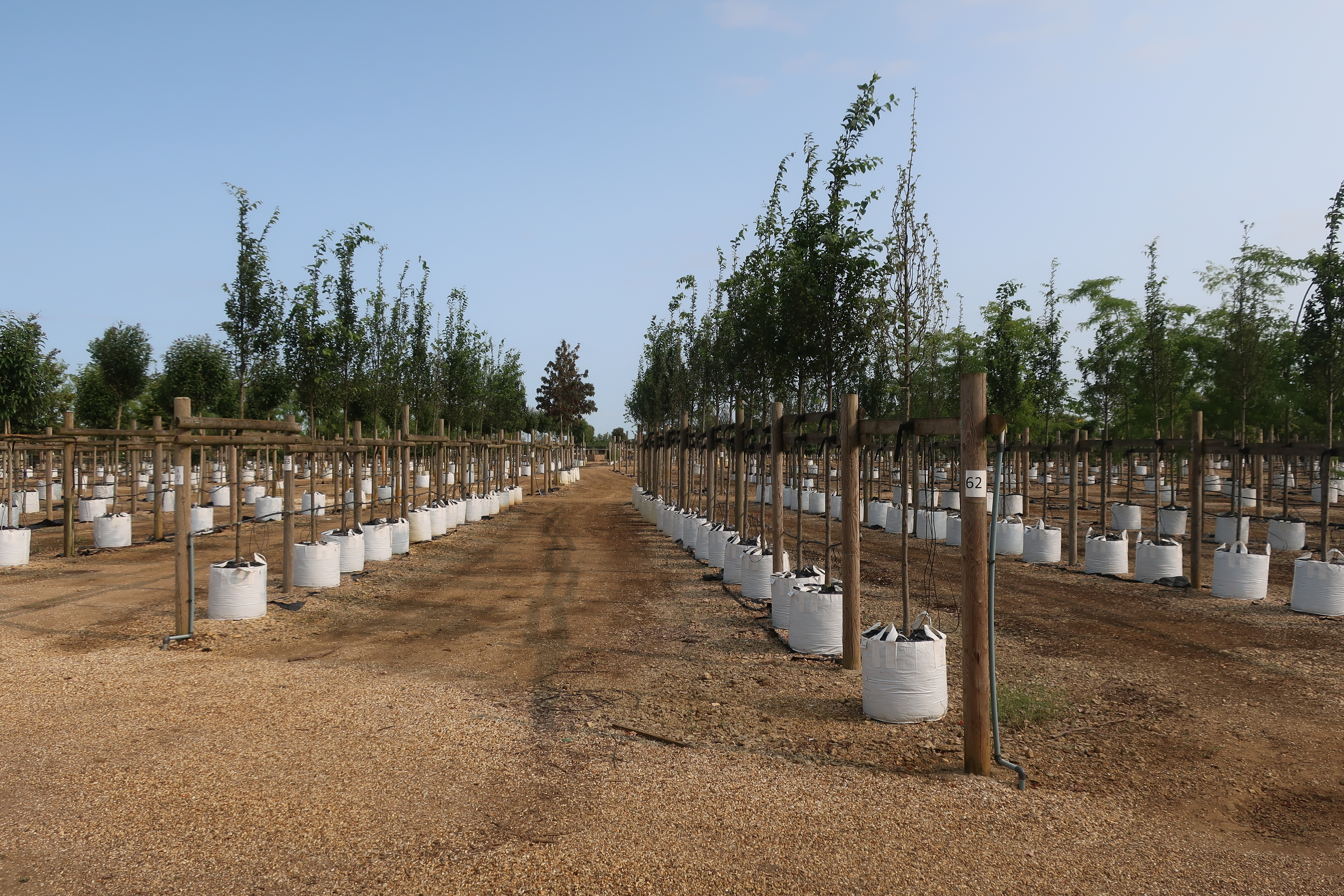
Tree nursery in Soham in 2024

The company received a royal warrant in 2014 due to supplying trees to Sandringham and Balmoral, which was renewed by Charles III in 2024.
