= Human Target (disambiguation) =

Human Target is a detective comic book character associated with DC Comics.

Human Target may also refer to:

== Film and television ==
- Human Target (film), a 1974 Australian film
- Human Target (1992 TV series), on the American Broadcasting Company, based loosely on the comic book character
- Human Target (2010 TV series), on the Fox Broadcasting Company, based loosely on the comic book character
- Human Target (Arrowverse), a fictional character appearing in the Arrowverse television franchise
- "Human Target (Arrow episode)", an episode of Arrow

== Music ==
- Human Target (album), a 2019 album by the Australian band Thy Art Is Murder
- "Human Target", a song by American death metal band Six Feet Under on the album Haunted

== Other uses ==
- Human Target (Vertigo), a comic series based on the comic book character
