= Gole (surname) =

Gole is a surname. Notable people with the surname include:

- Pierre Gole (1620-84), Dutch-French ébéniste
- Aniruddha M. Gole (21st century), an Indian Canadian engineering professor
- Fereydun Gole (1942–2005), Iranian screenwriter, film director, and film editor
- Padma Gole (1913–1998), Indian poet

== See also ==
- Gore (surname)
