= Gol, Chaldoran =

Gol گل
- Village
- Location within Iran
- Coordinates: 39°12′30″N 44°14′41″E
- Country: Iran
- Province: West Azerbaijan
- County: Chaldoran
- Bakhsh: Dashtaki
- Rural District: Avajiq-e Jonubi

Population (2006)
  - Total: 100
- Time zone: UTC+3:30 (IRST)
  - Summer (DST): UTC+4:30 (IRDT)

Gol (Persian: گل) is a village in Avajiq-e Jonubi Rural District, Dashtaki District, Chaldoran County, West Azerbaijan Province, Iran. At the 2006 census, its population was 100, in 15 families.
