= Gol, Gilan =

Gol گل
- Village
- Location within Iran
- Coordinates: 37°59′42″N 48°47′44″E
- Country: Iran
- Province: Gilan
- County: Talesh
- Bakhsh: Kargan Rud
- Rural District: Lisar

Population (2016)
  - Total: 82
- Time zone: UTC+3:30 (IRST)

Gol (Persian: گل; also known as Barchaman Gol) is a village in Lisar Rural District, Kargan Rud District, Talesh County, Gilan Province, Iran.

At the 2006 census, its population was 74, in 17 families. The following census in 2011 reported no household resides in the village. The 2016 census measured the population of the village as 82 people in 32 households.
