= 2024 El Calafate Turismo Carretera round =

(Argentina) 2024 El Calafate Turismo Carretera round
Event Information
- Round 1 of 15 in the 2024
- Date: 23–25 February 2024
- Location: El Calafate, Santa Cruz, Argentina
- Venue: Autódromo Enrique Freile

Results
Race 1
Distance	5 laps	19 km
Winner	(Argentina) Mariano Werner; Werner Competición	6:46.603
Race 2
Distance	5 laps	19 km
Winner	(Argentina) Facundo Ardusso; RUS Med Team	6:43.817
Race 3
Distance	5 laps	19 km
Winner	(Argentina) Otto Fritzler; Pradecon Racing	6:43.995
Race 4
Distance	25 laps	95 km
Pole position	(Argentina) Mariano Werner; Werner Competición	1:20.458
Winner	(Argentina) Tobías Martínez; Trotta Racing Team	40:24.132

The 2024 El Calafate Turismo Carretera round (commercially titled Gran Premio Shell Helix) was a motor race for Turismo Carretera held on the weekend of 23–25 February 2024. The event was held at the Autódromo Enrique Freile in El Calafate, Argentina and consisted of four races – three 'heats' of 19 kilometres, and a 'final' of 95 kilometres. It was the opening round of fifteen in the 2024 Turismo Carretera championship.

== Background ==
The event was notable as the debut of the series' five new models. Having almost exclusively run versions of the Chevrolet Coupé SS, Dodge GTX, Ford Falcon and Torino Cherokee for the last 50 years, as well as the Toyota Camry from 2022, versions of the Chevrolet Camaro, Dodge Challenger and Ford Mustang were admitted to the grid, along with a facelifted Camry and a 'concept' Torino.

43 competitors were entered in the event, however Martín Vázquez withdrew. Ten of the entries were new models – three Camaros and Mustangs apiece, two facelifted Camry models, one Challenger and one new Torino.

== Results ==
=== Qualifying ===
Juan Cruz Benvenuti crashed in practice and withdrew from the remainder of the weekend.

Pos.	No.	Driver	Team	Car	Time/Gap	Pts
1	1	(Argentina) Mariano Werner	Werner Competición	Ford Mustang	1:20.458	2
2	83	(Argentina) Facundo Ardusso	RUS Med Team	Chevrolet Coupé SS	+0.010	
3	21	(Argentina) Otto Fritzler	Pradecon Racing	Dodge GTX Cherokee	+0.077	
4	68	(Argentina) Julián Santero	LCA Racing	Ford Falcon	+0.111	
5	79	(Argentina) Facundo Chapur	AyP Competición	Dodge GTX Cherokee	+0.126	
6	7	(Uruguay) Marcos Landa	Trotta Racing Team	Torino Cherokee	+0.187	
7	19	(Argentina) Diego Ciantini	JP Carrera	Chevrolet Coupé SS	+0.279	
8	22	(Argentina) Juan José Ebarlín	LRD Performance	Chevrolet Coupé SS	+0.408	
9	127	(Argentina) Marcelo Agrelo	Maquin Parts Racing	Dodge GTX Cherokee	+0.458	
10	3	(Argentina) Germán Todino	Maquin Parts Racing	Ford Falcon	+0.494	
11	197	(Argentina) Marcos Quijada	UR Racing	Chevrolet Camaro	+0.503	
12	13	(Argentina) Juan Tomas Catalán Magni	CM Motorsport	Ford Falcon	+0.520	
13	161	(Argentina) Kevin Candela	Candela Competición	Torino Cherokee	+0.594	
14	107	(Argentina) Tobías Martínez	Trotta Racing Team	Torino TC 2024	+0.623	
15	10	(Argentina) Valentín Aguirre	JP Carrera	Chevrolet Coupé SS	+0.629	
16	4	(Argentina) Jonatan Castellano	Castellano Power Team	Dodge GTX Cherokee	+0.659	
17	122	(Argentina) Andrés Jakos	Toyota Gazoo Racing Argentina	Toyota Camry 2024	+0.683	
18	11	(Argentina) Christian Ledesma	Pradecon Racing	Chevrolet Camaro	+0.684	
19	177	(Argentina) Ayrton Londero	Gurí Martínez Competición	Dodge GTX Cherokee	+0.712	
20	63	(Argentina) Nicolás Bonelli	RUS Med Team	Ford Falcon	+0.728	
21	88	(Argentina) Nicolás Trosset	UR Racing	Ford Mustang	+0.774	
22	121	(Argentina) Elio Craparo	Hermanos Álvarez Competición	Dodge GTX Cherokee	+0.803	
23	172	(Argentina) Santiago Álvarez	JP Carrera	Dodge GTX Cherokee	+0.834	
24	34	(Argentina) Emiliano Spataro	Spataro Racing	Ford Falcon	+0.890	
25	85	(Argentina) Ricardo Risatti	LRD Performance	Chevrolet Camaro	+0.894	
26	157	(Argentina) Juan Bautista de Benedictis	DTA Racing	Ford Mustang	+0.938	
27	6	(Uruguay) Mauricio Lambiris	Maquin Parts Racing	Ford Falcon	+0.948	
28	95	(Argentina) Agustín Martínez	Gurí Martínez Competición	Ford Falcon	+0.970	
29	231	(Argentina) José Manuel Urcera	Moriatis Competición	Ford Falcon	+1.034	
30	53	(Argentina) Federico Iribarne	Alifraco Sport	Chevrolet Coupé SS	+1.218	
31	77	(Argentina) Augusto Carinelli	Fancio Competición	Dodge GTX Cherokee	+1.329	
32	9	(Argentina) Juan Martín Trucco	Di Meglio Motorsport	Dodge Challenger	+1.389	
33	38	(Argentina) Nicolás Cotignola	Sprint Racing	Torino Cherokee	+1.579	
34	94	(Argentina) Lautaro de la Iglesia	Di Meglio Motorsport	Dodge GTX Cherokee	+1.688	
35	47	(Argentina) Norberto Fontana	Hermanos Álvarez Competición	Chevrolet Coupé SS	+1.723	
36	12	(Argentina) Gastón Mazzacane	Dole Racing	Chevrolet Coupé SS	+1.772	
37	5	(Argentina) Santiago Mangoni	Las Toscas Racing	Chevrolet Coupé SS	+1.928	
38	75	(Argentina) Sergio Alaux	Giavedoni Sport	Chevrolet Coupé SS	+2.095	
39	96	(Argentina) Juan Cruz Benvenuti	Alifraco Sport	Chevrolet Coupé SS	No time	
40	71	(Argentina) Sebastián Abella	LCA Racing	Chevrolet Coupé SS	No time	
EXC	23	(Argentina) Esteban Gini	Maquin Parts Racing	Toyota Camry 2022	Excluded	
EXC	114	(Argentina) Gastón Ferrante	AyP Competición	Toyota Camry 2024	Excluded	

=== Heat 1 ===
Pos.	No.	Driver	Team	Car	Laps	Time/Retired	Grid	Pts.
1	1	(Argentina) Mariano Werner	Werner Competición	Ford Mustang	5	6:46.603	1	5
2	68	(Argentina) Julián Santero	LCA Racing	Ford Falcon	5	+0.144	2	4.5
3	19	(Argentina) Diego Ciantini	JP Carrera	Chevrolet Coupé SS	5	+1.325	3	4
4	161	(Argentina) Kevin Candela	Candela Competición	Torino Cherokee	5	+5.762	5	3.5
5	3	(Argentina) Germán Todino	Maquin Parts Racing	Ford Falcon	5	+5.763	4	3
6	4	(Argentina) Jonatan Castellano	Castellano Power Team	Dodge GTX Cherokee	5	+6.180	6	2.5
7	121	(Argentina) Elio Craparo	Hermanos Álvarez Competición	Dodge GTX Cherokee	5	+6.511	8	2
8	85	(Argentina) Ricardo Risatti	LRD Performance	Chevrolet Camaro	5	+8.671	9	1.5
9	177	(Argentina) Ayrton Londero	Gurí Martínez Competición	Dodge GTX Cherokee	5	+9.562	7	1
10	94	(Argentina) Lautaro de la Iglesia	Di Meglio Motorsport	Dodge GTX Cherokee	5	+10.560	12	0.5
11	77	(Argentina) Augusto Carinelli	Fancio Competición	Dodge GTX Cherokee	5	+11.323	11	
12	5	(Argentina) Santiago Mangoni	Las Toscas Racing	Chevrolet Coupé SS	5	+11.420	13	
13	95	(Argentina) Agustín Martínez	Gurí Martínez Competición	Ford Falcon	2	+3 laps	10	
DNS	71	(Argentina) Sebastián Abella	LCA Racing	Chevrolet Coupé SS				
Fastest Lap: Julián Santero (LCA Racing), 1:20.721

=== Heat 2 ===
Pos.	No.	Driver	Team	Car	Laps	Time/Retired	Grid	Pts.
1	83	(Argentina) Facundo Ardusso	RUS Med Team	Chevrolet Coupé SS	5	6:43.817	1	5
2	22	(Argentina) Juan José Ebarlín	LRD Performance	Chevrolet Coupé SS	5	+2.033	3	4.5
3	197	(Argentina) Marcos Quijada	UR Racing	Chevrolet Camaro	5	+3.097	4	4
4	122	(Argentina) Andrés Jakos	Toyota Gazoo Racing Argentina	Toyota Camry 2024	5	+5.071	6	3.5
5	107	(Argentina) Tobías Martínez	Trotta Racing Team	Torino TC 2024	5	+6.196	5	3
6	63	(Argentina) Nicolás Bonelli	RUS Med Team	Ford Falcon	5	+6.879	7	2.5
7	172	(Argentina) Santiago Álvarez	JP Carrera	Dodge GTX Cherokee	5	+8.828	8	2
8	23	(Argentina) Esteban Gini	Maquin Parts Racing	Toyota Camry 2022	5	+9.011	14	1.5
9	157	(Argentina) Juan Bautista de Benedictis	DTA Racing	Ford Mustang	5	+12.471	9	1
10	231	(Argentina) José Manuel Urcera	Moriatis Competición	Ford Falcon	5	+13.543	10	0.5
11	75	(Argentina) Sergio Alaux	Giavedoni Sport	Chevrolet Coupé SS	5	+19.204	13	
12	9	(Argentina) Juan Martín Trucco	Di Meglio Motorsport	Dodge Challenger	5	+20.278	11	
13	47	(Argentina) Norberto Fontana	Hermanos Álvarez Competición	Chevrolet Coupé SS	1		12	
DSQ	79	(Argentina) Facundo Chapur	AyP Competición	Dodge GTX Cherokee	5	Technical	2	
Fastest Lap: Facundo Ardusso (RUS Med Team), 1:20.575

=== Heat 3 ===
Pos.	No.	Driver	Team	Car	Laps	Time/Retired	Grid	Pts.
1	21	(Argentina) Otto Fritzler	Pradecon Racing	Dodge GTX Cherokee	5	6:43.995	1	5
2	7	(Uruguay) Marcos Landa	Trotta Racing Team	Torino Cherokee	5	+1.090	2	4.5
3	127	(Argentina) Marcelo Agrelo	Maquin Parts Racing	Dodge GTX Cherokee	5	+2.303	3	4
4	10	(Argentina) Valentín Aguirre	JP Carrera	Chevrolet Coupé SS	5	+4.283	5	3.5
5	11	(Argentina) Christian Ledesma	Pradecon Racing	Chevrolet Camaro	5	+5.291	6	3
6	13	(Argentina) Juan Tomas Catalán Magni	CM Motorsport	Ford Falcon	5	+9.324	4	2.5
7	88	(Argentina) Nicolás Trosset	UR Racing	Ford Mustang	5	+11.962	7	2
8	34	(Argentina) Emiliano Spataro	Spataro Racing	Ford Falcon	5	+11.963^{1}	8	1.5
9	114	(Argentina) Gastón Ferrante	AyP Competición	Toyota Camry 2024	5	+16.321	14	1
10	53	(Argentina) Federico Iribarne	Alifraco Sport	Chevrolet Coupé SS	5	+17.381	10	0.5
11	12	(Argentina) Gastón Mazzacane	Dole Racing	Chevrolet Coupé SS	5	+18.036	12	
12	6	(Uruguay) Mauricio Lambiris	Maquin Parts Racing	Ford Falcon	5	+35.990	9	
13	38	(Argentina) Nicolás Cotignola	Sprint Racing	Torino Cherokee	5	+35.991^{2}	11	
DNS	96	(Argentina) Juan Cruz Benvenuti	Alifraco Sport	Chevrolet Coupé SS				
Fastest Lap: Otto Fritzler (Pradecon Racing), 1:20.500

- ^1 – Emiliano Spataro was given a five-second post-race penalty for colliding with Nicolás Trosset.
- ^2 – Nicolás Cotignola was given a ten-second post-race penalty for colliding with Mauricio Lambiris.

=== Final ===
The first race of Turismo Carretera's new era was filled with chaos and controversy. Facundo Ardusso led the pack from the start, whilst Nicolás Bonelli spun out in front of the pack at the first corner. At the end of the first lap, Juan José Ebarlín spun out Marcelo Agrelo, causing a chain-reaction crash that included Andrés Jakos, Christian Ledesma, Juan Tomás Catalán Magni, Kevin Candela and Valentín Aguirre, resulting in a safety car period and Ebarlín's post-race disqualification. On the restart, Ardusso and Otto Fritzler lightly clashed wheels at the opening corner – however Ardusso later backed off with a slow puncture, resulting in a five-second penalty for Fritzler. Mariano Werner then inherited the lead in his new Mustang, but "the Fox of Paraná" spun out four laps later and was stationary for just long enough to cause a safety car. Marcos Landa in the older model Torino claimed the lead, and maintained a comfortable gap to Diego Ciantini (who passed Ebarlín for second) before a safety car came out with three laps to go as Jakos pulled off the circuit with mechanical issues. A one-lap shootout would determine the winner between Landa and Ciantini, and with three corners remaining Ciantini unloaded Landa in front of the pack – dropping the Uruguayan outside the top ten. Ciantini crossed the line first followed by Ebarlín and Fritzler, but Ciantini would receive a post-race penalty for the contact with Landa, leaving fourth-placed rookie Facundo Chapur victorious after the additional sanctions for Ebarlín and Fritzler – until he too was disqualified an hour after the race for breaching the engine compression limit, leaving fellow rookie and reigning TC Pista champion Tobías Martínez in the brand new Torino TC 2024 – built in 50 days and untested – as the winner having been originally classified fifth.

Pos.	No.	Driver	Team	Car	Laps	Time/Retired	Pts.
1	107	(Argentina) Tobías Martínez	Trotta Racing Team	Torino TC 2024	25	40:24.132	40
2	23	(Argentina) Esteban Gini	Maquin Parts Racing	Toyota Camry 2022	25	+0.256	37
3	231	(Argentina) José Manuel Urcera	Moriatis Competición	Ford Falcon	25	+0.498	34
4	68	(Argentina) Julián Santero	LCA Racing	Ford Falcon	25	+0.987	31
5	6	(Uruguay) Mauricio Lambiris	Maquin Parts Racing	Ford Falcon	25	+1.603	30
6	85	(Argentina) Ricardo Risatti	LRD Performance	Chevrolet Camaro	25	+1.852	29
7	121	(Argentina) Elio Craparo	Hermanos Álvarez Competición	Dodge GTX Cherokee	25	+2.235	28
8	172	(Argentina) Santiago Álvarez	JP Carrera	Dodge GTX Cherokee	25	+2.647	27
9	95	(Argentina) Agustín Martínez	Gurí Martínez Competición	Ford Falcon	25	+2.832	26
10	94	(Argentina) Lautaro de la Iglesia	Di Meglio Motorsport	Dodge GTX Cherokee	25	+2.948	25
11	21	(Argentina) Otto Fritzler	Pradecon Racing	Dodge GTX Cherokee	25	+4.098^{1}	24
12	63	(Argentina) Nicolás Bonelli	RUS Med Team	Ford Falcon	25	+4.505	23
13	7	(Uruguay) Marcos Landa	Trotta Racing Team	Torino Cherokee	25	+6.321	22
14	19	(Argentina) Diego Ciantini	JP Carrera	Chevrolet Coupé SS	25	+6.322^{2}	21
15	157	(Argentina) Juan Bautista de Benedictis	DTA Racing	Ford Mustang	25	+6.626	20
16	1	(Argentina) Mariano Werner	Werner Competición	Ford Mustang	25	+10.156	19
17	177	(Argentina) Ayrton Londero	Gurí Martínez Competición	Dodge GTX Cherokee	25	+12.127	18
18	38	(Argentina) Nicolás Cotignola	Sprint Racing	Torino Cherokee	25	+14.064	17
19	5	(Argentina) Santiago Mangoni	Las Toscas Racing	Chevrolet Coupé SS	25	+14.517	16
20	88	(Argentina) Nicolás Trosset	UR Racing	Ford Mustang	25	+14.958	15
21	34	(Argentina) Emiliano Spataro	Spataro Racing	Ford Falcon	25	+14.959	14
22	12	(Argentina) Gastón Mazzacane	Dole Racing	Chevrolet Coupé SS	25	+17.995	13
23	77	(Argentina) Augusto Carinelli	Fancio Competición	Dodge GTX Cherokee	25	+18.334	12
24	83	(Argentina) Facundo Ardusso	RUS Med Team	Chevrolet Coupé SS	25	+18.978	11
25	4	(Argentina) Jonatan Castellano	Castellano Power Team	Dodge GTX Cherokee	25	+19.372	10
26	3	(Argentina) Germán Todino	Maquin Parts Racing	Ford Falcon	25	+22.812	9
27	114	(Argentina) Gastón Ferrante	AyP Competición	Toyota Camry 2024	24	+1 lap	8
28	161	(Argentina) Kevin Candela	Candela Competición	Torino Cherokee	24	+1 lap	7
29	122	(Argentina) Andrés Jakos	Toyota Gazoo Racing Argentina	Toyota Camry 2024	21	Mechanical	6
30	53	(Argentina) Federico Iribarne	Alifraco Sport	Chevrolet Coupé SS	19		5
31	197	(Argentina) Marcos Quijada	UR Racing	Chevrolet Camaro	18		3
32	75	(Argentina) Sergio Alaux	Giavedoni Sport	Chevrolet Coupé SS	4		3
33	13	(Argentina) Juan Tomas Catalán Magni	CM Motorsport	Ford Falcon	2	Crash damage	3
34	10	(Argentina) Valentín Aguirre	JP Carrera	Chevrolet Coupé SS	1	Crash damage	3
35	127	(Argentina) Marcelo Agrelo	Maquin Parts Racing	Dodge GTX Cherokee	1	Crash damage	3
36	11	(Argentina) Christian Ledesma	Pradecon Racing	Chevrolet Camaro	1	Crash damage	3
DSQ	22	(Argentina) Juan José Ebarlín	LRD Performance	Chevrolet Coupé SS	25	Collision with Agrelo	
DSQ	79	(Argentina) Facundo Chapur	AyP Competición	Dodge GTX Cherokee	25	Technical	
DNS	9	(Argentina) Juan Martín Trucco	Di Meglio Motorsport	Dodge Challenger		Mechanical	
DNS	47	(Argentina) Norberto Fontana	Hermanos Álvarez Competición	Chevrolet Coupé SS			
WD	96	(Argentina) Juan Cruz Benvenuti	Alifraco Sport	Chevrolet Coupé SS		Practice crash	
WD	71	(Argentina) Sebastián Abella	LCA Racing	Chevrolet Coupé SS			
Fastest Lap: Jonatan Castellano (Castellano Power Team), 1:20.770
Sources:

- ^1 – Otto Fritzler was given a five-second post-race penalty for colliding with Facundo Ardusso.
- ^2 – Diego Ciantini was given a ten-second post-race penalty for colliding with Marcos Landa.

== Championship standings ==
Drivers' Championship

Pos.	Driver	Pts	Gap
1	(Argentina) Tobías Martínez	42.5	
2	(Argentina) Esteban Gini	38	-4.5
3	(Argentina) Julián Santero	35.5	-7
4	(Argentina) José Manuel Urcera	34	-8.5
5	(Argentina) Ricardo Risatti	30.5	-12.5

- Note: Only the top five positions are included.

Previous race: 2023 2nd San Juan Turismo Carretera round	Turismo Carretera; 2024 season	Next race: 2024 Viedma Turismo Carretera round
Previous race: 2023 El Calafate Turismo Carretera round	El Calafate Turismo Carretera round	Next race: 2025 El Calafate Turismo Carretera round
