= 2023 Buenos Aires Grand Prix =

(Argentina) 2023 Gran Premio de Buenos Aires
Event Information
- Round 10 of 15 in the 2023
- Date: 18–20 August 2023
- Location: Buenos Aires, Argentina
- Venue: Autódromo Oscar y Juan Gálvez
- Weather: Saturday: Rain; Sunday: Overcast

Results
Race 1
Distance	5 laps	28.255 km
Winner	(Argentina) Marcos Quijada; Uranga Racing	7:37.062
Race 2
Distance	5 laps	28.255 km
Winner	(Argentina) Santiago Álvarez; JP Carrera	7:39.016
Race 3
Distance	5 laps	28.255 km
Winner	(Argentina) Leonel Sotro; Alifraco Sport	9:55.446
Race 4
Distance	25 laps	141.275 km
Pole position	(Argentina) Marcos Quijada; Uranga Racing	1:30.361
Winner	(Argentina) Valentín Aguirre; JP Carrera	48:50.071

The 2023 Buenos Aires Grand Prix (Spanish: 2023 Gran Premio de Buenos Aires, commercially titled Gran Premio de Buenos Aires Shell) was a motor race for Turismo Carretera held on the weekend of 18–20 August 2023. The event was held at the Autódromo Oscar y Juan Gálvez in Buenos Aires, Argentina and consisted of four races – three 'heats' of 30 kilometres, and a 'final' of 140 kilometres. It was the tenth round of fifteen in the 2023 Turismo Carretera championship.

== Results ==
=== Practice ===
Session	No.	Driver	Team	Car	Time	Source
Practice 1	2	(Argentina) Mariano Werner	Memo Corse	Ford Falcon	1:32.645	
Practice 2	197	(Argentina) Marcos Quijada	Uranga Racing	Dodge GTX Cherokee	1:30.863	

=== Qualifying ===
Qualifying was affected by wet weather.

Pos.	No.	Driver	Team	Car	Time/Gap	Pts
1	197	(Argentina) Marcos Quijada	Uranga Racing	Dodge GTX Cherokee	1:30.361	2
2	172	(Argentina) Santiago Álvarez	JP Carrera	Dodge GTX Cherokee	+0.531	
3	119	(Argentina) Humberto Krujoski	SAP Team	Dodge GTX Cherokee	+0.629	
4	101	(Argentina) Lionel Ugalde	Ugalde Competición	Torino Cherokee	+1.314	
5	121	(Argentina) Elio Craparo	Hermanos Álvarez Competición	Dodge GTX Cherokee	+1.337	
6	85	(Argentina) Ricardo Risatti III	LRD Performance	Chevrolet Coupé SS	+1.515	
7	54	(Argentina) Nicolás Cotignola	Sprint Racing	Torino Cherokee	+1.552	
8	177	(Argentina) Ayrton Londero	Las Toscas Racing	Torino Cherokee	+1.568	
9	99	(Argentina) Leonel Sotro	Alifraco Sport	Ford Falcon	+1.609	
10	161	(Argentina) Kevin Candela	Candela Competición	Torino Cherokee	+1.701	
11	208	(Argentina) Gastón Ferrante	AyP Competición	Dodge GTX Cherokee	+1.717	
12	37	(Argentina) Emiliano Spataro	CM Sport	Ford Falcon	+1.788	
13	133	(Argentina) Valentín Aguirre	JP Carrera	Dodge GTX Cherokee	+1.827	
14	116	(Argentina) Alan Ruggiero	DTA Racing	Ford Falcon	+1.933	
15	137	(Argentina) Otto Fritzler	Moriatis Competición	Ford Falcon	+1.972	
16	72	(Argentina) Martín Serrano	Sportteam	Chevrolet Coupé SS	+1.993	
17	75	(Argentina) Sergio Alaux	Giavedoni Sport	Chevrolet Coupé SS	+2.059	
18	25	(Argentina) Diego Ciantini	JP Carrera	Chevrolet Coupé SS	+2.091	
19	155	(Argentina) Federico Iribarne	Alifraco Sport	Chevrolet Coupé SS	+2.292	
20	232	(Argentina) Gustavo Micheloud	Azar Motorsport	Dodge GTX Cherokee	+2.372	
21	122	(Argentina) Andrés Jakos	Toyota Gazoo Racing Argentina	Toyota Camry 2022	+2.479	
22	77	(Argentina) Augusto Carinelli	Fancio Competición	Dodge GTX Cherokee	+2.486	
23	21	(Argentina) Christian Ledesma	Las Toscas Racing	Chevrolet Coupé SS	+2.527	
24	123	(Argentina) Martín Vázquez	MV Racing	Dodge GTX Cherokee	+2.554	
25	32	(Argentina) Norberto Fontana	RUS Med Team	Torino Cherokee	+2.675	
26	83	(Argentina) Facundo Ardusso	RUS Med Team	Chevrolet Coupé SS	+2.967	
27	82	(Argentina) Carlos Okulovich	Maquin Parts Racing	Torino Cherokee	+3.003	
28	127	(Argentina) Marcelo Agrelo	Castellano Power Team	Dodge GTX Cherokee	+3.233	
29	115	(Argentina) Diego de Carlo	LRD Performance	Chevrolet Coupé SS	+3.394	
30	14	(Argentina) Juan Bautista de Benedictis	Abdala Racing	Ford Falcon	+3.699	
31	55	(Argentina) Leandro Mulet	SSB Competición	Dodge GTX Cherokee	+3.728	
32	215	(Argentina) Gastón Crusitta	SJ Racing	Dodge GTX Cherokee	+3.812	
33	44	(Argentina) Facundo Della Motta	Gurí Martínez Competición	Ford Falcon	+3.813	
34	27	(Argentina) Gastón Mazzacane	Dole Racing	Chevrolet Coupé SS	+3.943	
35	30	(Argentina) Gabriel Ponce de León	Ponce de León Racing	Ford Falcon	+4.137	
36	88	(Argentina) Nicolás Trosset	Uranga Racing	Ford Falcon	+4.259	
37	17	(Argentina) Nicolás Bonelli	RUS Med Team	Ford Falcon	+4.359	
38	20	(Argentina) Juan José Ebarlín	LRD Performance	Chevrolet Coupé SS	+4.682	
39	111	(Argentina) Juan Garbelino	MV Racing	Dodge GTX Cherokee	+4.982	
40	9	(Uruguay) Mauricio Lambiris	Alifraco Sport	Ford Falcon	+5.851	
41	87	(Argentina) Juan Martín Trucco	Di Meglio Motorsport	Dodge GTX Cherokee	+6.253	
42	95	(Uruguay) Marcos Landa	Trotta Racing Team	Torino Cherokee	+6.520	
43	56	(Argentina) Germán Todino	Maquin Parts Racing	Dodge GTX Cherokee	+8.541	
44	1	(Argentina) José Manuel Urcera	Maquin Parts Racing	Torino Cherokee	+8.588	
45	117	(Argentina) Matías Rossi	Toyota Gazoo Racing Argentina	Toyota Camry 2022	+9.140	
46	68	(Argentina) Julián Santero	LCA Racing	Ford Falcon	+9.412	
47	6	(Argentina) Leonel Pernía	Las Toscas Racing	Chevrolet Coupé SS	+9.704	
48	78	(Argentina) Agustín Canapino	JP Carrera/JHR	Chevrolet Coupé SS	+9.866	
49	53	(Argentina) Juan Tomás Catalán Magni	CM Sport	Ford Falcon	+10.811	
50	2	(Argentina) Mariano Werner	Memo Corse	Ford Falcon	+12.057	
51	7	(Argentina) Jonatan Castellano	Castellano Power Team	Dodge GTX Cherokee	+12.572	
52	4	(Argentina) Esteban Gini	Maquin Parts Racing	Toyota Camry 2022	+13.923	
53	96	(Argentina) Juan Cruz Benvenuti	Trotta Racing Team	Torino Cherokee	+22.439	
54	5	(Argentina) Santiago Mangoni	JP Carrera	Chevrolet Coupé SS	No time	

=== Heat 1 ===
Pos.	No.	Driver	Team	Car	Laps	Time/Retired	Grid	Pts.
1	197	(Argentina) Marcos Quijada	Uranga Racing	Dodge GTX Cherokee	5	7:37.062	1	5
2	101	(Argentina) Lionel Ugalde	Ugalde Competición	Torino Cherokee	5	+2.680	2	4.5
3	133	(Argentina) Valentín Aguirre	JP Carrera	Dodge GTX Cherokee	5	+9.765	5	4
4	72	(Argentina) Martín Serrano	Sportteam	Chevrolet Coupé SS	5	+14.206	6	3.5
5	77	(Argentina) Augusto Carinelli	Fancio Competición	Dodge GTX Cherokee	5	+15.310	8	3
6	9	(Uruguay) Mauricio Lambiris	Alifraco Sport	Ford Falcon	5	+15.434	14	2.5
7	155	(Argentina) Federico Iribarne	Alifraco Sport	Chevrolet Coupé SS	5	+15.982	7	2
8	17	(Argentina) Nicolás Bonelli	RUS Med Team	Ford Falcon	5	+21.787	13	1.5
9	68	(Argentina) Julián Santero	LCA Racing	Ford Falcon	5	+22.066	16	1
10	4	(Argentina) Esteban Gini	Maquin Parts Racing	Toyota Camry 2022	5	+22.488	18	0.5
11	27	(Argentina) Gastón Mazzacane	Dole Racing	Chevrolet Coupé SS	5	+24.623	12	
12	127	(Argentina) Marcelo Agrelo	Castellano Power Team	Dodge GTX Cherokee	5	+24.868	10	
13	53	(Argentina) Juan Tomás Catalán Magni	CM Sport	Ford Falcon	5	+25.451	17	
14	161	(Argentina) Kevin Candela	Candela Competición	Torino Cherokee	5	+1:00.097	4	
15	56	(Argentina) Germán Todino	Maquin Parts Racing	Dodge GTX Cherokee	5	+1:10.357	15	
16	55	(Argentina) Leandro Mulet	SSB Competición	Dodge GTX Cherokee	4	+1 lap	11	
17	54	(Argentina) Nicolás Cotignola	Sprint Racing	Torino Cherokee	2	Mechanical	3	
DNS	32	(Argentina) Norberto Fontana	RUS Med Team	Torino Cherokee		Mechanical	9	
Fastest Lap: Marcos Quijada (Uranga Racing), 1:31.018

=== Heat 2 ===
Pos.	No.	Driver	Team	Car	Laps	Time/Retired	Grid	Pts.
1	172	(Argentina) Santiago Álvarez	JP Carrera	Dodge GTX Cherokee	5	7:39.016	1	5
2	121	(Argentina) Elio Craparo	Hermanos Álvarez Competición	Dodge GTX Cherokee	5	+0.387	2	4.5
3	177	(Argentina) Ayrton Londero	Las Toscas Racing	Torino Cherokee	5	+1.195	3	4
4	208	(Argentina) Gastón Ferrante	AyP Competición	Dodge GTX Cherokee	5	+1.870	4	3.5
5	21	(Argentina) Christian Ledesma	Las Toscas Racing	Chevrolet Coupé SS	5	+3.296	8	3
6	75	(Argentina) Sergio Alaux	Giavedoni Sport	Chevrolet Coupé SS	5	+5.896	6	2.5
7	83	(Argentina) Facundo Ardusso	RUS Med Team	Chevrolet Coupé SS	5	+6.558	9	2
8	116	(Argentina) Alan Ruggiero	DTA Racing	Ford Falcon	5	+9.184	5	1.5
9	30	(Argentina) Gabriel Ponce de León	Ponce de León Racing	Ford Falcon	5	+10.988	11	1
10	6	(Argentina) Leonel Pernía	Las Toscas Racing	Chevrolet Coupé SS	5	+11.584	15	0.5
11	87	(Argentina) Juan Martín Trucco	Di Meglio Motorsport	Dodge GTX Cherokee	5	+12.574	13	
12	20	(Argentina) Juan José Ebarlín	LRD Performance	Chevrolet Coupé SS	5	+13.605	12	
13	2	(Argentina) Mariano Werner	Memo Corse	Ford Falcon	5	+13.735	16	
14	215	(Argentina) Gastón Crusitta	SJ Racing	Dodge GTX Cherokee	5	+17.780	10	
15	115	(Argentina) Diego de Carlo	LRD Performance	Chevrolet Coupé SS	5	+19.570	18	
16	96	(Argentina) Juan Cruz Benvenuti	Trotta Racing Team	Torino Cherokee	5	+19.808	17	
17	1	(Argentina) José Manuel Urcera	Maquin Parts Racing	Torino Cherokee	5	+19.937	14	
DNS	232	(Argentina) Gustavo Micheloud	Azar Motorsport	Dodge GTX Cherokee			7	
Fastest Lap: Christian Ledesma (Las Toscas Racing), 1:30.683

=== Heat 3 ===
Pos.	No.	Driver	Team	Car	Laps	Time/Retired	Grid	Pts.
1	99	(Argentina) Leonel Sotro	Alifraco Sport	Ford Falcon	5	9:55.446	3	5
2	119	(Argentina) Humberto Krujoski	SAP Team	Dodge GTX Cherokee	5	+0.913	1	4.5
3	25	(Argentina) Diego Ciantini	JP Carrera	Chevrolet Coupé SS	5	+1.288	6	4
4	37	(Argentina) Emiliano Spataro	CM Sport	Ford Falcon	5	+2.971	4	3.5
5	122	(Argentina) Andrés Jakos	Toyota Gazoo Racing Argentina	Toyota Camry 2022	5	+3.494	7	3
6	123	(Argentina) Martín Vázquez	MV Racing	Dodge GTX Cherokee	5	+4.417	8	2.5
7	14	(Argentina) Juan Bautista de Benedictis	Abdala Racing	Ford Falcon	5	+5.447	10	2
8	7	(Argentina) Jonatan Castellano	Castellano Power Team	Dodge GTX Cherokee	5	+6.228	17	1.5
9	44	(Argentina) Facundo Della Motta	Gurí Martínez Competición	Ford Falcon	5	+7.661	11	1
10	95	(Uruguay) Marcos Landa	Trotta Racing Team	Torino Cherokee	5	+10.833	14	0.5
11	117	(Argentina) Matías Rossi	Toyota Gazoo Racing Argentina	Toyota Camry 2022	5	+11.231	15	
12	5	(Argentina) Santiago Mangoni	JP Carrera	Chevrolet Coupé SS	5	+12.874	18	
13	88	(Argentina) Nicolás Trosset	Uranga Racing	Ford Falcon	5	+13.302	12	
14	82	(Argentina) Carlos Okulovich	Maquin Parts Racing	Torino Cherokee	4	+1 lap	9	
15	111	(Argentina) Juan Garbelino	MV Racing	Dodge GTX Cherokee	2	Wheel	13	
16	137	(Argentina) Otto Fritzler	Moriatis Competición	Ford Falcon	0	Crash	5	
17	85	(Argentina) Ricardo Risatti III	LRD Performance	Chevrolet Coupé SS	0	Crash	2	
DNS	78	(Argentina) Agustín Canapino	JP Carrera/JHR	Chevrolet Coupé SS		Mechanical	16	
Fastest Lap: Leonel Sotro (Alifraco Sport), 1:31.936

=== Final ===
Pos.	No.	Driver	Team	Car	Laps	Time/Retired	Grid	Pts.
1	133	(Argentina) Valentín Aguirre	JP Carrera	Dodge GTX Cherokee	25	48:50.071	8	40
2	172	(Argentina) Santiago Álvarez	JP Carrera	Dodge GTX Cherokee	25	+0.441	2	37
3	9	(Uruguay) Mauricio Lambiris	Alifraco Sport	Ford Falcon	25	+4.621	17	34
4	177	(Argentina) Ayrton Londero	Las Toscas Racing	Torino Cherokee	25	+5.148	7	31
5	101	(Argentina) Lionel Ugalde	Ugalde Competición	Torino Cherokee	25	+5.646	5	30
6	7	(Argentina) Jonatan Castellano	Castellano Power Team	Dodge GTX Cherokee	25	+6.354	24	29
7	75	(Argentina) Sergio Alaux	Giavedoni Sport	Chevrolet Coupé SS	25	+6.672	16	28
8	68	(Argentina) Julián Santero	LCA Racing	Ford Falcon	25	+7.555	26	27
9	14	(Argentina) Juan Bautista de Benedictis	Abdala Racing	Ford Falcon	25	+9.995	21	26
10	2	(Argentina) Mariano Werner	Memo Corse	Ford Falcon	25	+10.389	37	25
11	77	(Argentina) Augusto Carinelli	Fancio Competición	Dodge GTX Cherokee	25	+11.283	14	24
12	78	(Argentina) Agustín Canapino	JP Carrera/JHR	Chevrolet Coupé SS	25	+11.890	49	23
13	6	(Argentina) Leonel Pernía	Las Toscas Racing	Chevrolet Coupé SS	25	+13.135	28	22
14	96	(Argentina) Juan Cruz Benvenuti	Trotta Racing Team	Torino Cherokee	25	+13.831	44	21
15	87	(Argentina) Juan Martín Trucco	Di Meglio Motorsport	Dodge GTX Cherokee	25	+14.683	31	20
16	88	(Argentina) Nicolás Trosset	Uranga Racing	Ford Falcon	25	+15.094	39	19
17	54	(Argentina) Nicolás Cotignola	Sprint Racing	Torino Cherokee	25	+15.723	53	18
18	116	(Argentina) Alan Ruggiero	DTA Racing	Ford Falcon	25	+16.115	22	17
19	17	(Argentina) Nicolás Bonelli	RUS Med Team	Ford Falcon	25	+18.358	23	16
20	1	(Argentina) José Manuel Urcera	Maquin Parts Racing	Torino Cherokee	25	+19.051	45	15
21	55	(Argentina) Leandro Mulet	SSB Competición	Dodge GTX Cherokee	25	+19.267	47	14
22	53	(Argentina) Juan Tomás Catalán Magni	CM Sport	Ford Falcon	25	+19.627	38	13
23	111	(Argentina) Juan Garbelino	MV Racing	Dodge GTX Cherokee	25	+23.891	48	12
24	82	(Argentina) Carlos Okulovich	Maquin Parts Racing	Torino Cherokee	25	+23.892	46	11
25	27	(Argentina) Gastón Mazzacane	Dole Racing	Chevrolet Coupé SS	25	+24.687	32	10
26	208	(Argentina) Gastón Ferrante	AyP Competición	Dodge GTX Cherokee	25	+25.140	10	9
27	44	(Argentina) Facundo Della Motta	Gurí Martínez Competición	Ford Falcon	25	+39.336	27	8
28	72	(Argentina) Martín Serrano	Sportteam	Chevrolet Coupé SS	25	+1:21.404	11	7
29	117	(Argentina) Matías Rossi	Toyota Gazoo Racing Argentina	Toyota Camry 2022	25	+1:45.597	33	6
30	197	(Argentina) Marcos Quijada	Uranga Racing	Dodge GTX Cherokee	24	+1 lap	1	5
31	95	(Uruguay) Marcos Landa	Trotta Racing Team	Torino Cherokee	23	+2 laps	30	3
32	121	(Argentina) Elio Craparo	Hermanos Álvarez Competición	Dodge GTX Cherokee	23	+2 laps	4	3
33	127	(Argentina) Marcelo Agrelo	Castellano Power Team	Dodge GTX Cherokee	20	Spun out	35	3
34	119	(Argentina) Humberto Krujoski	SAP Team	Dodge GTX Cherokee	16	Crash	6	3
35	115	(Argentina) Diego de Carlo	LRD Performance	Chevrolet Coupé SS	15		42	3
36	85	(Argentina) Ricardo Risatti III	LRD Performance	Chevrolet Coupé SS	14		51	3
37	161	(Argentina) Kevin Candela	Candela Competición	Torino Cherokee	11		41	3
38	32	(Argentina) Norberto Fontana	RUS Med Team	Torino Cherokee	9		52	3
39	20	(Argentina) Juan José Ebarlín	LRD Performance	Chevrolet Coupé SS	8	Mechanical	34	3
40	215	(Argentina) Gastón Crusitta	SJ Racing	Dodge GTX Cherokee	8		40	3
41	56	(Argentina) Germán Todino	Maquin Parts Racing	Dodge GTX Cherokee	8	Mechanical	43	2
42	123	(Argentina) Martín Vázquez	MV Racing	Dodge GTX Cherokee	8		18	2
43	5	(Argentina) Santiago Mangoni	JP Carrera	Chevrolet Coupé SS	6	Mechanical	36	2
44	99	(Argentina) Leonel Sotro	Alifraco Sport	Ford Falcon	5	Brakes	3	2
45	25	(Argentina) Diego Ciantini	JP Carrera	Chevrolet Coupé SS	5	Mechanical	9	2
46	83	(Argentina) Facundo Ardusso	RUS Med Team	Chevrolet Coupé SS	2	Crash damage	19	2
47	30	(Argentina) Gabriel Ponce de León	Ponce de León Racing	Ford Falcon	2	Crash	25	2
48	21	(Argentina) Christian Ledesma	Las Toscas Racing	Chevrolet Coupé SS	0	Spun out	13	2
EXC	4	(Argentina) Esteban Gini	Maquin Parts Racing	Toyota Camry 2022	?	Overtaking under Safety Car	29	
EXC	122	(Argentina) Andrés Jakos	Toyota Gazoo Racing Argentina	Toyota Camry 2022	?	Causing a crash	15	
EXC	37	(Argentina) Emiliano Spataro	CM Sport	Ford Falcon	?	Dangerous driving	12	
EXC	155	(Argentina) Federico Iribarne	Alifraco Sport	Chevrolet Coupé SS	?	Contact with Ardusso	20	
DNS	137	(Argentina) Otto Fritzler	Moriatis Competición	Ford Falcon		Crash damage	50	
WD	232	(Argentina) Gustavo Micheloud	Azar Motorsport	Dodge GTX Cherokee		Withdrew	54	
Fastest Lap: Agustín Canapino (JP Carrera/JHR), 1:30.753

== Championship standings ==
Drivers' Championship

Pos.	Driver	Pts	Gap
1	(Argentina) Mariano Werner	281.5	
2	(Argentina) Julián Santero	270.5	-11
3	(Uruguay) Mauricio Lambiris	266	-15.5
4	(Argentina) Jonatan Castellano	259	-22.5
5	(Uruguay) Marcos Landa	230.5	-51

- Note: Only the top five positions are included.

Previous race: 2023 Desafío de las Estrellas	Turismo Carretera; 2023 season	Next race: 2023 Turismo Carretera San Luis round
Previous race: 2009 Buenos Aires Grand Prix	Buenos Aires Grand Prix	Next race: incumbent
