= 2023 Desafío de las Estrellas =

(Argentina) 2023 Desafío de las Estrellas
Event Information
- Round 9 of 15 in the 2023
- Date: 21–23 July 2023
- Location: Albardón, San Juan, Argentina
- Venue: Circuito San Juan Villicum
- Weather: Cloudy

Results
Race 1
Distance	35 laps	148.890 km
Winner	Matías Rossi; Toyota Gazoo Racing Argentina	1:09:52.136

The 2023 Desafío de las Estrellas (English: 2023 Challenge of the Stars) was a motor race for Turismo Carretera held on the weekend of 21–23 July 2023. The event was held at the Circuito San Juan Villicum in Albardón, Argentina and consisted of one race of 150 kilometres. It was the ninth round of fifteen in the 2023 Turismo Carretera championship.

The event marked the first victory for a Toyota in Turismo Carretera history, becoming only the sixth manufacturer to win a race in the series' 85-year history (after Ford, Chevrolet, Dodge-Chrysler, IKA-Torino and Volvo).

== Background ==
The event was the third and final 'special round' held in the 2023 season, the previous two being the third round in Toay and the seventh round in Rafaela. Along with Toay, the event consisted of a single race including pit-stops.

It was the seventh staging of the "Desafío de las Estrellas" event since its debut in 2015, a unique event where no qualifying session is held and the grid is instead determined by a lottery.

== Results ==
=== Practice ===
Session	No.	Driver	Team	Car	Time	Source
Practice 1	9	(Uruguay) Mauricio Lambiris	Alifraco Sport	Ford Falcon	1:41.545	
Practice 2	56	(Argentina) Germán Todino	Maquin Parts Racing	Dodge GTX Cherokee	1:41.156	

=== Race ===
Pos.	No.	Driver	Team	Car	Laps	Time/Retired	Grid	Pts.
1	117	(Argentina) Matías Rossi	Toyota Gazoo Racing Argentina	Toyota Camry 2022	35	1:09:52.136	36	40
2	122	(Argentina) Andrés Jakos	Toyota Gazoo Racing Argentina	Toyota Camry 2022	35	+0.252	22	37
3	95	(Uruguay) Marcos Landa	Trotta Racing Team	Torino Cherokee	35	+2.125	42	34
4	4	(Argentina) Esteban Gini	Maquin Parts Racing	Toyota Camry 2022	35	+6.384	29	31
5	161	(Argentina) Kevin Candela	Candela Competición	Torino Cherokee	35	+10.496	3	30
6	93	(Argentina) Matías Rodríguez	Midas Carrera Team	Torino Cherokee	35	+11.051	19	29
7	1	(Argentina) José Manuel Urcera	Maquin Parts Racing	Torino Cherokee	35	+11.707	41	28
8	56	(Argentina) Germán Todino	Maquin Parts Racing	Dodge GTX Cherokee	35	+11.960	38	27
9	54	(Argentina) Nicolás Cotignola	Sprint Racing	Torino Cherokee	35	+15.610	2	26
10	14	(Argentina) Juan Bautista de Benedictis	Abdala Racing	Ford Falcon	35	+16.399	25	25
11	7	(Argentina) Jonatan Castellano	Castellano Power Team	Dodge GTX Cherokee	35	+16.598	49	24
12	68	(Argentina) Julián Santero	LCA Racing	Ford Falcon	35	+16.780^{1}	43	23
13	44	(Argentina) Facundo Della Motta	Gurí Martínez Competición	Ford Falcon	35	+17.734	6	22
14	87	(Argentina) Juan Martín Trucco	Di Meglio Motorsport	Dodge GTX Cherokee	35	+18.028	50	21
15	9	(Uruguay) Mauricio Lambiris	Alifraco Sport	Ford Falcon	35	+18.298	37	20
16	30	(Argentina) Gabriel Ponce de León	Ponce de León Racing	Ford Falcon	35	+18.592	18	19
17	6	(Argentina) Leonel Pernía	Las Toscas Racing	Chevrolet Coupé SS	35	+18.995	23	18
18	21	(Argentina) Christian Ledesma	Las Toscas Racing	Chevrolet Coupé SS	35	+19.515	53	17
19	155	(Argentina) Federico Iribarne	Alifraco Sport	Chevrolet Coupé SS	35	+20.069	8	16
20	2	(Argentina) Mariano Werner	Memo Corse	Ford Falcon	35	+21.922	52	15
21	116	(Argentina) Alan Ruggiero	DTA Racing	Ford Falcon	35	+26.390	21	14
22	27	(Argentina) Gastón Mazzacane	Dole Racing	Chevrolet Coupé SS	35	+27.969	39	13
23	232	(Argentina) Gustavo Micheloud	Azar Motorsport	Dodge GTX Cherokee	35	+29.503	15	12
24	83	(Argentina) Facundo Ardusso	RUS Med Team	Chevrolet Coupé SS	35	+29.917	33	11
25	37	(Argentina) Emiliano Spataro	Buenos Aires Racing	Ford Falcon	35	+30.168	31	10
26	177	(Argentina) Ayrton Londero	Las Toscas Racing	Torino Cherokee	35	+30.515	35	9
27	96	(Argentina) Juan Cruz Benvenuti	Trotta Racing Team	Torino Cherokee	35	+33.738	34	8
28	127	(Argentina) Marcelo Agrelo	Castellano Power Team	Dodge GTX Cherokee	35	+34.186	30	7
29	115	(Argentina) Diego de Carlo	LRD Performance	Chevrolet Coupé SS	35	+38.835^{1}	13	6
30	77	(Argentina) Augusto Carinelli	Fancio Competición	Dodge GTX Cherokee	35	+41.739^{2}	5	5
31	111	(Argentina) Juan Garbelino	MV Racing	Dodge GTX Cherokee	35	+1:03.623	11	3
32	20	(Argentina) Juan José Ebarlín	LRD Performance	Chevrolet Coupé SS	35	+1:41.738	20	3
33	88	(Argentina) Nicolás Trosset	Uranga Racing	Ford Falcon	35	+1:57.032^{1}	47	3
34	99	(Argentina) Leonel Sotro	Alifraco Sport	Ford Falcon	34	+1 lap	10	3
35	119	(Argentina) Humberto Krujoski	SAP Team	Dodge GTX Cherokee	34	+1 lap	12	3
36	82	(Argentina) Carlos Okulovich	Maquin Parts Racing	Torino Cherokee	33	+2 laps	14	3
37	85	(Argentina) Ricardo Risatti III	LRD Performance	Chevrolet Coupé SS	32	Mechanical	45	3
38	53	(Argentina) Juan Tomás Catalán Magni	CM Sport	Ford Falcon	31		46	3
39	215	(Argentina) Gastón Crusitta	SJ Racing	Dodge GTX Cherokee	29		4	3
40	32	(Argentina) Norberto Fontana	RUS Med Team	Torino Cherokee	28	Crash damage	16	3
41	5	(Argentina) Santiago Mangoni	JP Carrera	Chevrolet Coupé SS	24	Mechanical	51	2
42	172	(Argentina) Santiago Álvarez	JP Carrera	Dodge GTX Cherokee	23	Crash	26	2
43	137	(Argentina) Otto Fritzler	Moriatis Competición	Ford Falcon	23	Crash	32	2
44	72	(Argentina) Martín Serrano	Sportteam	Chevrolet Coupé SS	23		1	2
45	123	(Argentina) Martín Vázquez	MV Racing	Dodge GTX Cherokee	18		17	2
46	121	(Argentina) Elio Craparo	Hermanos Álvarez Competición	Dodge GTX Cherokee	16	Mechanical	28	2
47	133	(Argentina) Valentín Aguirre	JP Carrera	Dodge GTX Cherokee	14		40	2
48	75	(Argentina) Sergio Alaux	Giavedoni Sport	Chevrolet Coupé SS	14		24	2
49	17	(Argentina) Nicolás Bonelli	RUS Med Team	Ford Falcon	14		48	2
50	197	(Argentina) Marcos Quijada	Uranga Racing	Dodge GTX Cherokee	11	Mechanical	27	2
51	134	(Argentina) Matías Jalaf	Jalaf Competición	Ford Falcon	6		9	2
52	25	(Argentina) Diego Ciantini	JP Carrera	Chevrolet Coupé SS	5	Engine	44	2
53	208	(Argentina) Gastón Ferrante	AyP Competición	Dodge GTX Cherokee	1	Stuck in gravel trap	7	2
Fastest Lap: Matías Rossi (Toyota Gazoo Racing Argentina), 1:42.587
Sources:

- ^1 – Santero, De Carlo and Trosset received 10-second post-race time penalties for unsafe pit releases.
- ^2 – Carinelli received a 10-second post-race time penalty for contact with Ebarlín.

== Championship standings ==
Drivers' Championship

Pos.	Driver	Pts	Gap
1	(Argentina) Mariano Werner	256.5	
2	(Argentina) Julián Santero	242.5	-14
3	(Uruguay) Mauricio Lambiris	229.5	-27
4	(Argentina) Jonatan Castellano	228.5	-28
5	(Uruguay) Marcos Landa	227	-29.5

- Note: Only the top five positions are included.

Previous race: 2023 Turismo Carretera Posadas round	Turismo Carretera; 2023 season	Next race: 2023 Buenos Aires Grand Prix
Previous race: 2022 Desafío de las Estrellas	Desafío de las Estrellas	Next race: incumbent
