= 2023 Turismo Carretera =

81st season of Turismo Carretera

The 2023 Turismo Carretera is the 81st season of Turismo Carretera, the premier stock car category of Argentina.

== Calendar ==
Round	Circuit (Event Name)	Date	Map
Etapa Regular (Regular season)			2023 Turismo Carretera is located in Argentina
1	(Río Negro Province) Autódromo Ciudad de Viedma; Viedma, Río Negro	February 12	2023 Turismo Carretera is located in Argentina
2	(Neuquén Province) Autódromo Parque Provincia del Neuquén; Centenario, Neuquén	March 5	2023 Turismo Carretera is located in Argentina
3	(La Pampa Province) Autódromo Provincia de La Pampa; Toay, La Pampa	March 26	2023 Turismo Carretera is located in Argentina
4	(Santa Cruz Province, Argentina) Autódromo Enrique Freile; El Calafate, Santa Cruz	April 16	2023 Turismo Carretera is located in Argentina
5	(Entre Ríos Province) Autódromo de Concepción del Uruguay; Concepción del Uruguay, Entre Ríos	April 30	2023 Turismo Carretera is located in Argentina
6	(Santiago del Estero Province) Autódromo Termas de Río Hondo; Termas de Río Hondo, Santiago del Estero	May 21	2023 Turismo Carretera is located in Argentina
7	(Santa Fe Province) Autódromo Ciudad de Rafaela (Carrera de los Millones); Rafaela, Santa Fe	June 11	2023 Turismo Carretera is located in Argentina
8	(Misiones Province) Autódromo Rosamonte; Posadas, Misiones	July 2	2023 Turismo Carretera is located in Argentina
9	(San Juan Province, Argentina) Circuito San Juan Villicum (Desafío de las Estrellas); Albardón, San Juan	July 23	2023 Turismo Carretera is located in Argentina
10	Autódromo Oscar y Juan Gálvez (Gran Premio de Buenos Aires); Buenos Aires	August 20	2023 Turismo Carretera is located in Argentina
Copa de Oro (playoffs)			2023 Turismo Carretera is located in Argentina
11	(San Luis Province) Autódromo Rosendo Hernández; San Luis, San Luis Province	September 17	2023 Turismo Carretera is located in Argentina
12	(Buenos Aires Province) Autódromo Juan María Traverso; San Nicolás, Buenos Aires Province	October 1	2023 Turismo Carretera is located in Argentina
13	(Santa Fe Province) Autódromo Ciudad de Rafaela; Rafaela, Santa Fe	October 29	2023 Turismo Carretera is located in Argentina
14	(La Pampa Province) Autódromo Provincia de La Pampa; Toay, La Pampa	November 12	2023 Turismo Carretera is located in Argentina
15	(San Juan Province, Argentina) Circuito San Juan Villicum; Albardón, San Juan	December 3	2023 Turismo Carretera is located in Argentina

== Teams and drivers ==
Manufacturer	Car	Entrant	#	Driver	Rounds
Chevrolet	Coupé SS	JP Carrera	5	(Argentina) Santiago Mangoni	All
Chevrolet	Coupé SS	JP Carrera	25	(Argentina) Diego Ciantini	All
Chevrolet	Coupé SS	Las Toscas Racing	6	(Argentina) Leonel Pernía	8–14
Chevrolet	Coupé SS	Las Toscas Racing	21	(Argentina) Christian Ledesma	All
Chevrolet	Coupé SS	LCA Racing	20	(Argentina) Juan José Ebarlín	1–6
Chevrolet	Coupé SS	LRD Performance	20	(Argentina) Juan José Ebarlín	All
Chevrolet	Coupé SS	LRD Performance	85	(Argentina) Ricardo Risatti	All
Chevrolet	Coupé SS	LRD Performance	115	(Argentina) Diego de Carlo	2–3, 6–15
Chevrolet	Coupé SS	Dole Racing	27	(Argentina) Gastón Mazzacane	All
Chevrolet	Coupé SS	Dose Competición	57	(Argentina) Christian Dose	1, 3
Chevrolet	Coupé SS	Sportteam	72	(Argentina) Martín Serrano	1–3, 5, 7–11, 13–14
Chevrolet	Coupé SS	Giavedoni Sport	75	(Argentina) Sergio Alaux	1–3, 5–11, 13–14
Chevrolet	Coupé SS	JP Carrera/JHR	78	(Argentina) Agustín Canapino	10, 12–15
Chevrolet	Coupé SS	RUS Med Team	83	(Argentina) Facundo Ardusso	7–15
Chevrolet	Coupé SS	Neuquén Energía	100	(Argentina) Camilo Echevarría	2
Chevrolet	Coupé SS	Alifraco Sport	155	(Argentina) Federico Iribarne	9–13
Dodge	GTX Cherokee	Castellano Power Team	7	(Argentina) Jonatan Castellano	All
Dodge	GTX Cherokee	Castellano Power Team	127	(Argentina) Marcelo Agrelo	All
Dodge	GTX Cherokee	AyP Competición	44	(Argentina) Facundo Della Motta	1–7
Dodge	GTX Cherokee	AyP Competición	208	(Argentina) Gastón Ferrante	9–15
Dodge	GTX Cherokee	SSB Competición	55	(Argentina) Leandro Mulet	10, 12, 14
Dodge	GTX Cherokee	Maquin Parts Racing	56	(Argentina) Germán Todino	All
Dodge	GTX Cherokee	Forte Sport	64	(Argentina) Christian di Scala	1–3, 5
Dodge	GTX Cherokee	Fancio Competición	77	(Argentina) Augusto Carinelli	All
Dodge	GTX Cherokee	Di Meglio Motorsport	87	(Argentina) Juan Martín Trucco	All
Dodge	GTX Cherokee	MV Racing	111	(Argentina) Juan Garbelino	1–5, 7–11, 14–15
Dodge	GTX Cherokee	MV Racing	123	(Argentina) Martín Vázquez	All
Dodge	GTX Cherokee	SAP Team	119	(Argentina) Humberto Krujoski	All
Dodge	GTX Cherokee	Hermanos Álvarez Competición	121	(Argentina) Elio Craparo	All
Dodge	GTX Cherokee	JP Carrera	133	(Argentina) Valentín Aguirre	All
Dodge	GTX Cherokee	JP Carrera	172	(Argentina) Santiago Álvarez	All
Dodge	GTX Cherokee	Dole Racing	155	(Argentina) Federico Iribarne	2–8
Dodge	GTX Cherokee	Dole Racing	197	(Argentina) Marcos Quijada	1
Dodge	GTX Cherokee	Uranga Racing	197	(Argentina) Marcos Quijada	3–9, 10–15
Dodge	GTX Cherokee	SJ Racing	215	(Argentina) Gastón Crusitta	9–10, 12
Dodge	GTX Cherokee	Azar Motorsport	232	(Argentina) Gustavo Micheloud	1–3, 5–12, 14
Ford	Falcon	Memo Corse	2	(Argentina) Mariano Werner	All
Ford	Falcon	Gurí Martínez Competición	6	(Argentina) Leonel Pernía	1–7
Ford	Falcon	Gurí Martínez Competición	44	(Argentina) Facundo Della Motta	9–15
Ford	Falcon	Alifraco Sport	9	(Uruguay) Mauricio Lambiris	All
Ford	Falcon	Alifraco Sport	99	(Argentina) Leonel Sotro	1–3, 5–13
Ford	Falcon	CM Sport	14	(Argentina) Juan Bautista de Benedictis	1–7
Ford	Falcon	CM Sport	37	(Argentina) Emiliano Spataro	7–15
Ford	Falcon	CM Sport	53	(Argentina) Juan Tomás Catalán Magni	All
Ford	Falcon	Abdala Racing	14	(Argentina) Juan Bautista de Benedictis	8–15
Ford	Falcon	DTA Racing	15	(Argentina) Luis José di Palma	1
Ford	Falcon	DTA Racing	116	(Argentina) Alan Ruggiero	2–15
Ford	Falcon	RUS Med Team	17	(Argentina) Nicolás Bonelli	All
Ford	Falcon	Ponce de León Racing	30	(Argentina) Gabriel Ponce de León	3, 5–15
Ford	Falcon	Buenos Aires Racing	37	(Argentina) Emiliano Spataro	1–6
Ford	Falcon	LCA Racing	68	(Argentina) Julián Santero	All
Ford	Falcon	Uranga Racing	88	(Argentina) Nicolás Trosset	All
Ford	Falcon	Savino Sport	116	(Argentina) Alan Ruggiero	1
Ford	Falcon	Jalaf Competición	134	(Argentina) Matías Jalaf	1–7, 9
Ford	Falcon	Moriatis Competición	137	(Argentina) Otto Fritzler	All
Torino	Cherokee	Maquin Parts Racing	1	(Argentina) José Manuel Urcera	All
Torino	Cherokee	Maquin Parts Racing	4	(Argentina) Esteban Gini	1–8
Torino	Cherokee	Maquin Parts Racing	82	(Argentina) Carlos Okulovich	1–12
Torino	Cherokee	RUS Med Team	32	(Argentina) Norberto Fontana	All
Torino	Cherokee	RUS Med Team	83	(Argentina) Facundo Ardusso	1–6
Torino	Cherokee	RUS Med Team	103	(Argentina) Christian Iván Ramos	1–5
Torino	Cherokee	Sprint Racing	54	(Argentina) Nicolás Cotignola	1–6, 8–15
Torino	Cherokee	Midas Carrera Team	93	(Argentina) Matías Rodríguez	1–5, 7–9
Torino	Cherokee	Trotta Racing Team	95	(Uruguay) Marcos Landa	All
Torino	Cherokee	Trotta Racing Team	96	(Argentina) Juan Cruz Benvenuti	All
Torino	Cherokee	Ugalde Competición	101	(Argentina) Lionel Ugalde	1–3, 5–6, 10, 14
Torino	Cherokee	Candela Competición	161	(Argentina) Kevin Candela	All
Torino	Cherokee	Las Toscas Racing	177	(Argentina) Ayrton Londero	All
Torino	Cherokee	Sportteam	208	(Argentina) Gastón Ferrante	3–8
Toyota	Camry 2022	Maquin Parts Racing	4	(Argentina) Esteban Gini	9–13
Toyota	Camry 2022	Toyota Gazoo Racing Argentina	117	(Argentina) Matías Rossi	All
Toyota	Camry 2022	Toyota Gazoo Racing Argentina	122	(Argentina) Andrés Jakos	All

=== Changes ===
- Agustín Canapino left the championship to join Juncos Hollinger Racing in the IndyCar Series.
- Otto Fritzler and Santiago Álvarez graduated from the TC Pista series as reigning champion and runner-up respectively. 2021 TC Mouras champion Marcos Quijada also joined the series, along with Humberto Krujoski, Elio Craparo, Martín Vázquez, Gustavo Micheloud, Cristian di Scala and Juan Garbelino.
- Norberto Fontana switched from Chevrolet to Torino.
- Germán Todino switched from Torino to Dodge.
- Leonel Pernía and Emiliano Spataro switched from Torino to Ford.

== Results and standings ==
=== Results summary ===
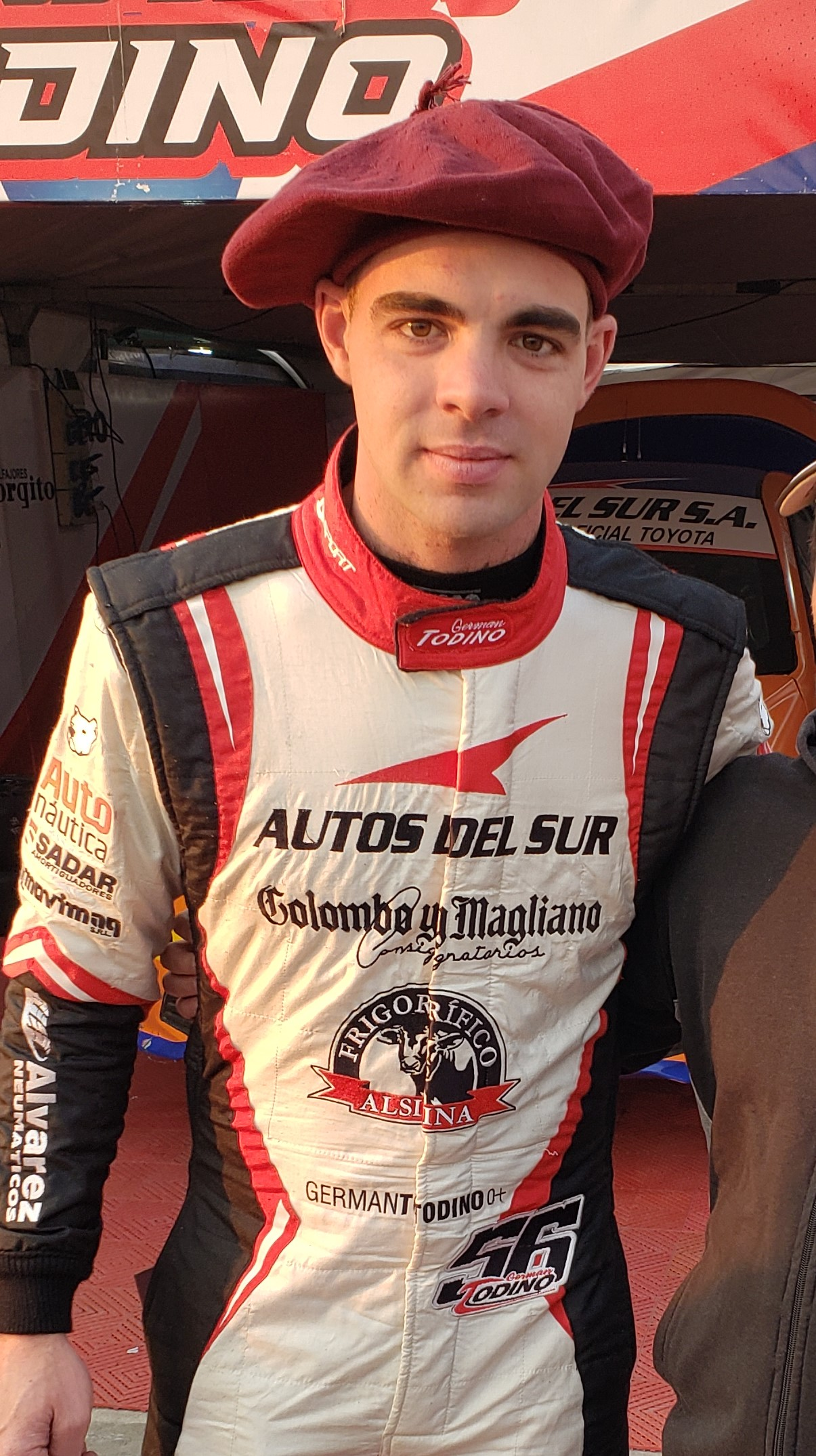
Germán Todino (pictured in 2022) won four Finals, the most of any driver in 2023.

Round		Pole position	Heat winners	Final winner	Report / Source
1	Viedma	(Argentina) Mariano Werner (Ford)	H1: (Argentina) Mariano Werner (Ford); H2: (Argentina) Julián Santero (Ford); H3: (Argentina) Matías Rossi (Toyota)	(Argentina) Mariano Werner (Ford)	
2	Neuquén	(Argentina) Julián Santero (Ford)	H1: (Argentina) Julián Santero (Ford); H2: (Argentina) Juan Tomás Catalán Magni (Ford); H3: (Argentina) Otto Fritzler (Ford)	(Argentina) Juan Tomás Catalán Magni (Ford)	
3	Toay 1	(Argentina) Matías Rossi (Toyota)	—N/a	(Argentina) Diego Ciantini (Chevrolet)	
4	El Calafate	(Argentina) Otto Fritzler (Ford)	H1: (Uruguay) Mauricio Lambiris (Ford); H2: (Argentina) Marcos Quijada (Dodge); H3: (Argentina) Santiago Mangoni (Chevrolet)	(Argentina) Julián Santero (Ford)	
5	Concepción del Uruguay	(Argentina) Jonatan Castellano (Dodge)	H1: (Argentina) Mariano Werner (Ford); H2: (Argentina) Julián Santero (Ford); H3: (Argentina) Santiago Álvarez (Dodge)	(Argentina) Germán Todino (Dodge)	
6	Termas de Río Hondo	(Argentina) Christian Ledesma (Chevrolet)	H1: (Argentina) Christian Ledesma (Chevrolet); H2: (Argentina) Gastón Mazzacane (Chevrolet); H3: (Argentina) Diego Ciantini (Chevrolet)	(Argentina) Otto Fritzler (Ford)	
7	Rafaela 1	(Argentina) Gastón Mazzacane (Chevrolet)	H1: (Argentina) Matías Rossi (Toyota); H2: (Argentina) Santiago Mangoni (Chevrolet); H3: (Argentina) Valentín Aguirre (Dodge)	(Argentina) Santiago Mangoni (Chevrolet)	
8	Posadas	(Argentina) José Manuel Urcera (Torino)	H1: (Argentina) José Manuel Urcera (Torino); H2: (Argentina) Gastón Mazzacane (Chevrolet); H3: (Argentina) Mariano Werner (Ford)	(Argentina) Mariano Werner (Ford)	
9	San Juan Villicum 1	Grid determined by lottery	—N/a	(Argentina) Matías Rossi (Toyota)	report
10	Buenos Aires	(Argentina) Marcos Quijada (Dodge)	H1: (Argentina) Marcos Quijada (Dodge); H2: (Argentina) Santiago Álvarez (Dodge); H3: (Argentina) Leonel Sotro (Ford)	(Argentina) Valentín Aguirre (Dodge)	report
11	San Luis	(Argentina) Julián Santero (Ford)	H1: (Argentina) Julián Santero (Ford); H2: (Argentina) Facundo Ardusso (Chevrolet); H3: (Argentina) Mariano Werner (Ford)	(Argentina) Julián Santero (Ford)	
12	San Nicolás	(Argentina) Facundo Ardusso (Chevrolet)	H1: (Argentina) Facundo Ardusso (Chevrolet); H2: (Argentina) Julián Santero (Ford); H3: (Argentina) Germán Todino (Dodge)	(Argentina) Germán Todino (Dodge)	
13	Rafaela 2	(Argentina) Mariano Werner (Ford)	H1: (Argentina) Mariano Werner (Ford); H2: (Argentina) Diego Ciantini (Chevrolet); H3: (Argentina) Santiago Mangoni (Chevrolet)	(Argentina) Mariano Werner (Ford)	
14	Toay 2	(Argentina) Juan Martín Trucco (Dodge)	H1: (Argentina) Juan Martín Trucco (Dodge); H2: (Argentina) Juan Cruz Benvenuti (Torino); H3: (Argentina) Agustín Canapino (Chevrolet)	(Argentina) Germán Todino (Dodge)	
15	San Juan Villicum 2	(Argentina) Germán Todino (Dodge)	H1: (Argentina) Germán Todino (Dodge); H2: (Argentina) Julián Santero (Ford); H3: (Argentina) Mariano Werner (Ford)	(Argentina) Germán Todino (Dodge)	

=== Championship standings ===
Points system

Position		1st	2nd	3rd	4th	5th	6th	7th	8th	9th	10th	11th	12th	13th	14th	15th	16th	17th	18th	19th	20th	21st	22nd	23rd	24th	25th	26th	27th	28th	29th	30th	31st to 40th	41st down
Regular	Qualifying	2																															
Regular	Heats	5	4.5	4	3.5	3	2.5	2	1.5	1	0.5																						
Regular	Final	40	37	34	31	30	29	28	27	26	25	24	23	22	21	20	19	18	17	16	15	14	13	12	11	10	9	8	7	6	5	3	2
Finale	Qualifying	3																															
Finale	Heats	7.5	6.75	6	5.25	4.5	3.75	3	2.25	1.5	0.75																						
Finale	Final	60	55.5	51	46.5	45	43.5	42	40.5	39	37.5	36	34.5	33	31.5	30	28.5	27	25.5	24	22.5	21	19.5	18	16.5	15	13.5	12	10.5	9	7.5	4.5	3

==== Regular Season standings ====
Numbers in superscript (e.g. ^{1}) refer to a drivers' heat race finishing position. The third round at Toay and the ninth round at San Juan Villicum did not feature heat races.

Pos.	Driver	(Río Negro Province) VIE	(Neuquén Province) NEU	(La Pampa Province) TOA1	(Santa Cruz Province, Argentina) ELC	(Entre Ríos Province) CDU	(Santiago del Estero Province) TRH	(Santa Fe Province) RAF1	(Misiones Province) POS	(San Juan Province, Argentina) VIL1	(Buenos Aires) BUE	(San Luis Province) SLU	(Buenos Aires Province) SNI	(Santa Fe Province) RAF2	(La Pampa Province) TOA2	(San Juan Province, Argentina) VIL2	Total
1	(Argentina) Mariano Werner	1^{1}	4^{2}	4	10^{8}	51^{1}	21^{15}	4^{2}	1^{1}	20	10^{13}	2^{1}	12^{2}	1^{1}	15^{6}	4^{1}	676.5 (Note: Werner received a bonus 200 points as the winner of the Copa de Oro.)
2	(Argentina) Julián Santero	46^{1}	2^{1}	5	1^{2}	3^{1}	13^{9}	36^{13}	10^{3}	12	8^{9}	1^{1}	2^{1}	26^{4}	23^{9}	2^{1}	448
3	(Argentina) Germán Todino	5^{6}	8^{4}	13	34^{9}	1^{2}	42^{14}	9^{4}	11^{6}	8	41^{15}	44^{4}	1^{1}	17^{11}	1^{2}	1^{1}	404
4	(Argentina) Jonatan Castellano	2^{2}	7^{4}	39	5^{2}	2^{2}	3^{3}	44^{4}	29^{9}	11	6^{8}	6^{2}	47^{12}	5^{2}	14^{5}	8^{4}	398.75
5	(Argentina) Santiago Mangoni	28^{10}	10^{5}	54	3^{1}	6^{4}	4^{4}	1^{1}	8^{5}	41	43^{12}	8^{3}	15^{6}	2^{1}	9^{3}	12^{5}	387
6	(Uruguay) Mauricio Lambiris	4^{5}	3^{3}	50	2^{1}	5^{4}	10^{5}	19^{13}	19^{13}	15	3^{6}	17^{12}	19^{3}	25^{15}	19^{8}	5^{3}	382.5
7	(Uruguay) Marcos Landa	47^{4}	15^{11}	2	8^{4}	9^{7}	14^{11}	7^{3}	16^{17}	3	31^{10}	7^{5}	4^{4}	28^{9}	3^{3}	10^{7}	382.5
8	(Argentina) José Manuel Urcera	14^{DSQ}	6^{2}	29	7^{4}	10^{6}	24^{DSQ}	34^{14}	4^{1}	7	20^{17}	3^{2}	22^{8}	11^{4}	10^{4}	15^{2}	360.25
9	(Argentina) Juan Martín Trucco	22^{5}	DSQ^{10}	53	16^{7}	8^{5}	20^{7}	6^{3}	18^{5}	14	15^{11}	10^{6}	8^{3}	15^{6}	2^{1}	17^{6}	336.25
10	(Argentina) Valentín Aguirre	15^{4}	5^{3}	11	33^{3}	42^{3}	41^{DNS}	2^{1}	5^{2}	47	1^{3}	23^{14}	6^{4}	6^{5}	11^{6}	38^{5}	331
11	(Argentina) Christian Ledesma	8^{6}	23^{9}	9	30^{14}	17^{7}	16^{1}	5^{3}	43^{17}	18	48^{5}	12^{5}	14^{6}	10^{4}	17^{4}	14^{4}	314.75
12	(Argentina) Gastón Mazzacane	13^{14}	32^{8}	3	38^{5}	12^{4}	17^{1}	10^{2}	2^{1}	22	25^{11}	16^{8}	46^{6}	9^{5}	4^{2}	34^{2}	313.25
13	(Argentina) Juan Tomás Catalán Magni	3^{3}	1^{1}	14	31^{11}	7^{3}	7^{4}	15^{8}	46^{4}	38	22^{13}	34^{5}	14^{4}	22^{9}	25^{12}	16^{6}	300.25
14	(Argentina) Marcelo Agrelo	6^{2}	45^{9}	16	39^{6}	49^{5}	34^{4}	25^{9}	14^{8}	28	33^{12}	9^{3}	DNS^{7}	8^{3}	8^{5}	6^{5}	280
15	(Argentina) Nicolás Trosset	12^{7}	31^{5}	12	11^{5}	16^{9}	18^{7}	17^{12}	12^{7}	33	16^{13}	31^{10}	9^{5}	12^{6}	28^{15}	33^{7}	257.5
16	(Argentina) Juan Cruz Benvenuti	16^{8}	12^{6}	48	9^{3}	19^{12}	8^{10}	22^{15}	DSQ^{15}	27	14^{16}	43^{7}	17^{7}	14^{5}	5^{1}	37^{8}	253.25
17	(Argentina) Nicolás Bonelli	18^{5}	9^{4}	17	40^{16}	26^{13}	12^{6}	13^{2}	25^{14}	49	19^{8}	18^{8}	28^{9}	7^{2}	45^{9}	24^{13}	239.5
18	(Argentina) Leonel Pernía	17^{11}	18^{2}	56	6^{3}	38^{12}	38^{16}	37^{5}	7^{4}	17	13^{10}	20^{9}	3^{2}	16^{8}	43^{7}		237.5
19	(Argentina) Diego Ciantini	29^{3}	30^{8}	1	36^{4}	4^{2}	2^{1}	20^{16}	45^{3}	52	45^{3}	21^{6}	7^{3}	43^{1}	31^{16}	32^{7}	235.5
20	(Argentina) Matías Rossi	36^{1}	13^{5}	43	28^{15}	18^{10}	DSQ^{16}	3^{1}	3^{2}	1	29^{11}	47^{4}	16^{9}	37^{16}	42^{14}	26^{10}	229.75
21	(Argentina) Otto Fritzler	48^{8}	50^{1}	6	13^{15}	29^{8}	1^{2}	21^{10}	41^{9}	43	DNS^{16}	5^{2}	41^{2}	24^{8}	29^{10}	13^{9}	229.5
22	(Argentina) Juan José Ebarlín	19^{9}	41^{18}	26	14^{8}	23^{DSQ}	23^{14}		28^{10}	32	39^{12}	37^{8}	18^{7}	4^{3}	7^{4}	7^{3}	226
23	(Argentina) Esteban Gini	7^{6}	49^{6}	7	18^{11}	37^{3}	6^{5}	26^{10}	40^{4}	4	DSQ^{10}	33^{3}	DNS^{5}	13^{7}			224.5
24	(Argentina) Ricardo Risatti	20^{9}	44^{7}	8	15^{6}	14^{6}	22^{10}	11^{6}	20^{15}	37	36^{17}	25^{15}	23^{11}	23^{12}	22^{9}	23^{8}	222.25
25	(Argentina) Elio Craparo	10^{2}	11^{6}	20	37^{7}	22^{14}	15^{12}	35^{8}	13^{6}	46	32^{2}	51^{4}	44^{5}	41^{7}	6^{2}	20^{12}	218
26	(Argentina) Facundo Ardusso	40^{7}	48^{3}	18	29^{10}	28^{DNS}	37^{9}	12^{7}	42^{12}	24	46^{7}	4^{1}	5^{1}	38^{2}	40^{7}	11^{3}	215
27	(Argentina) Santiago Álvarez	9^{3}	19^{13}	45	22^{10}	41^{1}	31^{12}	43^{8}	39^{15}	42	2^{1}	26^{15}	25^{8}	19^{9}	18^{5}	19^{11}	203.5
28	(Argentina) Andrés Jakos	37^{7}	35^{10}	30	4^{2}	46^{5}	40^{15}	8^{5}	30^{7}	2	DSQ^{5}	36^{12}	29^{10}	29^{11}	46^{15}	9^{10}	191.25
29	(Argentina) Ayrton Londero	39^{13}	16^{7}	28	41^{6}	11^{8}	5^{2}	24^{11}	22^{13}	26	4^{3}	41^{11}	38^{10}	34^{15}	30^{14}	28^{11}	187.5
30	(Argentina) Marcos Quijada	51^{15}		15	12^{1}	DSQ^{11}	25^{14}	14^{6}	37^{11}	50	30^{1}	14^{9}	20^{9}	42^{13}	13^{3}	29^{9}	177
31	(Argentina) Gabriel Ponce de León			25		15^{7}	19^{6}	16^{7}	9^{5}	16	47^{9}	40^{11}	24^{11}	WD^{DNS}	20^{6}	22^{15}	173.5
32	(Argentina) Agustín Canapino										12^{DNS}	13^{7}	45^{16}	3^{3}	12^{1}	3^{2}	172.75
33	(Argentina) Juan Bautista de Benedictis	26^{10}	28^{9}	38	43^{15}	52^{15}	33^{12}	31^{12}	6^{3}	10	9^{7}	19^{8}	32^{12}	27^{10}	21^{8}	42^{10}	164.25
34	(Argentina) Emiliano Spataro	23^{13}	34^{10}	23	32^{13}	53^{9}	9^{3}	28^{7}	36^{11}	25	DSQ^{4}	38^{13}	21^{8}	21^{6}	27^{11}	31^{4}	141.75
35	(Argentina) Sergio Alaux	24^{16}	20^{15}	49		27^{10}	11^{7}	23^{11}	21^{8}	48	7^{6}	35^{14}		31^{DNS}	33^{7}		132.5
36	(Argentina) Facundo Della Motta	44^{11}	52^{18}	44	24^{8}	20^{15}	29^{9}	45^{16}	17^{6}	13	27^{9}	32^{7}	42^{15}	20^{7}	32^{10}	39^{13}	126
37	(Argentina) Alan Ruggiero	43^{12}	14^{7}	21	DSQ^{14}	25^{11}	DSQ^{3}	DNS^{15}	23^{12}	21	18^{8}	44^{13}	33^{14}	33^{12}	26^{11}	41^{12}	117.5
38	(Argentina) Nicolás Cotignola	30^{18}	17^{15}	22	27^{14}	39^{14}	DSQ^{13}		44^{7}	9	17^{17}	49^{10}	27^{17}	32^{14}	48^{12}	35^{11}	115
39	(Argentina) Martín Vázquez	49^{17}	22^{12}	24	21^{13}	44^{9}	39^{8}	42^{5}	33^{9}	45	42^{6}	28^{10}		39^{14}	24^{8}	18^{8}	113.75
40	(Argentina) Kevin Candela	38^{10}	43^{17}	34	26^{12}	30^{17}	45^{2}	46^{4}	50^{2}	5	37^{14}	48^{11}	43^{16}	18^{8}	47^{13}	40^{6}	106.75
41	(Argentina) Humberto Krujoski	11^{4}	40^{11}	46	46^{5}	36^{11}	30^{5}	41^{9}	26^{10}	35	34^{2}	27^{12}	31^{14}	35^{10}	37^{11}	25^{DNS}	104
42	(Argentina) Augusto Carinelli	34^{11}	27^{16}	31	35^{10}	35^{16}	28^{11}	30^{11}	48^{13}	30	11^{5}	39^{14}	40^{12}	46^{13}	34^{13}	21^{9}	100
43	(Argentina) Matías Rodríguez	50^{12}	26^{8}	19	25^{9}	13^{6}		DNS^{16}	35^{8}	6							97.5
44	(Argentina) Lionel Ugalde	35^{14}	39^{11}	10		21^{10}	26^{8}				5^{2}				36^{13}		93.5
45	(Argentina) Gastón Ferrante			33	42^{9}	43^{12}	43^{6}	47^{10}	38^{12}	53	26^{4}	11^{6}	34^{10}	45^{10}	16^{10}	36^{12}	89
46	(Argentina) Carlos Okulovich	33^{12}	33^{12}	35	20^{13}	32^{13}	27^{15}	33^{15}	15^{10}	36	24^{14}	30^{15}	30^{14}				82.5
47	(Argentina) Norberto Fontana	32^{14}	24^{13}	42	17^{12}	40^{16}	35^{11}	18^{9}	32^{14}	40	38^{DNS}	50^{16}	39^{13}	36^{11}	41^{13}	DNS^{14}	77
48	(Argentina) Diego de Carlo		36^{14}	51			32^{13}	29^{17}	34^{11}	29	35^{15}	24^{17}	26^{11}	30^{12}	35^{16}	27^{14}	66
49	(Argentina) Martín Serrano	53^{14}	29^{14}	47		31^{DNS}		27^{12}	27^{16}	44	28^{28}	22^{16}		44^{14}	44^{12}		58.5
50	(Argentina) Gustavo Micheloud	52^{15}	37^{17}	36		24^{16}	36^{8}	40^{14}	24^{16}	23	WD^{DNS}	42^{16}	37^{13}		38^{16}		57.5
51	(Argentina) Leonel Sotro	42^{17}	51^{17}	37		34^{14}	44^{10}	38^{6}	31^{17}	34	44^{1}	15^{13}	48^{16}	40^{13}			56
52	(Argentina) Matías Jalaf	27^{9}	20^{12}	41	19^{12}	33^{18}	DSQ^{13}	32^{13}		51							50
53	(Argentina) Federico Iribarne		42^{14}	32	44^{7}	47^{8}	46^{17}	39^{14}	49^{14}	19	DSQ^{7}	29^{17}	49^{15}	DNS^{16}			45.5
54	(Argentina) Christian Iván Ramos	25^{8}	25^{13}	27	23^{11}	48^{17}											43.5
55	(Argentina) Juan Garbelino	45^{16}	46^{15}	40	45^{16}	45^{15}		48^{17}	47^{16}	31	23^{15}	45^{17}			39^{15}	30^{13}	42.5
56	(Argentina) Leandro Mulet										21^{16}		36^{13}		WD^{DNS}		17
57	(Argentina) Luis José di Palma	21^{15}															14
58	(Argentina) Christian di Scala	31^{17}	47^{16}	55		50^{13}											9
59	(Argentina) Gastón Crusitta									39	40^{14}		35^{15}				9
60	(Argentina) Christian Dose	41^{13}		52													4
61	(Argentina) Camilo Echevarría		38^{16}														3
Pos.	Driver	(Río Negro Province) VIE	(Neuquén Province) NEU	(La Pampa Province) TOA1	(Santa Cruz Province, Argentina) ELC	(Entre Ríos Province) CDU	(Santiago del Estero Province) TRH	(Santa Fe Province) RAF1	(Misiones Province) POS	(San Juan Province, Argentina) VIL1	(Buenos Aires) BUE	(San Luis Province) SLU	(Buenos Aires Province) SNI	(Santa Fe Province) RAF2	(La Pampa Province) TOA2	(San Juan Province, Argentina) VIL2	Total

==== Copa de Oro standings ====
Drivers in blue denote "last chance qualifiers"; the top three drivers in the regular standings that did not qualify for the playoffs, who were admitted along with the points they scored over the previous four rounds.

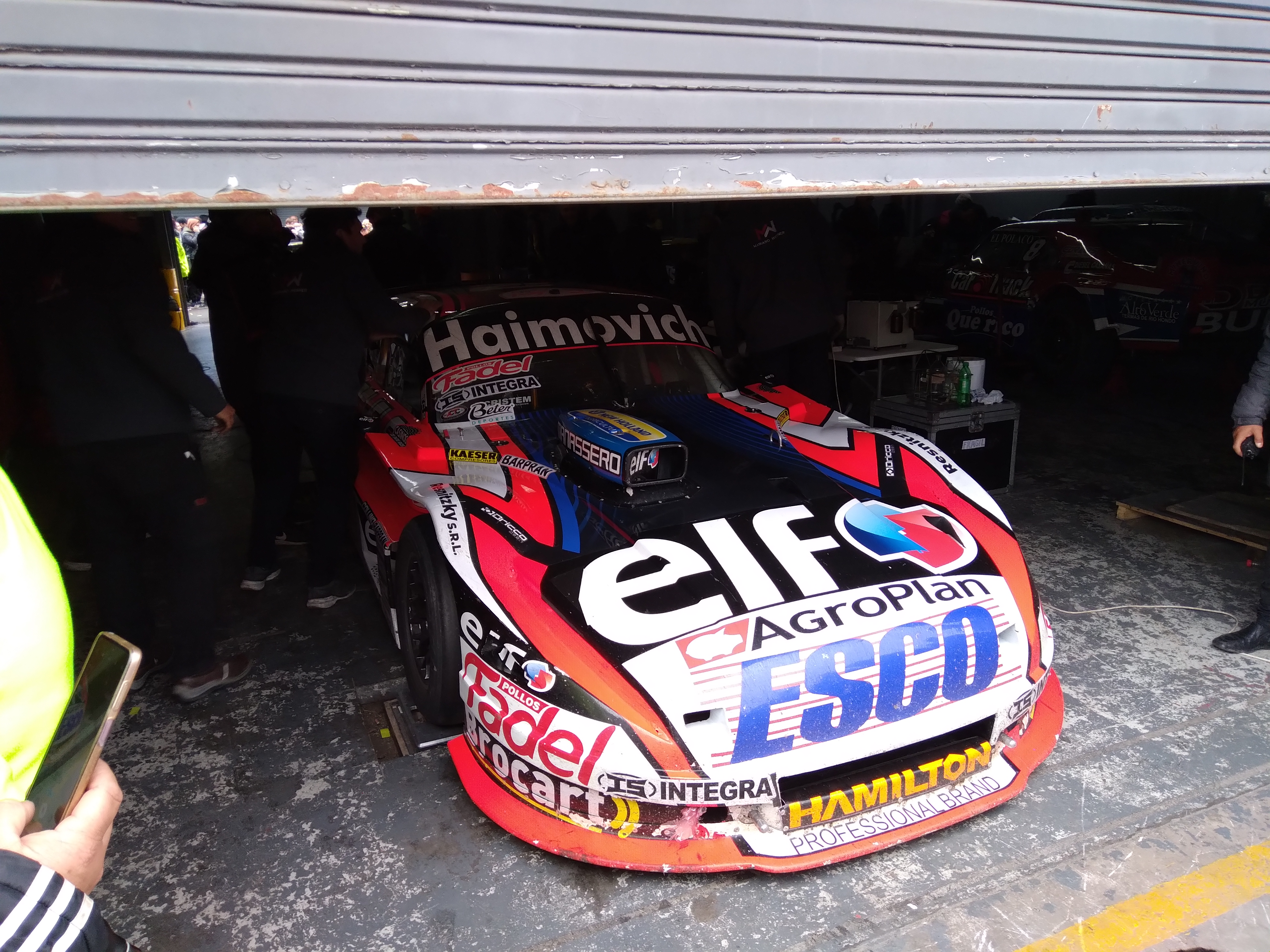
Mariano Werner won both the Regular Season and Copa de Oro in 2023.

Pos.	Driver	Starting	(San Luis Province) SLU	(Buenos Aires Province) SNI	(Santa Fe Province) RAF2	(La Pampa Province) TOA2	(San Juan Province, Argentina) VIL2	Total
1	(Argentina) Mariano Werner	31	2^{1}	12^{2}	1^{1}	15^{6}	4^{1}	226
2	(Argentina) Germán Todino	8	44^{4}	1^{1}	17^{11}	1^{2}	1^{1}	191.5
3	(Argentina) Julián Santero	8	1^{1}	2^{1}	26^{4}	23^{9}	2^{1}	185.5
4	(Argentina) Santiago Mangoni	8	8^{3}	15^{6}	2^{1}	9^{3}	12^{5}	172.5
5	(Argentina) Juan Martín Trucco	125	N/A				17^{6}	155.75
6	(Uruguay) Marcos Landa	0	7^{5}	4^{4}	28^{9}	3^{3}	10^{7}	152
7	(Argentina) José Manuel Urcera	0	3^{2}	22^{8}	11^{4}	10^{4}	15^{2}	145.75
8	(Argentina) Jonatan Castellano	0	6^{2}	47^{12}	5^{2}	14^{5}	8^{4}	139.75
9	(Argentina) Christian Ledesma	100.5	N/A				14^{4}	137.25
10	(Argentina) Valentín Aguirre	8	23^{14}	6^{4}	6^{5}	11^{6}	38^{5}	120
11	(Uruguay) Mauricio Lambiris	0	17^{12}	19^{3}	25^{15}	19^{8}	5^{3}	116.5
12	(Argentina) Gastón Mazzacane	0	16^{8}	46^{6}	9^{5}	4^{2}	34^{2}	100.75
13	(Argentina) Juan Tomás Catalán Magni	8	34^{5}	14^{4}	22^{9}	25^{12}	16^{6}	94.75
14	(Argentina) Nicolás Trosset	65	N/A				33^{7}	72.5
15	(Argentina) Matías Rossi	8	47^{4}	16^{9}	37^{16}	42^{14}	26^{10}	52.75
