= Autódromo Roberto Mouras =

Autódromo Roberto José Mouras (La Plata)
- Full Circuit with 2 Chicane (1996–present)
- Location: La Plata, Buenos Aires Province, Argentina
- Coordinates: 34°58′50.6″S 58°10′49.6″W
- Opened: 20 October 1996; 29 years ago
- Major events: Current: Turismo Nacional (1997–1999, 2003–2018, 2020–2021, 2026); TC Mouras (2004–present); TC Pick Up (2018–present); Former: Turismo Carretera (1996–2012, 2014–2017, 2020–2021, 2024–2025); TC2000 (1996, 2011); Top Race V6 (2001, 2003–2010, 2017–2019); SASTC (1999)

Full Circuit (1996–present)
- Length: 4.265 km (2.650 mi)
- Turns: 8
- Race lap record: 1:24.509 ( (Argentina) Agustín Canapino, Chevrolet Camaro TC, 2025, TC)

Full Circuit with Chicane (1996–present)
- Length: 4.400 km (2.734 mi)
- Turns: 11
- Race lap record: 1:33.997 ( (Argentina) Lucas Bohdanowicz, Dodge Cherokee, 2025, TCM)

Autódromo Roberto José Mouras is a motorsports circuit located in La Plata, Argentina. It has hosted events in the Turismo Carretera series. Currently the track is 4.265 km (2.650 mi) long. The inaugural race was on October 20, 1996 with a Turismo Carretera race, which was won by Emilio Satriano.

== Events ==
Current

- January: TC Mouras, TC Pista Mouras
- February: TC Pick Up, TC Pista Pick Up, Turismo Pista
- March: TC Mouras, TC Pista Mouras, TC Pick Up, TC Pista Pick Up, TC Junior
- April: TC Mouras, TC Pista Mouras, TC Pick Up, TC Pista Pick Up
- May: TC Mouras, TC Pista Mouras, TC Pick Up, TC Pista Pick Up
- June: Turismo Nacional, TC Mouras, TC Pista Mouras, TC Pick Up, TC Pista Pick Up, TC Junior
- July: TC Mouras, TC Pista Mouras
- August: TC Mouras, TC Pista Mouras
- September: TC Mouras, TC Pista Mouras
- October: TC Mouras, TC Pista Mouras
- November: TC Mouras, TC Pista Mouras
- December: Turismo Carretera, Turismo Carretera Pista, Fórmula 2 Argentina, TC Mouras, TC Pista Mouras

Former

- South American Super Touring Car Championship (1999)
- TC2000 Championship (1996, 2011)
- TC2000 Series (2013–2016, 2018)
- Top Race V6 (2001, 2003–2010, 2017–2019)
- Turismo Carretera 2000 (2025)

== Lap records ==
As of December 2025, the fastest official race lap records at the Autódromo Roberto José Mouras are listed as:

| Category | Time | Driver | Vehicle | Event |
Full Circuit (1996–present): 4.265 km (2.650 mi)
| Turismo Carretera | 1:24.509 | Agustín Canapino | Chevrolet Camaro TC | 2024 La Plata Turismo Carretera round |
| TC Mouras | 1:26.304 | Eugenio Provens | Dodge Cherokee | 2025 9th La Plata TC Mouras round |
| Formula Renault 2.0 | 1:27.269 | Valentino Alaux | Tito F4-A | 2025 La Plata Fórmula 2 Argentina round |
| TC Pick Up | 1:27.896 | Germán Todino | Toyota Hilux VIII | 2025 7th La Plata TC Pick Up round |
| TC2000 | 1:29.112 | Mariano Werner | Toyota Corolla | 2011 200 km de Buenos Aires |
| Super Touring | 1:39.380 | Osvaldo López | Alfa Romeo 156 D2 | 1999 La Plata SASTC round |
Full Circuit with Chicane (1996–present): 4.400 km (2.734 mi)
| TC Mouras | 1:33.997 | Lucas Bohdanowicz | Chevrolet Chevy | 2025 10th La Plata TC Mouras round |
