= Autódromo Enrique Freile =

- Location: El Calafate, Santa Cruz Province, Argentina
- Coordinates: 50°19′22.54″S 72°9′4.66″W
- Broke ground: 2020
- Opened: 15 April 2023; 3 years ago
- Architect: Sergio Salazar
- Major events: Current: Turismo Carretera (2023–present); Former: Turismo Nacional (2023)

Full Circuit (2023–present)
- Length: 3.800 km (2.361 mi)
- Turns: 15
- Race lap record: 1:20.357 ( (Argentina) Julián Santero, Ford Falcon TC, 2023, TC)

Autódromo Enrique Freile is a 3.800 km (2.361 mi) motorsports circuit located in El Calafate, Argentina.

== History ==
The circuit broke ground in 2020 and was opened on 15 April 2023 with a round of Turismo Carretera. It is named after Enrique Freile, who was active in local rally competitions in the 1960s, and is the southernmost FIA-recognised circuit in the world – a record previously held by Teretonga Park in New Zealand. It has also hosted TC Pista, Turismo Carretera's feeder series, and Turismo Nacional.

== Lap records ==
As of October 2023, the fastest official race lap records at the Autódromo Enrique Freile are listed as:

Category	Time	Driver	Vehicle	Event
Full Circuit (2023–present): 3.800 km (2.361 mi)
Turismo Carretera	1:20.357	Julián Santero	Ford Falcon TC	2023 El Calafate Turismo Carretera round
Turismo Nacional Clase 3	1:27.774	Facundo Chapur	Ford Focus III	2023 El Calafate Turismo Nacional round
Turismo Nacional Clase 2	1:31.694	Maximiliano Bestani	Toyota Etios	2023 El Calafate Turismo Nacional round
