= Mauricio Lambiris =

Racing driver from Uruguay

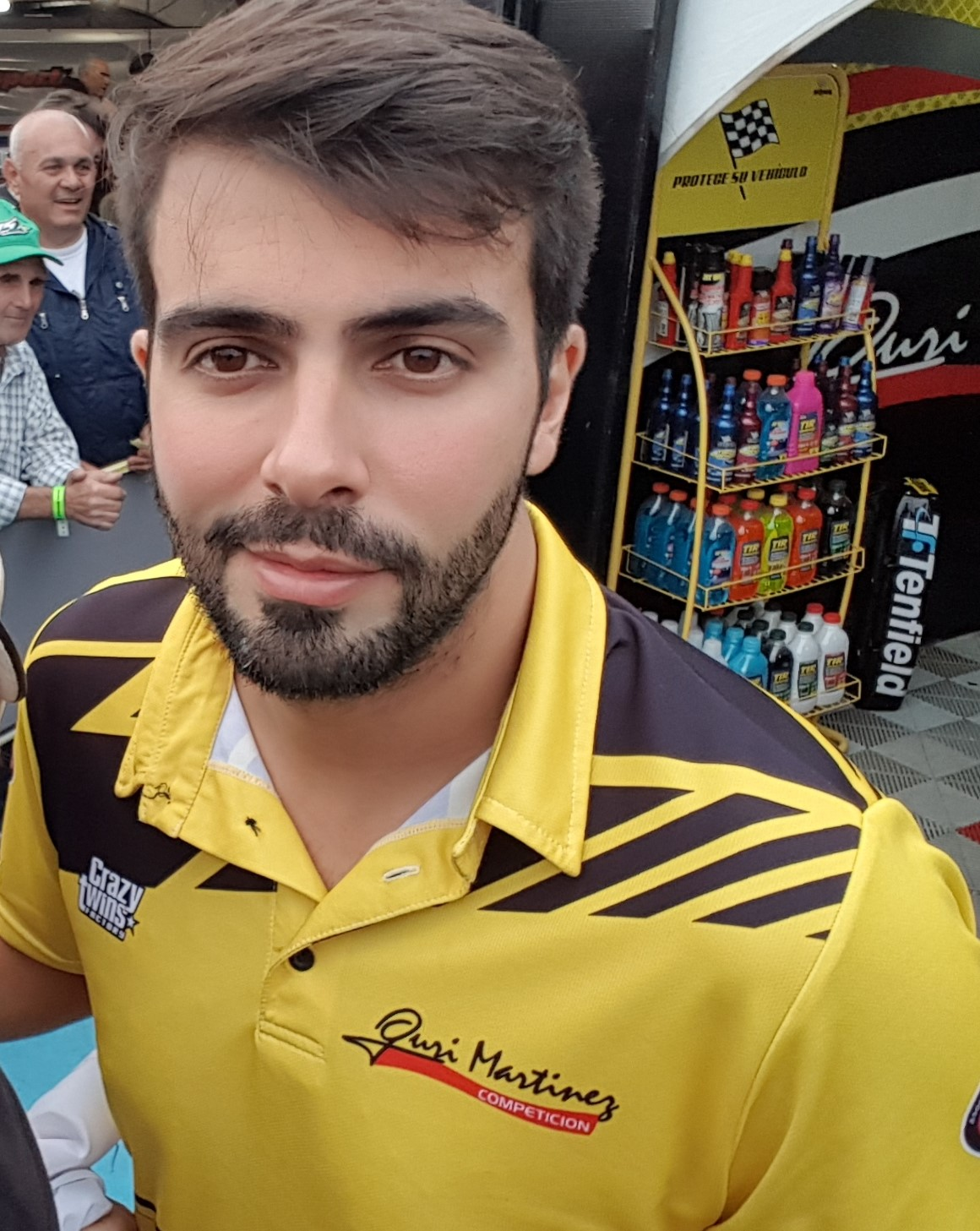
- Lambiris in 2019
- Nationality: Uruguayan
- Born: 3 March 1987 (age 39) Montevideo, Uruguay

Turismo Carretera
- Categorisation: FIA Silver
- Years active: 2015–present
- Teams: Dole Racing; Martínez Competición; LCA Racing; Alifraco Sport
- Starts: 127
- Wins: 2 (Finals); 12 (Heats)
- Poles: 3
- Fastest laps: 1
- Best finish: 2nd in 2021

Previous series
- 2004–2006 2012 2013–2014: Fórmula Renault Argentina; TC Mouras; TC Pista

Mauricio Jorge Lambiris (born 3 March 1987) is a racing driver from Uruguay. He currently competes in Turismo Carretera.

== Biography ==
Lambiris was born in Montevideo but moved to Buenos Aires at 6 years old. His first taste of motorsport came at a karting exhibition in Punta del Este through his father Jorge, an amateur driver himself. Despite his parents wanting him to play football, he started racing karts at 7 alongside childhood friend Guido Falaschi. He moved up to Fórmula 1000 Argentina in 2003 and then Fórmula Renault Argentina a year later, but struggled with the transition and returned to karting in 2007. Lambiris returned to car racing in 2010 in Turismo Libre Uruguayo, through his aunt who produced the series' television package. At the sixth round of the series he crashed and broke his leg, and sat out the rest of the season. In late-2011, he made his comeback in TC Rioplatense (on the same weekend as Falaschi's death) before stepping up to TC Mouras in 2012.

Lambiris finished eighth in his debut season on the Turismo Carretera pyramid, the highest-placed driver without a win. Two seasons in TC Pista followed, with a best of third in the championship in 2014 having won two races. He made his debut in the top class of Turismo Carretera in 2015 with Torino, qualifying for the Copa de Oro in his first season but finished at the bottom of the playoff standings – he repeated these results in 2016. He made a mid-season switch to Ford in 2017, and won his first race at the 2018 Carrera del Millón in Rafaela – making him only the second non-Argentine driver to win a race in Turismo Carretera after compatriot Héctor Suppici Sedes. Lambiris has so far qualified for the playoffs in every season of his Turismo Carretera career, and finished runner-up to Mariano Werner in 2021.

== Career results ==
=== Summary ===
| Season | Series | Position | Car | Team |
|---|---|---|---|---|
| 2004 | Fórmula Renault Argentina | 28th | Crespi–Renault | ? |
| 2005 | Fórmula Renault Argentina | 18th | Crespi–Renault | ? |
| 2006 | Fórmula Renault Argentina | 43rd | Crespi–Renault | ? |
| 2012 | TC Mouras | 8th | Ford Falcon | Alifraco Sport |
| 2013 | TC Pista | 9th | Ford Falcon | Werner Competición |
| 2014 | TC Pista | 3rd | Ford Falcon | Werner Competición |
| 2015 | Turismo Carretera | 16th | Torino Cherokee | Dole Racing |
| 2016 | Turismo Carretera | 20th | Torino Cherokee | Dole Racing |
| 2017 | Turismo Carretera | 6th | Torino Cherokee; Ford Falcon | Martínez Competición |
| 2018 | Turismo Carretera | 9th | Ford Falcon | Martínez Competición |
| 2019 | Turismo Carretera | 16th | Ford Falcon | Martínez Competición |
| 2020 | Turismo Carretera | 11th | Ford Falcon | Martínez Competición |
| 2021 | Turismo Carretera | 2nd | Ford Falcon | LCA Racing |
| 2022 | Turismo Carretera | 9th | Ford Falcon | LCA Racing |
| 2023 | Turismo Carretera | | Ford Falcon | Alifraco Sport |
