= TC Pista Mouras =

- Category: Stock cars
- Country: Argentina
- Inaugural season: 2008
- Drivers' champion: (Argentina) Tobías Martínez
- Makes' champion: Chevrolet
- Teams' champion: Las Toscas Racing
- Official website: ACTC.org.ar

TC Pista Mouras is a stock car racing series in Argentina, created in 2008. This series is the lower division of the promotion ladder of the Asociación Corredores de Turismo Carretera and was created at the expense of the TC Mouras division. The objective of the mother entity of Turismo Carretera with the creation of this new division is the training of young people and new competitors who wish to race in the first division, being admitted young drivers from karts, monoposts or zone categories. Admission to the category is not only open to young pilots, since those pilots who have gathered high experience in zonal categories, or in senior categories at the national level, can also participate.

The first champion of this category was the driver Matías Devoto, who obtained in 2008, the so-called Presentation Tournament, which was launched in the last five dates of said TC Mouras season and in which this pilot devoted himself to board the Chevrolet Chevy Malibu. The following year, the first TC Pista Mouras long tournament would be played, being its creditor, the driver Agustín Herrera, who on this occasion, gave joy to the Ford supporters aboard his Ford Falcon.

On the other hand, the other two classic brands of the TC, Dodge and Torino, also obtained titles in this division, being the year 2012 the first obtained by the brand from the hand of Nicolás Pezzucchi from Olavarrie, while in 2013, the driver Gabriel Novillo would give his first championship to Torino, a brand that once again celebrated in Argentine motorsports, after the 19 years of the last title obtained by Luis Rubén Di Palma in the extinct Supercart category.

== Champions ==
Year	Driver	Model
2008	(Argentina) Matías Devoto	Chevrolet Chevy Malibu
2009	(Argentina) Agustín Herrera	Ford Falcon
2010	(Argentina) Martín Laborda	Ford Falcon
2011	(Argentina) Nicolás Pezzucchi	Dodge Cherokee
2012	(Argentina) Augusto Carinelli	Chevrolet Chevy Malibu
2013	(Argentina) Gabriel Novillo	Torino Cherokee
2014	(Argentina) Claudio Di Noto Rama	Dodge Cherokee
2015	(Argentina) Sebastián Reynoso	Ford Falcon
2016	(Argentina) Agustín De Brabandere	Ford Falcon
2017	(Argentina) Lucas Panarotti	Dodge Cherokee
2018	(Argentina) Lucas Granja	Ford Falcon
2019	(Argentina) Matías Frano	Ford Falcon
2020	(Argentina) Tobías Martínez	Chevrolet Chevy Malibu
2021	(Argentina) Gaspar Chansard	Dodge Cherokee
2022	(Argentina) Ignacio Faín	Dodge Cherokee
2023	(Argentina) Gastón Iansa	Chevrolet Chevy Malibu
2024	(Argentina) Lucas Bohdanowicz	Dodge Cherokee
