= Germán Todino =

Racing driver from Argentina

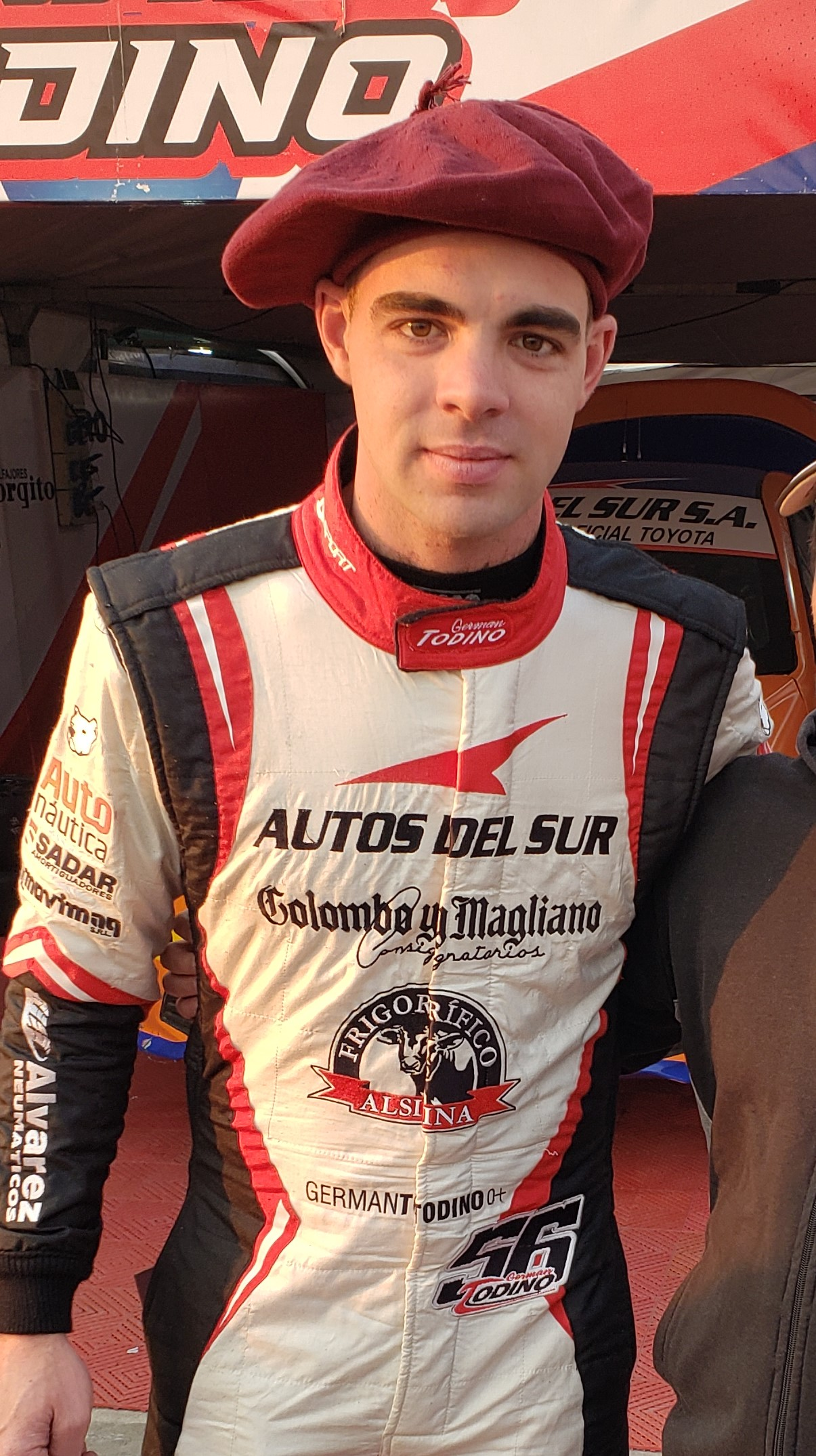
- Todino in 2022
- Nationality: Argentine
- Born: 10 August 2000 (age 26) Rivera, Buenos Aires Province

Turismo Carretera
- Years active: 2021–present
- Teams: Alifraco Sport; Maquin Parts Racing
- Starts: 47
- Wins: 6 (Finals); 7 (Heats)
- Poles: 2
- Fastest laps: 5
- Best finish: 3rd in 2023

Previous series
- 2016 2017 2018 2018, 2020–2022 2019–2020 2022–2023: Fórmula Metropolitana Argentina; TC Pista Mouras; TC Mouras; Turismo Nacional; TC Pista; TC Pick Up

Championship titles
- 2018: TC Mouras

Germán Todino (born 10 August 2000) is a racing driver from Argentina. He currently competes in Turismo Carretera.

== Career results ==
=== Summary ===
Season	Series	Position	Team	Car
2016	Fórmula Metropolitana Argentina	6th	Tati Race Team	Crespi–Renault K4M
2017	TC Pista Mouras	6th	Azul Sport Team	Ford Falcon
2018	TC Mouras	1st	Azul Sport Team	Ford Falcon
2018	Turismo Nacional – Class 3	31st	Alifraco Sport	SEAT León
2019	TC Pista	17th	Azul Sport Team	Ford Falcon
2020	TC Pista	3rd	Alifraco Sport	Torino Cherokee
2020	Turismo Nacional – Class 3	29th	Alifraco Sport	Kia Cerato
2021	Turismo Nacional – Class 3	18th	Arana Ingeniería Sport	Toyota Corolla E170
2021	Turismo Carretera	12th	Alifraco Sport	Torino Cherokee
2022	Turismo Nacional – Class 3	30th	Arana Ingeniería Sport	Toyota Corolla E170
2022	Turismo Carretera	8th	Maquin Parts Racing	Torino Cherokee
2022	TC Pick Up	58th	Alifraco Sport	Nissan Frontier
2023	Turismo Carretera	3rd	Maquin Parts Racing	Dodge Cherokee
2023	TC Pick Up	21st	Azul Sport Team	Toyota Hilux
