= Toyota Camry (Turismo Carretera) =

Argentine race car

- Category: ACTC stock car
- Constructor: Toyota
- Designer: Talleres Jakos

Technical specifications
- Engine: AMC XJ 3.21 L (195.9 cu in) OHV I6 naturally-aspirated FR
- Transmission: 6-speed sequential manual
- Weight: 1,315 kg (2,899 lb)

Competition history
- Competition: Turismo Carretera
- Notable entrants: Toyota Gazoo Racing Argentina; Maquin Parts Racing
- Notable drivers: (Argentina) Matías Rossi (Argentina) Andrés Jakos (Argentina) Esteban Gini
- Debut: 2022 Turismo Carretera Viedma round
- First win: 2023 Desafío de las Estrellas
- Last win: 2025 Turismo Carretera Posadas round

The Toyota Camry is a stock car version of the Toyota Camry XV70, designed to race in Asociación Corredores de Turismo Carretera-sanctioned series, including Turismo Carretera.

== History ==
Following several meetings between Toyota Argentina and the Asociación Corredores de Turismo Carretera that started in 2018, the Toyota Camry was confirmed as an entrant into Turismo Carretera on 13 October 2021. The XV70 model type was chosen to represent the brand, with alterations to the front and rear doors and the B-pillar to fit series regulations. Additionally, the vehicle was fitted with the AMC XJ engine, which is used in the Dodge Cherokee and Torino Cherokee.

The car made its debut with the factory team during the 2022 season. Matías Rossi scored the models' first victory in a factory team 1–2 at the 2023 Desafío de las Estrellas. In mid-2023, a third car was built by Maquin Parts Racing for Esteban Gini.

The technical regulations of Turismo Carretera were updated for 2024, allowing for the introduction of modern models. As a result, the Camry was restyled to feature its OEM nose design.
