= José Manuel Urcera =

Argentine racecar driver

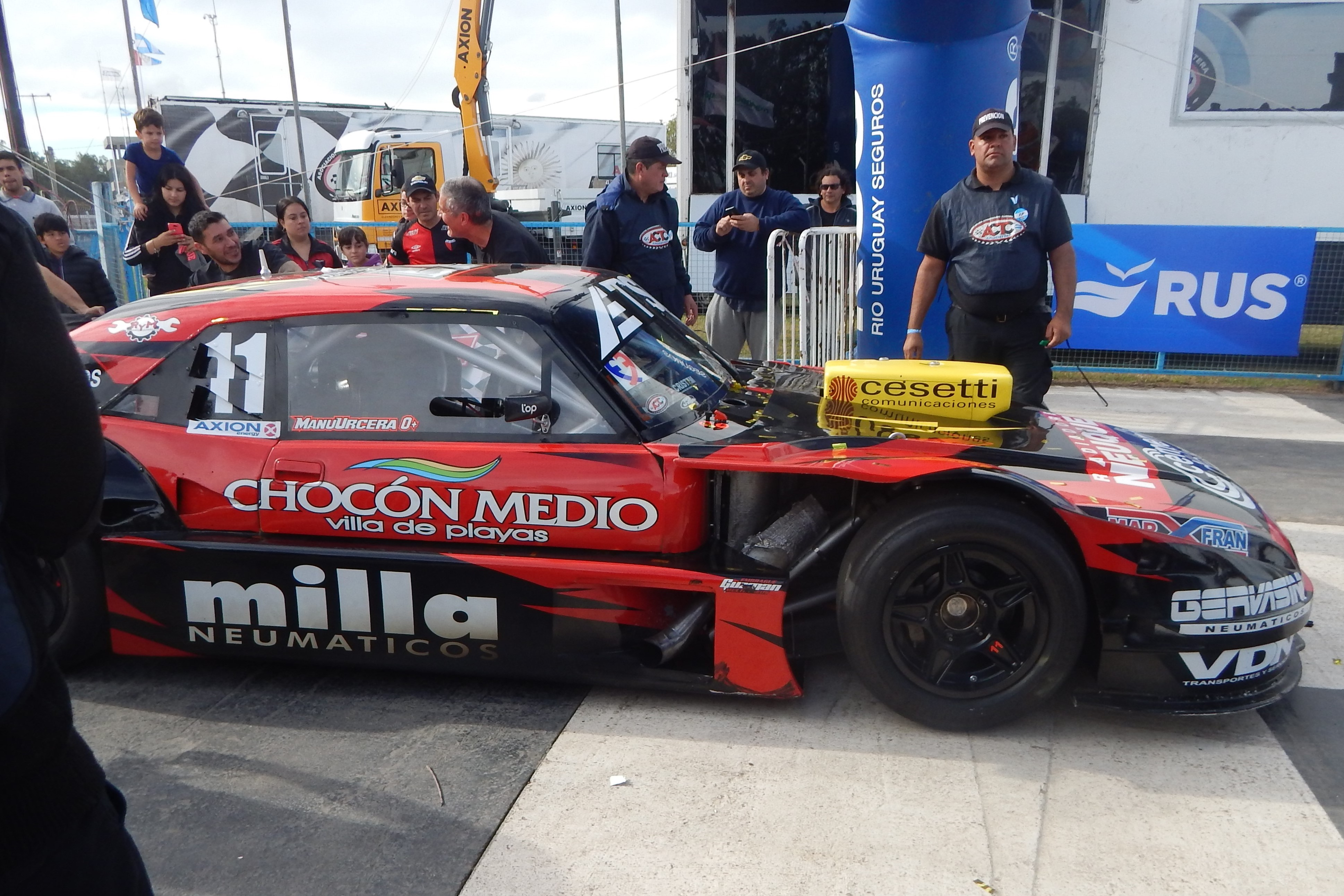
Urcera's Chevrolet TC car.

José Manuel "Manu" Urcera (San Antonio Oeste, Río Negro Province; July 9, 1991) is an Argentine motor racing driver. Won the Turismo Carretera championship in 2022.

== Racing career ==
Urcera started his motorsport career in motocross. In 2012, he debuted at TC Mouras with JP Racing and Turismo Nacional (TN) Clase 2. The next year, he made his debut at TC Pista and was vice-champion in 2014, which gave him promotion to Turismo Carretera (TC). In 2016 he debuted in Súper TC 2000 with the Fiat Argentina team.

In 2016, Urcera got his first wins in both championships. The next year, he qualified for the TC play-offs for first time and went on to the Citroën STC2000 team. In 2018 he debuted in TN Clase 3.

Urcera was the 2019 TN Clase 3 champion with a Honda Civic from the Larrauri Competición team. At the same time, he was TC vice-champion behind Agustín Canapino. In 2020, he again won the Clase 3 title, while in TC, he finished third in the championship. It was his last TC season with JP team.

In 2022, Urcera was Turismo Carretera champion competing with Maquin Parts Racing, having won two races. In addition, he competed in the Italian GT Sprint Championship alongside Daniele di Amato in a Scuderia Baldini 27's Ferrari 488 GT3 Evo 2020. They took one win.

== Racing record ==
=== Racing career summary ===
Season	Series	Team	Races	Wins	Poles	F/Laps	Podiums	Points	Position
2012	Turismo Nacional - Clase 3	Boero Carrera Pro	5	0	0	0	0	6.5	50th
2012	TC Mouras	JP Racing/ Las Toscas Racing	14	1	1	3	2	134	12th
2013	Turismo Nacional - Clase 3	GC Competición	1	0	0	0	0	-	
2013	TC Mouras	JP Racing	13	3	6	6	5	486.5	6th
2013	TC Pista	JP Racing	16	3	6	1	3	317.75	16th
2014	Top Race Series	Azar Motorsport	2	0	0	0	0	-	
2014	TC Mouras	JP Racing	11	3	3	3	6	447	7th
2014	TC Pista	JP Racing	16	3	6	1	8	537	2nd
2015	Turismo Carretera	JP Racing	15	0	0	0	0	230.75	26th
2015	Súper TC2000	Equipo Fiat Petronas	13	0	0	0	2	160	5th
2016	Turismo Carretera	Las Toscas Racing	15	1	1	0	1	412.5	18th
2016	Súper TC 2000	Fiat Petronas	14	1	4	3	3	106	10th
2017	Turismo Carretera	Las Toscas Racing	15	0	0	0	1	402.5	7th
2017	Súper TC2000	Citroën Total Racing	12	1	1	0	2	83.5	12th
2017	Top Race V6	Midas Racing Team	4	0	0	0	0	4	24th
2017	TC Mouras - Guest Tournament		1	0	0	0	0	10	40th
2017	Turismo Nacional - Clase 3		1	0	0	0	1	-	
2018	Turismo Carretera	Las Toscas Racing	15	0	0	0	1	341	11th
2018	Turismo Nacional - Clase 3	Citroën Total	10	0	2	2	2	146	9th
2018	Súper TC2000	Citroën Total Racing	18	0	0	0	0	57	12th
2019	Turismo Carretera	JP Carrera	15	1	3	3	1	523.75	2nd
2019	Turismo Nacional - Clase 3	Larrauri Competición	12	1	2	0	3	279	1st
2019	Súper TC2000	Honda Racing	13	0	0	0	0	19	15th
2020	Turismo Carretera	JP Carrera/ Las Toscas Racing	11	1	0	0	1	319	3rd
2020	Turismo Nacional - Clase 3	Larrauri Racing	8	2	4	3	4	227	1st
2020	Súper TC2000	Monti Motorsport	15	0	2	2	2	26	13th
2021	Turismo Carretera	Urcera Racing/ Alifraco Sport	14	1	1	1	1	237	24th
2021	Turismo Nacional - Clase 3	Larrauri Racing	11	1	0	0	2	209	5th
2022	Turismo Carretera	Maquin Parts Racing Team	14	2	3	3	3	675	1st
2022	Turismo Nacional - Clase 3	Larrauri Racing/ CVG Team	12	1	1	1	1	152	12th
2022	TC Pick Up	Larrauri Racing	4	0	0	0	0	82	37th
2022	Italian GT Championship - GT3	Scuderia Baldini 27	4	1	1	0	0	37	5th
2023	Turismo Carretera	Maquin Parts Racing	15	0	0	0	1	360.25	8th
2023	TC Pick Up	Maquin Parts Racing	11	0	0	0	3	336.75	8th
2023	Turismo Nacional - Clase 3	Saturni Racing	11	2	1	0	3	271	2nd

== Personal life ==
Urcera is in a relationship with the model Nicole Neumann.

Sporting positions
Preceded by Mariano Werner	Turismo Carretera champion 2022	Succeeded by Incumbent
