= Facundo Ardusso =

Argentine racing driver

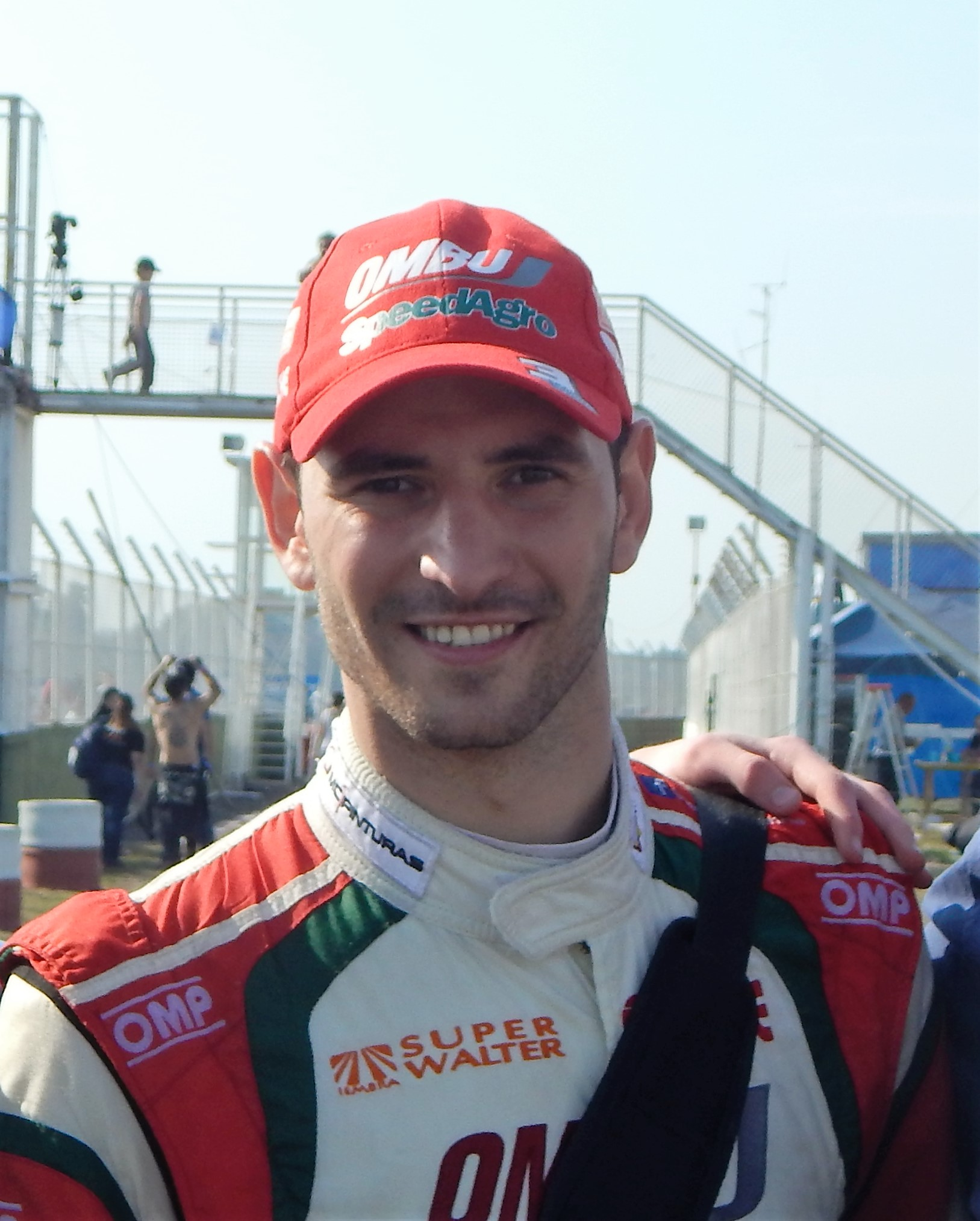
Ardusso in 2015

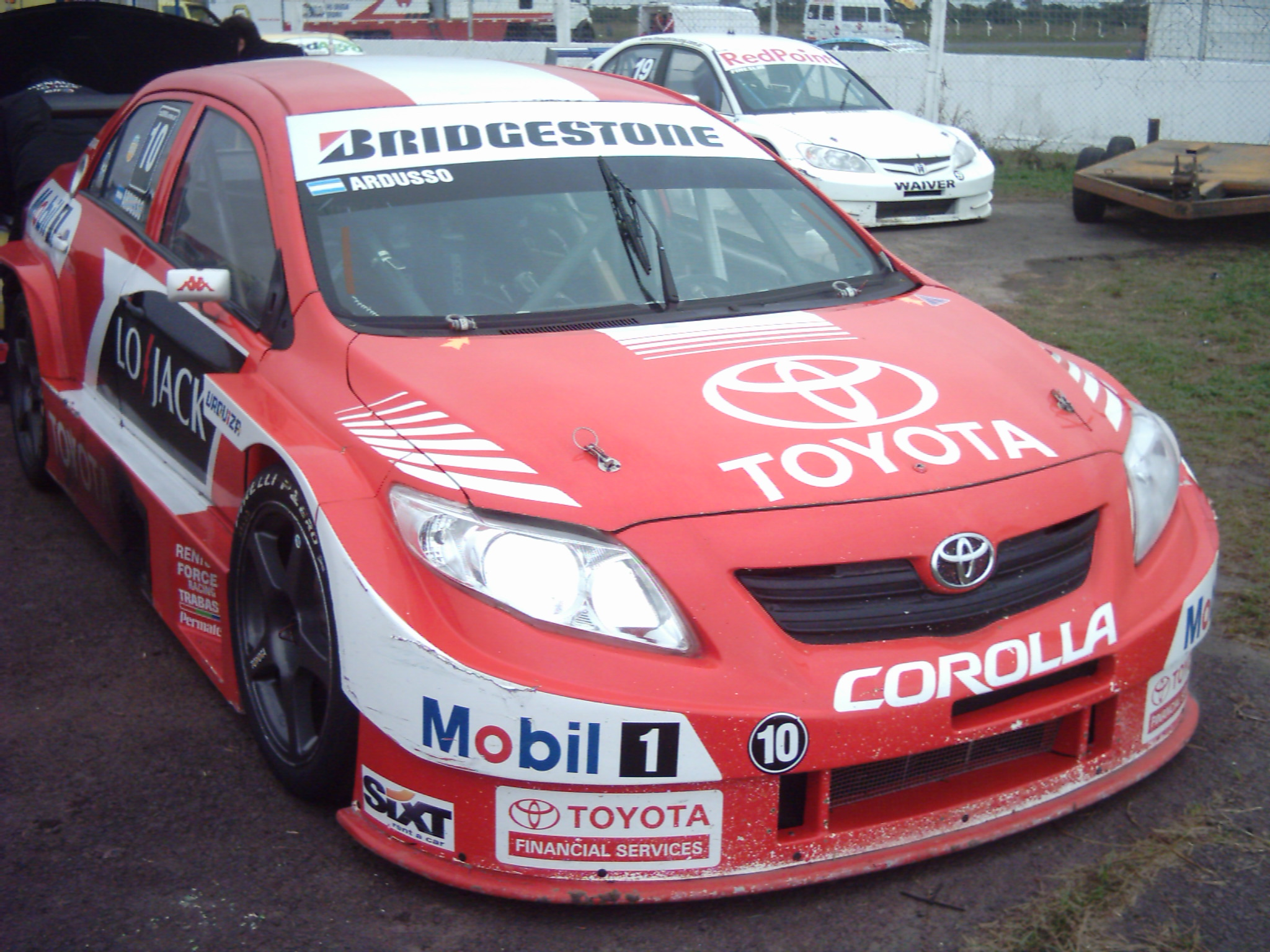
Ardusso's Toyota Corolla at the fifth round of the 2010 TC 2000 season at Autódromo Santiago Yaco Guarnieri

Facundo Ardusso (born 24 June 1988) is an Argentine racing driver. He has run in different series, with major success in Argentine Formula Renault and TC 2000. He was fourth at Punta del Este, 21 March 2010.

== Awards ==
- 2009 Revelation Clarín Awards

== Career ==
- 2006: Argentine Formula Renault (Crespi)
- 2007: Argentine Formula Renault (Crespi)
- 2008: Argentine Formula Renault (Crespi)
- 2009: Argentine Formula Renault (Crespi) Champion
- 2010: TC 2000 Toyota Team Argentina (Toyota Corolla)

Sporting positions
| Preceded by Guido Falaschi | Argentine Formula Renault Champion; 2009 | Succeeded by Nicolás Trosset |
