= Julián Santero =

Racing driver from Argentina

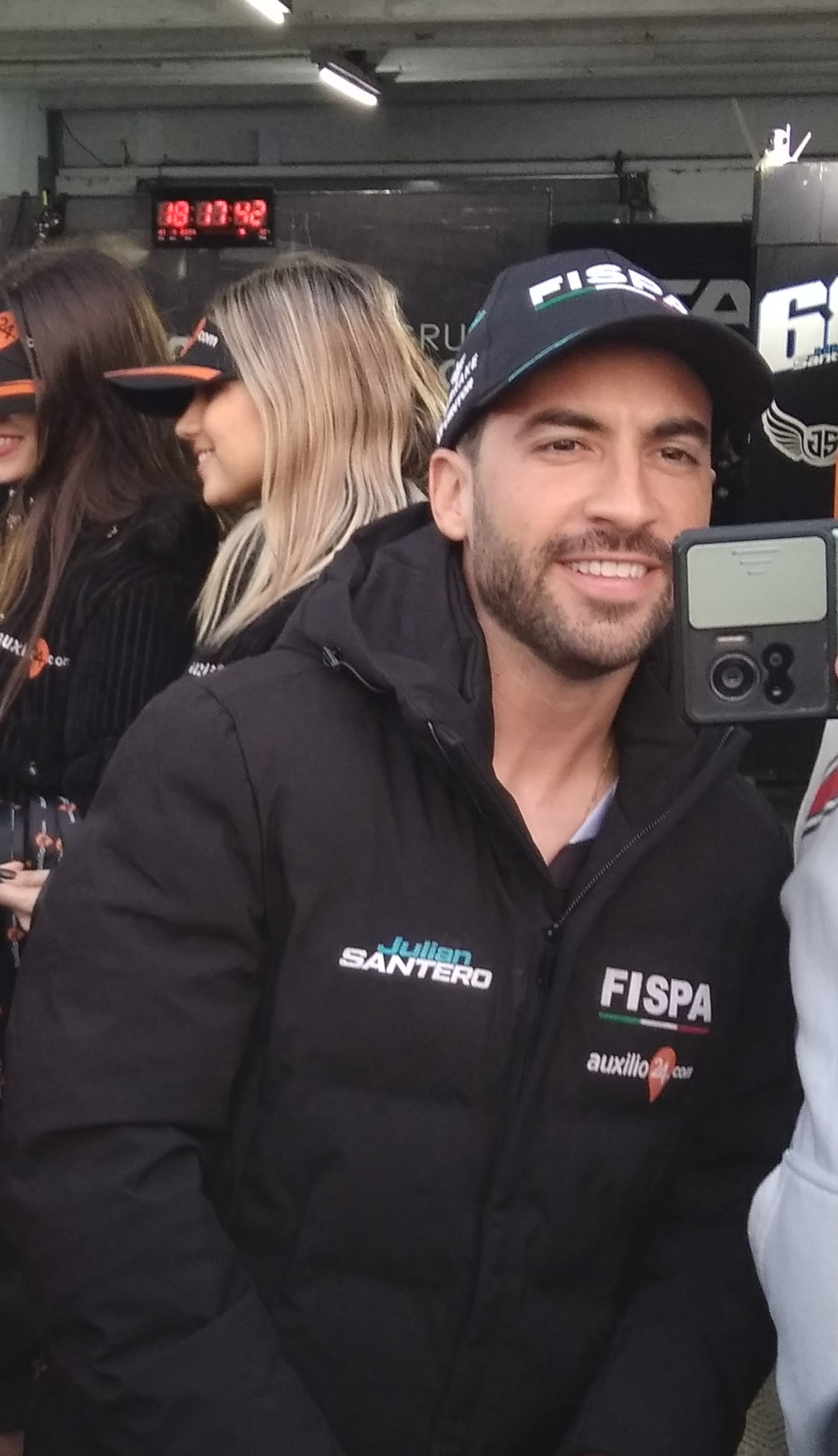
- Santero in 2024
- Nationality: Argentine
- Born: 21 October 1993 (age 33) Guaymallén, Mendoza, Argentina
- Categorisation: FIA Silver

Julián Emmanuel Santero (born October 21, 1993, in Guaymallén, Mendoza Province) is an Argentine motor racing driver. He won the Turismo Carretera championship in 2024.

== Biography ==
Santero start his career in 2008 at 14 years old, in the Chilean Formula Three Championship. In the following year, he debuted in Formula Renault Plus Argentina. He was champion in 2010, before moving on to Formula Renault Argentina, which he won in 2013. That year he was also runner-up in TC 2000, which allowed him to debut in Súper TC 2000 in 2014, with the Peugeot Argentina team.

In 2015, Santero was champion of TC Mouras and debuted in Turismo Nacional Clase 3. In 2016, he was promoted to TC Pista and made his debut in Turismo Carretera (TC) as a guest driver for Mauricio Lambiris in an endurance race.

Santero won his debut race as an official driver at TC in 2017 and added another victory that year. He won two more races in 2018 and 2020.

Santero joined Toyota Gazoo Racing Argentina in 2018 and returned to the Súper TC 2000 that year. He wonn a race for the first time in this series in 2020. That year, he was runner-up in Turismo Nacional Clase 3 with a Toyota Corolla, behind José Manuel Urcera, and was fourth in the TC championship.

In addition, he won one of the two races he raced in the Porsche GT3 Cup Trophy Argentina 2018.

In 2021, Santero competed in the opening race of the Michelin Pilot Challenge season in Daytona.
