= TC Mouras =

Argentine stock car racing series

- Category: Stock cars
- Country: Argentina
- Inaugural season: 2004
- Drivers' champion: (Argentina) Marcos Quijada (2021)
- Official website: ACTC.org.ar

TC Mouras is a stock car racing series in Argentina which is operated by the Asociación Corredores de Turismo Carretera. This series was founded in 2004 as a division of TC Pista, being called as TC Pista B and located as the opening series of Turismo Carretera. After the initial championship, won by Luis Esteban Hernández, the ACTC recategorized the TC Pista B as a school category for those drivers who wish to compete at the national level in the TC Pista, their competitions being organized mainly at the Autódromo Roberto José Mouras (La Plata). For this reason, the series was renamed TC Mouras, the name being a combination of the acronym of the higher category and the surname of the driver Roberto Mouras who gave the name to the circuit.

Between 2011 and 2018, special races were held in which each TC Mouras titular driver invited another driver, who added points for the titular driver. In turn, there was a championship for these guest drivers.

== Champions ==
Year	Driver	Car
2004	(Argentina) Luis Esteban Hernández	Ford Falcon
2005	(Argentina) Juan Bautista de Benedictis	Ford Falcon
2006	(Argentina) Federico Alonso	Chevrolet Chevy Malibu
2007	(Argentina) Mario Ferrando	Ford Falcon
2008	(Argentina) Mauro Giallombardo	Ford Falcon
2009	(Argentina) Gastón Ferrante	Ford Falcon
2010	(Argentina) Pedro Gentile	Chevrolet Chevy Malibu
2011	(Argentina) Gastón Crusitta	Chevrolet Chevy Malibu
2012	(Argentina) Juan José Ebarlín	Chevrolet Chevy Malibu
2013	(Argentina) Alan Ruggiero	Ford Falcon
2014	(Argentina) Pedro Gentile	Chevrolet Chevy Malibu
2015	(Argentina) Julián Santero	Chevrolet Chevy Malibu
2016	(Argentina) Juan Tomás Catalán Magni	Ford Falcon
2017	(Argentina) Facundo Della Motta	Chevrolet Chevy Malibu
2018	(Argentina) Germán Todino	Ford Falcon
2019	(Uruguay) Marcos Landa	Torino Cherokee
2020	(Argentina) Christian Iván Ramos	Torino Cherokee
2021	(Argentina) Marcos Quijada	Dodge Cherokee
2022	(Argentina) Rudi Bundziak	Chevrolet Chevy Malibu

=== Guest Driver Championships ===
Año	Guest driver	Title drivers	Car
2011	(Argentina) Jonatan Castellano	(Argentina) Cristian Di Scala	Dodge Cherokee
2012	(Argentina) Jonatan Castellano	(Argentina) Nicolás Pezzucchi (Argentina) Leonardo Palotini	Dodge Cherokee
2013	(Argentina) José Savino	(Argentina) William Brian Atkinson	Ford Falcon
2014	(Argentina) Mariano Werner	(Argentina) Marcos Muchiut	Ford Falcon
2015	(Argentina) Juan Bautista De Benedictis	(Argentina) Claudio Di Noto Rama	Ford Falcon
2016	(Argentina) Omar Martínez	(Argentina) Juan José Suárez	Ford Falcon
2017	(Argentina) Nicolás Pezzucchi	(Argentina) Andrés Jakos	Dodge Cherokee
2018	(Argentina) Luis José Di Palma	(Argentina) Damián Markel	Ford Falcon
