= Oscar Castellano =

Argentine racing driver (born 1948)

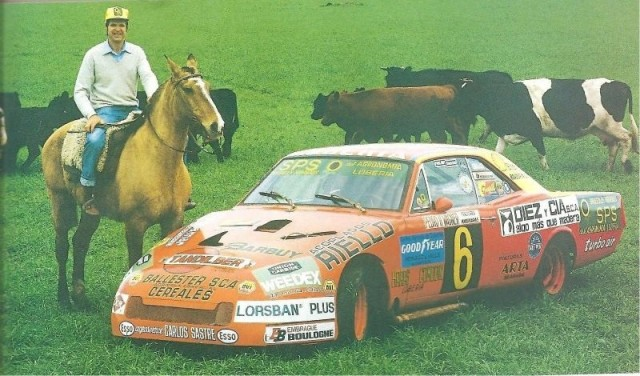
- Castellano in 1983
- Nationality: Argentine
- Born: 15 September 1948 (age 78) Lobería, Buenos Aires Province

Championship titles
- 1987, 1988, 1989: Turismo Carretera

Oscar Roberto Castellano (born September 15, 1948 in Lobería, Buenos Aires Province), is an Argentine racing driver. He won the Turismo Carretera championship in 1987, 1988 and 1989.

Castellano's son, Jonathan, is a driver in Turismo Carretera and Turismo Nacional. Together, they lead the Castellano Power Team.

Sporting positions
Preceded by Oscar Angeletti	Turismo Carretera champion 1987-1989	Succeeded by Emilio Satriano
