= Ford Falcon (Turismo Carretera) =

Argentinian race car

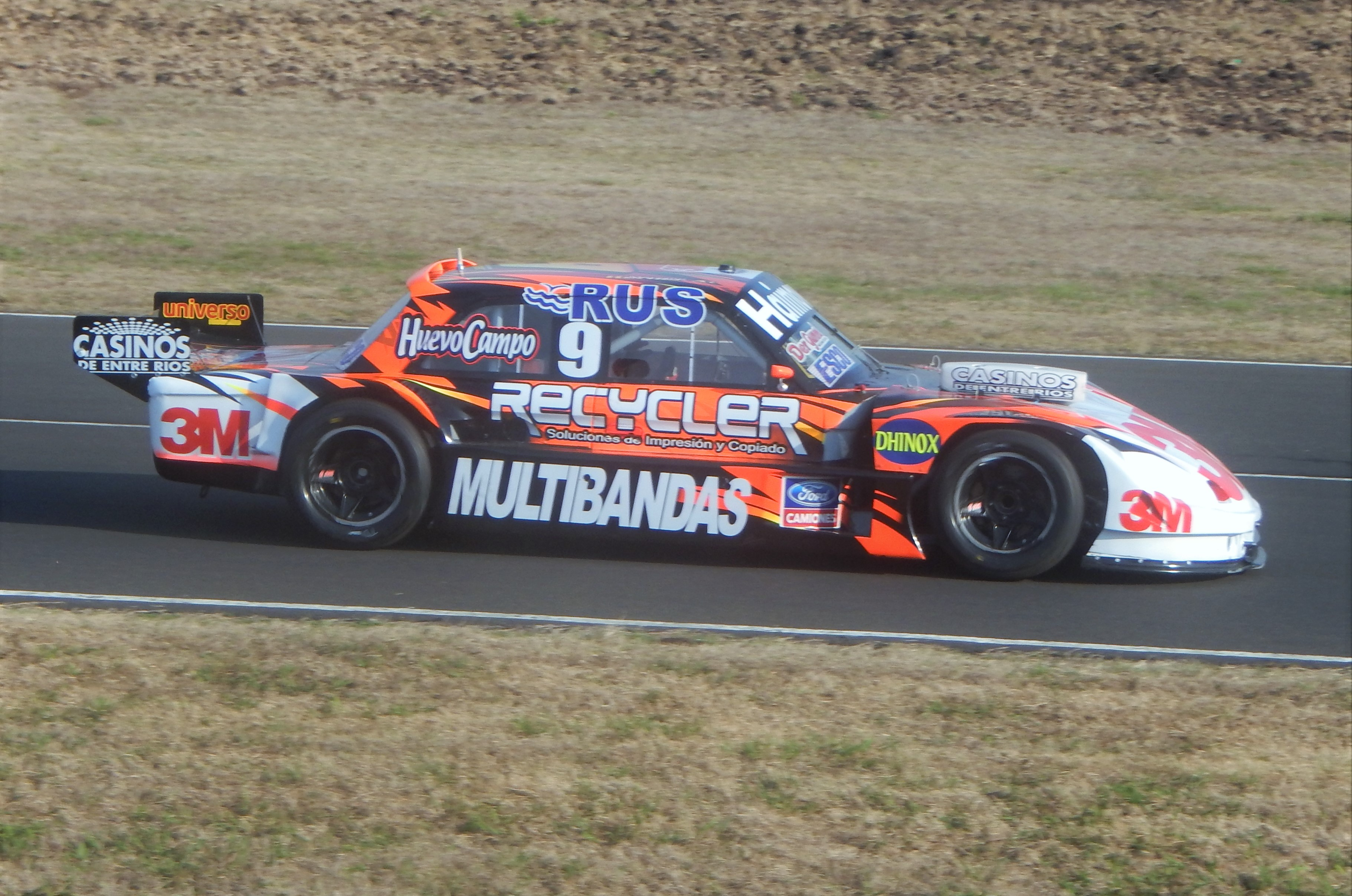
- Category: ACTC stock car
- Constructor: Ford

Technical specifications
- Suspension (front): Double wishbones, pushrod actuated coil springs over shock absorbers, anti-roll bar (Deformable parallelogram)
- Suspension (rear): Double wishbones, pushrod actuated coil springs love shock absorbers, anti-roll bar (formerly rigid axle)
- Axle track: 1,484–1,614 mm (58.4–63.5 in) (front); 2,010 mm (79.1 in) (rear)
- Wheelbase: 2,750–2,810 mm (108.3–110.6 in)
- Engine: Ford 221 cu in (3.6 L) OHV I6 naturally-aspirated FR
- Transmission: 5-speed manual
- Power: 340–500 hp (254–373 kW)
- Weight: 1,330 kg (2,932 lb)

Competition history

The Turismo Carretera version of the Ford Falcon is a stock car, based on the Ford Falcon, designed, developed, and produced since 1965.
