= 2017 6 Hours of Circuit of the Americas =

Endurance sportscar racing event in Austin, Texas

(United States) 2017 6 Hours of Circuit of the Americas
Event information
- Round 6 of 9 in the 2017 FIA World Endurance Championship
- Date: 16 September 2017
- Location: Austin, Texas
- Venue: Circuit of the Americas
- Duration: 6 Hours

Results
- Laps completed: 192
- Distance (km): 1058.496
- Distance (miles): 657.792
- LMP1

Pole position
- Time: 1:44.741
- Team: (Germany) Porsche Team

Winners
- Team: (Germany) Porsche Team
- Drivers: (Germany) Timo Bernhard (New Zealand) Earl Bamber (New Zealand) Brendon Hartley
- LMP2

Winners
- Team: (France) Signatech Alpine Matmut
- Drivers: (France) Nicolas Lapierre (United States) Gustavo Menezes (Brazil) André Negrão
- LMGTE Pro

Winners
- Team: (Italy) AF Corse
- Drivers: (United Kingdom) James Calado (Italy) Alessandro Pier Guidi
- LMGTE Am

Winners
- Team: (United Kingdom) Aston Martin Racing
- Drivers: (Canada) Paul Dalla Lana (Portugal) Pedro Lamy (Austria) Mathias Lauda

The 2017 6 Hours of Circuit of the Americas was an endurance sports car racing event held at the Circuit of the Americas, Austin, USA, on 15–17 September 2017, and served as the sixth round of the 2017 FIA World Endurance Championship season. Porsche's Timo Bernhard, Brendon Hartley and Earl Bamber won the race driving the No. 2 Porsche 919 Hybrid car, after the #1 was forced to yield to #2 under team orders.

== Qualifying ==
=== Qualifying result ===
Performance done during the qualifying session (Pole position in Class is in bold)
Pos	Class	N°	Team	Driver	Times	Grid A
**1**	**LMP1**	**1**	**(Germany) Porsche LMP Team**	**(Switzerland) Neel Jani**	**1 min 44 s 741**	**1**
2	LMP1	2	(Germany) Porsche LMP Team	(Germany) Timo Bernhard	1 min 44 s 994	2
3	LMP1	8	(Japan) Toyota Gazoo Racing	(Switzerland) Sébastien Buemi	1 min 46 s 400	3
4	LMP1	7	(Japan) Toyota Gazoo Racing	(Japan) Kamui Kobayashi	1 min 47 s 098	4
**5**	**LMP2**	**36**	**(France) Signatech Alpine Matmut**	**(France) Nicolas Lapierre**	**1 min 54 s 024**	**5**
6	LMP2	13	(Switzerland) Vaillante Rebellion	(Switzerland) Mathias Beche	1 min 54 s 275	6
7	LMP2	38	(China) Jackie Chan DC Racing	(United Kingdom) Oliver Jarvis	1 min 54 s 315	7
8	LMP2	31	(Switzerland) Vaillante Rebellion	(Brazil) Bruno Senna	1 min 54 s 394	8
9	LMP2	26	(Russia) G-Drive Racing	(United Kingdom) Alex Lynn	1 min 54 s 588	9
10	LMP2	24	(China) CEFC Manor TRS Racing	(France) Jean-Éric Vergne	1 min 55 s 186	9
11	LMP2	37	(China) Jackie Chan DC Racing	(United Kingdom) Alex Brundle	1 min 55 s 550	11
12	LMP2	28	(France) TDS Racing	(France) Matthieu Vaxiviere	1 min 55 s 831	12
**13**	**LMGTE-Pro**	**71**	**(Italy) AF Corse**	**(Italy) Davide Rigon**	**2 min 03s 057**	**13**
14	LMGTE-Pro	67	(United States) Ford Chip Ganassi Team UK	(United Kingdom) Andy Priaulx	2 min 03 s 256	14
15	LMGTE-Pro	95	(United Kingdom) Aston Martin Racing	(Denmark) Nicki Thiim	2 min 03 s 308	15
16	LMGTE-Pro	51	(Italy) AF Corse	(Italy) Alessandro Pier Guidi	2 min 03 s 553	16
17	LMGTE-Pro	66	(United States) Ford Chip Ganassi Team UK	(France) Olivier Pla	2 min 03 s 750	17
18	LMGTE-Pro	97	(United Kingdom) Aston Martin Racing	(United Kingdom) Jonathan Adam	2 min 04 s 051	18
19	LMGTE Pro	91	(Germany) Porsche GT Team	(Austria) Richard Lietz	2 min 04 s 323	19
20	LMGTE Pro	92	(Germany) Porsche GT Team	(Denmark) Michael Christensen	2 min 04 s 386	20
**21**	**LMGTE Am**	**98**	**(United Kingdom) Aston Martin Racing**	**(Portugal) Pedro Lamy**	**2 min 06 s 031**	**21**
22	LMGTE Am	54	(Switzerland) Spirit of Race	(Spain) Miguel Molina	2 min 07 s 203	22
23	LMGTE Am	61	(Singapore) Clearwater Racing	(Republic of Ireland) Matt Griffin	2 min 07 s 532	23
24	LMGTE Am	77	(Germany) Dempsey-Proton Racing	(Italy) Matteo Cairoli	2 min 08 s 126	24
25	LMGTE Am	86	(United Kingdom) Gulf Racing UK	(United Kingdom) Ben Barker	2 min 08 s 819	25
26	LMP2	25	(China) CEFC Manor TRS Racing	no times		26

== Race ==
=== Race result ===
Class winners are denoted with a yellow background.

Pos	Class	No	Team	Drivers	Chassis	Tyre	Laps	Time/Retired
Pos	Class	No	Team	Drivers	Engine	Tyre	Laps	Time/Retired
1	LMP1	2	(Germany) Porsche LMP Team	(Germany) Timo Bernhard (New Zealand) Earl Bamber (New Zealand) Brendon Hartley	Porsche 919 Hybrid	M	192	6:00:52.444
1	LMP1	2	(Germany) Porsche LMP Team	(Germany) Timo Bernhard (New Zealand) Earl Bamber (New Zealand) Brendon Hartley	Porsche 2.0 L Turbo V4	M	192	6:00:52.444
2	LMP1	1	(Germany) Porsche LMP Team	(Switzerland) Neel Jani (United Kingdom) Nick Tandy (Germany) André Lotterer	Porsche 919 Hybrid	M	192	+0.276
2	LMP1	1	(Germany) Porsche LMP Team	(Switzerland) Neel Jani (United Kingdom) Nick Tandy (Germany) André Lotterer	Porsche 2.0 L Turbo V4	M	192	+0.276
3	LMP1	8	(Japan) Toyota Gazoo Racing	(France) Stéphane Sarrazin (Switzerland) Sébastien Buemi (Japan) Kazuki Nakajima	Toyota TS050 Hybrid	M	192	+21.956
3	LMP1	8	(Japan) Toyota Gazoo Racing	(France) Stéphane Sarrazin (Switzerland) Sébastien Buemi (Japan) Kazuki Nakajima	Toyota 2.4 L Turbo V6	M	192	+21.956
4	LMP1	7	(Japan) Toyota Gazoo Racing	(United Kingdom) Mike Conway (Japan) Kamui Kobayashi (Argentina) José María López	Toyota TS050 Hybrid	M	192	+45.026
4	LMP1	7	(Japan) Toyota Gazoo Racing	(United Kingdom) Mike Conway (Japan) Kamui Kobayashi (Argentina) José María López	Toyota 2.4 L Turbo V6	M	192	+45.026
5	LMP2	36	(France) Signatech Alpine Matmut	(France) Nicolas Lapierre (United States) Gustavo Menezes (Brazil) André Negrão	Alpine A470	D	177	+15 Laps
5	LMP2	36	(France) Signatech Alpine Matmut	(France) Nicolas Lapierre (United States) Gustavo Menezes (Brazil) André Negrão	Gibson GK428 4.2 L V8	D	177	+15 Laps
6	LMP2	13	(Switzerland) Vaillante Rebellion	(Switzerland) Mathias Beche (Denmark) David Heinemeier Hansson (Brazil) Nelson Piquet Jr.	Oreca 07	D	176	+16 Laps
6	LMP2	13	(Switzerland) Vaillante Rebellion	(Switzerland) Mathias Beche (Denmark) David Heinemeier Hansson (Brazil) Nelson Piquet Jr.	Gibson GK428 4.2 L V8	D	176	+16 Laps
7	LMP2	31	(Switzerland) Vaillante Rebellion	(France) Julien Canal (France) Nicolas Prost (Brazil) Bruno Senna	Oreca 07	D	176	+16 Laps
7	LMP2	31	(Switzerland) Vaillante Rebellion	(France) Julien Canal (France) Nicolas Prost (Brazil) Bruno Senna	Gibson GK428 4.2 L V8	D	176	+16 Laps
8	LMP2	38	(China) Jackie Chan DC Racing	(Netherlands) Ho-Pin Tung (United Kingdom) Oliver Jarvis (France) Thomas Laurent	Oreca 07	D	176	+16 Laps
8	LMP2	38	(China) Jackie Chan DC Racing	(Netherlands) Ho-Pin Tung (United Kingdom) Oliver Jarvis (France) Thomas Laurent	Gibson GK428 4.2 L V8	D	176	+16 Laps
9	LMP2	37	(China) Jackie Chan DC Racing	(United States) David Cheng (United Kingdom) Alex Brundle (France) Tristan Gommendy	Oreca 07	D	175	+17 Laps
9	LMP2	37	(China) Jackie Chan DC Racing	(United States) David Cheng (United Kingdom) Alex Brundle (France) Tristan Gommendy	Gibson GK428 4.2 L V8	D	175	+17 Laps
10	LMP2	24	(China) CEFC Manor TRS Racing	(United Kingdom) Matt Rao (United Kingdom) Ben Hanley (France) Jean-Éric Vergne	Oreca 07	D	175	+17 Laps
10	LMP2	24	(China) CEFC Manor TRS Racing	(United Kingdom) Matt Rao (United Kingdom) Ben Hanley (France) Jean-Éric Vergne	Gibson GK428 4.2 L V8	D	175	+17 Laps
11	LMP2	28	(France) TDS Racing	(France) François Perrodo (France) Matthieu Vaxiviere (France) Emmanuel Collard	Oreca 07	D	174	+18 Laps
11	LMP2	28	(France) TDS Racing	(France) François Perrodo (France) Matthieu Vaxiviere (France) Emmanuel Collard	Gibson GK428 4.2 L V8	D	174	+18 Laps
12	LMP2	26	(Russia) G-Drive Racing	(Russia) Roman Rusinov (France) Pierre Thiriet (United Kingdom) Alex Lynn	Oreca 07	D	168	+24 Laps
12	LMP2	26	(Russia) G-Drive Racing	(Russia) Roman Rusinov (France) Pierre Thiriet (United Kingdom) Alex Lynn	Gibson GK428 4.2 L V8	D	168	+24 Laps
13	LMGTE; Pro	51	(Italy) AF Corse	(United Kingdom) James Calado (Italy) Alessandro Pier Guidi	Ferrari 488 GTE	M	167	+25 Laps
13	LMGTE; Pro	51	(Italy) AF Corse	(United Kingdom) James Calado (Italy) Alessandro Pier Guidi	Ferrari F154CB 3.9 L Turbo V8	M	167	+25 Laps
14	LMGTE; Pro	92	(Germany) Porsche GT Team	(Denmark) Michael Christensen (France) Kévin Estre	Porsche 911 RSR	M	167	+25 Laps
14	LMGTE; Pro	92	(Germany) Porsche GT Team	(Denmark) Michael Christensen (France) Kévin Estre	Porsche 4.0 L Flat-6	M	167	+25 Laps
15	LMGTE; Pro	71	(Italy) AF Corse	(Italy) Davide Rigon (United Kingdom) Sam Bird	Ferrari 488 GTE	M	167	+25 Laps
15	LMGTE; Pro	71	(Italy) AF Corse	(Italy) Davide Rigon (United Kingdom) Sam Bird	Ferrari F154CB 3.9 L Turbo V8	M	167	+25 Laps
16	LMGTE; Pro	95	(United Kingdom) Aston Martin Racing	(Denmark) Nicki Thiim (Denmark) Marco Sørensen	Aston Martin V8 Vantage GTE	D	167	+25 Laps
16	LMGTE; Pro	95	(United Kingdom) Aston Martin Racing	(Denmark) Nicki Thiim (Denmark) Marco Sørensen	Aston Martin 4.5 L V8	D	167	+25 Laps
17	LMGTE; Pro	97	(United Kingdom) Aston Martin Racing	(United Kingdom) Darren Turner (United Kingdom) Jonathan Adam (Brazil) Daniel Serra	Aston Martin V8 Vantage GTE	D	167	+25 Laps
17	LMGTE; Pro	97	(United Kingdom) Aston Martin Racing	(United Kingdom) Darren Turner (United Kingdom) Jonathan Adam (Brazil) Daniel Serra	Aston Martin 4.5 L V8	D	167	+25 Laps
18	LMGTE; Pro	91	(Germany) Porsche GT Team	(Austria) Richard Lietz (France) Frédéric Makowiecki	Porsche 911 RSR	M	166	+26 Laps
18	LMGTE; Pro	91	(Germany) Porsche GT Team	(Austria) Richard Lietz (France) Frédéric Makowiecki	Porsche 4.0 L Flat-6	M	166	+26 Laps
19	LMGTE; Pro	67	(United States) Ford Chip Ganassi Team UK	(United Kingdom) Andy Priaulx (United Kingdom) Harry Tincknell	Ford GT	M	166	+26 Laps
19	LMGTE; Pro	67	(United States) Ford Chip Ganassi Team UK	(United Kingdom) Andy Priaulx (United Kingdom) Harry Tincknell	Ford EcoBoost 3.5 L Turbo V6	M	166	+26 Laps
20	LMGTE; Pro	66	(United States) Ford Chip Ganassi Team UK	(Germany) Stefan Mücke (France) Olivier Pla	Ford GT	M	166	+26 Laps
20	LMGTE; Pro	66	(United States) Ford Chip Ganassi Team UK	(Germany) Stefan Mücke (France) Olivier Pla	Ford EcoBoost 3.5 L Turbo V6	M	166	+26 Laps
21	LMGTE; Am	98	(United Kingdom) Aston Martin Racing	(Canada) Paul Dalla Lana (Portugal) Pedro Lamy (Austria) Mathias Lauda	Aston Martin V8 Vantage GTE	D	162	+30 Laps
21	LMGTE; Am	98	(United Kingdom) Aston Martin Racing	(Canada) Paul Dalla Lana (Portugal) Pedro Lamy (Austria) Mathias Lauda	Aston Martin 4.5 L V8	D	162	+30 Laps
22	LMGTE; Am	61	(Singapore) Clearwater Racing	(Singapore) Weng Sun Mok (Japan) Keita Sawa (Republic of Ireland) Matt Griffin	Ferrari 488 GTE	M	162	+30 Laps
22	LMGTE; Am	61	(Singapore) Clearwater Racing	(Singapore) Weng Sun Mok (Japan) Keita Sawa (Republic of Ireland) Matt Griffin	Ferrari F154CB 3.9 L Turbo V8	M	162	+30 Laps
23	LMGTE; Am	54	(Switzerland) Spirit of Race	(Switzerland) Thomas Flohr (Italy) Francesco Castellacci (Spain) Miguel Molina	Ferrari 488 GTE	M	159	+33 Laps
23	LMGTE; Am	54	(Switzerland) Spirit of Race	(Switzerland) Thomas Flohr (Italy) Francesco Castellacci (Spain) Miguel Molina	Ferrari F154CB 3.9 L Turbo V8	M	159	+33 Laps
24	LMGTE; Am	77	(Germany) Dempsey-Proton Racing	(Germany) Christian Ried (Italy) Matteo Cairoli (Germany) Marvin Dienst	Porsche 911 RSR	D	148	+44 Laps
24	LMGTE; Am	77	(Germany) Dempsey-Proton Racing	(Germany) Christian Ried (Italy) Matteo Cairoli (Germany) Marvin Dienst	Porsche 4.0 L Flat-6	D	148	+44 Laps
DNF	LMGTE; Am	86	(United Kingdom) Gulf Racing UK	(United Kingdom) Michael Wainwright (United Kingdom) Ben Barker (Australia) Nick Foster	Porsche 911 RSR	D	92	
DNF	LMGTE; Am	86	(United Kingdom) Gulf Racing UK	(United Kingdom) Michael Wainwright (United Kingdom) Ben Barker (Australia) Nick Foster	Porsche 4.0 L Flat-6	D	92	
DNF	LMP2	25	(China) CEFC Manor TRS Racing	(Mexico) Roberto González (Switzerland) Simon Trummer (Russia) Vitaly Petrov	Oreca 07	D	51	
DNF	LMP2	25	(China) CEFC Manor TRS Racing	(Mexico) Roberto González (Switzerland) Simon Trummer (Russia) Vitaly Petrov	Gibson GK428 4.2 L V8	D	51	
