= 2017 6 Hours of Fuji =

Sports car endurance race held at Fuji Speedway, Oyama, Japan

Track map of Fuji Speedway

The 2017 6 Hours of Fuji was an endurance sports car racing event held at the Fuji Speedway, Oyama, Japan on 13–15 October 2017, and served as the seventh race of the 2017 FIA World Endurance Championship. Toyota TS050 Hybrid's Anthony Davidson, Sébastien Buemi and Kazuki Nakajima won the race driving the No. 8 Toyota Gazoo Racing car.

== Qualifying ==
=== Qualifying result ===
Performance done during the qualifying session (Pole position in Class is in bold)
Pos	Class	N°	Team	Driver	Times	Grid A
**1**	**LMP1**	**2**	**(Germany) Porsche LMP Team**	**(New Zealand) Brendon Hartley**	**1 min 35 s 160**	**1**
2	LMP1	1	(Germany) Porsche LMP Team	(United Kingdom) Nick Tandy	1 min 35 s 231	2
3	LMP1	8	(Japan) Toyota Gazoo Racing	(Japan) Kazuki Nakajima	1 min 35 s 355	3
4	LMP1	7	(Japan) Toyota Gazoo Racing	(Japan) Kamui Kobayashi	1 min 36 s 630	4
**5**	**LMP2**	**13**	**(Switzerland) Vaillante Rebellion**	**(Brazil) Nelson Piquet Jr.**	**1 min 44 s 196**	**5**
6	LMP2	31	(Switzerland) Vaillante Rebellion	(Brazil) Bruno Senna	1 min 44 s 925	6
7	LMP2	38	(China) Jackie Chan DC Racing	(Netherlands) Ho-Pin Tung	1 min 45 s 078	7
8	LMP2	36	(France) Signatech Alpine Matmut	(Brazil) André Negrão	1 min 45 s 927	8
9	LMP2	37	(China) Jackie Chan DC Racing	(United Kingdom) Alex Brundle	1 min 46 s 109	9
10	LMP2	26	(Russia) G-Drive Racing	(Russia) Roman Rusinov	1 min 46 s 205	10
11	LMP2	25	(China) CEFC Manor TRS Racing	(Russia) Vitaly Petrov	1 min 47 s 354	11
12	LMP2	24	(China) CEFC Manor TRS Racing	(United Kingdom) Matt Rao	1 min 47 s 411	12
**13**	**LMGTE Pro**	**91**	**(Germany) Porsche GT Team**	**(France) Frédéric Makowiecki**	**1 min 47s 577**	**13**
14	LMP2	28	(France) TDS Racing	(France) François Perrodo	1 min 47 s 989	14
15	LMGTE Pro	67	(United States) Ford Chip Ganassi Team UK	(United Kingdom) Harry Tincknell	1 min 48 s 018	15
16	LMGTE Pro	66	(United States) Ford Chip Ganassi Team UK	(Germany) Stefan Mücke	1 min 48 s 139	16
17	LMGTE Pro	71	(Italy) AF Corse	(United Kingdom) Sam Bird	1 min 48 s 195	17
18	LMGTE Pro	92	(Germany) Porsche GT Team	(France) Kévin Estre	1 min 48 s 265	18
19	LMGTE Pro	95	(United Kingdom) Aston Martin Racing	(Denmark) Marco Sørensen	1 min 48 s 578	19
20	LMGTE Pro	51	(Italy) AF Corse	(United Kingdom) James Calado	1 min 48 s 702	20
21	LMGTE Pro	97	(United Kingdom) Aston Martin Racing	(United Kingdom) Jonathan Adam	1 min 49 s 125	21
**22**	**LMGTE Am**	**61**	**(Singapore) Clearwater Racing**	**(Republic of Ireland) Matt Griffin**	**1 min 49 s 408**	**22**
23	LMGTE Am	77	(Germany) Dempsey-Proton Racing	(Italy) Matteo Cairoli	1 min 49 s 734	23
24	LMGTE Am	98	(United Kingdom) Aston Martin Racing	(Portugal) Pedro Lamy	1 min 49 s 784	24
25	LMGTE Am	86	(United Kingdom) Gulf Racing UK	(United Kingdom) Ben Barker	1 min 49 s 866	25
26	LMGTE Am	54	(Switzerland) Spirit of Race	(Switzerland) Thomas Flohr	1 min 50 s 797	26

== Race ==
=== Race result ===
Class winners are denoted with a yellow background.

Pos	Class	No	Team	Drivers	Chassis	Tyre	Laps	Time/retired
Pos	Class	No	Team	Drivers	Engine	Tyre	Laps	Time/retired
1	LMP1	8	(Japan) Toyota Gazoo Racing	(United Kingdom) Anthony Davidson (Switzerland) Sébastien Buemi (Japan) Kazuki Nakajima	Toyota TS050 Hybrid	MI	113	4:24:50.950
1	LMP1	8	(Japan) Toyota Gazoo Racing	(United Kingdom) Anthony Davidson (Switzerland) Sébastien Buemi (Japan) Kazuki Nakajima	Toyota 2.4 L Turbo V6	MI	113	4:24:50.950
2	LMP1	7	(Japan) Toyota Gazoo Racing	(United Kingdom) Mike Conway (Japan) Kamui Kobayashi (Argentina) José María López	Toyota TS050 Hybrid	MI	113	+1.498
2	LMP1	7	(Japan) Toyota Gazoo Racing	(United Kingdom) Mike Conway (Japan) Kamui Kobayashi (Argentina) José María López	Toyota 2.4 L Turbo V6	MI	113	+1.498
3	LMP1	1	(Germany) Porsche LMP Team	(Switzerland) Neel Jani (United Kingdom) Nick Tandy (Germany) André Lotterer	Porsche 919 Hybrid	MI	113	+2.272
3	LMP1	1	(Germany) Porsche LMP Team	(Switzerland) Neel Jani (United Kingdom) Nick Tandy (Germany) André Lotterer	Porsche 2.0 L Turbo V4	MI	113	+2.272
4	LMP1	2	(Germany) Porsche LMP Team	(Germany) Timo Bernhard (New Zealand) Earl Bamber (New Zealand) Brendon Hartley	Porsche 919 Hybrid	MI	112	+1 Lap
4	LMP1	2	(Germany) Porsche LMP Team	(Germany) Timo Bernhard (New Zealand) Earl Bamber (New Zealand) Brendon Hartley	Porsche 2.0 L Turbo V4	MI	112	+1 Lap
5	LMP2	31	(Switzerland) Vaillante Rebellion	(France) Julien Canal (France) Nicolas Prost (Brazil) Bruno Senna	Oreca 07	D	110	+3 Laps
5	LMP2	31	(Switzerland) Vaillante Rebellion	(France) Julien Canal (France) Nicolas Prost (Brazil) Bruno Senna	Gibson GK428 4.2 L V8	D	110	+3 Laps
6	LMP2	36	(France) Signatech Alpine Matmut	(France) Nicolas Lapierre (United States) Gustavo Menezes (Brazil) André Negrão	Alpine A470	D	110	+3 Laps
6	LMP2	36	(France) Signatech Alpine Matmut	(France) Nicolas Lapierre (United States) Gustavo Menezes (Brazil) André Negrão	Gibson GK428 4.2 L V8	D	110	+3 Laps
7	LMP2	38	(China) Jackie Chan DC Racing	(China) Ho-Pin Tung (United Kingdom) Oliver Jarvis (France) Thomas Laurent	Oreca 07	D	110	+3 Laps
7	LMP2	38	(China) Jackie Chan DC Racing	(China) Ho-Pin Tung (United Kingdom) Oliver Jarvis (France) Thomas Laurent	Gibson GK428 4.2 L V8	D	110	+3 Laps
8	LMP2	28	(France) TDS Racing	(France) François Perrodo (France) Matthieu Vaxiviere (France) Emmanuel Collard	Oreca 07	D	110	+3 Laps
8	LMP2	28	(France) TDS Racing	(France) François Perrodo (France) Matthieu Vaxiviere (France) Emmanuel Collard	Gibson GK428 4.2 L V8	D	110	+3 Laps
9	LMP2	24	(China) CEFC Manor TRS Racing	(United Kingdom) Matt Rao (United Kingdom) Ben Hanley (France) Jean-Éric Vergne	Oreca 07	D	110	+3 Laps
9	LMP2	24	(China) CEFC Manor TRS Racing	(United Kingdom) Matt Rao (United Kingdom) Ben Hanley (France) Jean-Éric Vergne	Gibson GK428 4.2 L V8	D	110	+3 Laps
10	LMP2	26	(Russia) G-Drive Racing	(Russia) Roman Rusinov (France) Pierre Thiriet (United Kingdom) James Rossiter	Oreca 07	D	110	+3 Laps
10	LMP2	26	(Russia) G-Drive Racing	(Russia) Roman Rusinov (France) Pierre Thiriet (United Kingdom) James Rossiter	Gibson GK428 4.2 L V8	D	110	+3 Laps
11	LMGTE; Pro	51	(Italy) AF Corse	(United Kingdom) James Calado (Italy) Alessandro Pier Guidi	Ferrari 488 GTE	MI	109	+4 Laps
11	LMGTE; Pro	51	(Italy) AF Corse	(United Kingdom) James Calado (Italy) Alessandro Pier Guidi	Ferrari F154CB 3.9 L Turbo V8	MI	109	+4 Laps
12	LMGTE; Pro	91	(Germany) Porsche GT Team	(Austria) Richard Lietz (France) Frédéric Makowiecki	Porsche 911 RSR	MI	109	+4 Laps
12	LMGTE; Pro	91	(Germany) Porsche GT Team	(Austria) Richard Lietz (France) Frédéric Makowiecki	Porsche 4.0 L Flat-6	MI	109	+4 Laps
13	LMP2	25	(China) CEFC Manor TRS Racing	(Mexico) Roberto González (Switzerland) Simon Trummer (Russia) Vitaly Petrov	Oreca 07	D	109	+4 Laps
13	LMP2	25	(China) CEFC Manor TRS Racing	(Mexico) Roberto González (Switzerland) Simon Trummer (Russia) Vitaly Petrov	Gibson GK428 4.2 L V8	D	109	+4 Laps
14	LMGTE; Pro	92	(Germany) Porsche GT Team	(Denmark) Michael Christensen (France) Kévin Estre	Porsche 911 RSR	MI	109	+4 Laps
14	LMGTE; Pro	92	(Germany) Porsche GT Team	(Denmark) Michael Christensen (France) Kévin Estre	Porsche 4.0 L Flat-6	MI	109	+4 Laps
15	LMGTE; Pro	66	(United States) Ford Chip Ganassi Team UK	(Germany) Stefan Mücke (France) Olivier Pla	Ford GT	MI	109	+4 Laps
15	LMGTE; Pro	66	(United States) Ford Chip Ganassi Team UK	(Germany) Stefan Mücke (France) Olivier Pla	Ford EcoBoost 3.5 L Turbo V6	MI	109	+4 Laps
16	LMGTE; Pro	71	(Italy) AF Corse	(Italy) Davide Rigon (United Kingdom) Sam Bird	Ferrari 488 GTE	MI	109	+4 Laps
16	LMGTE; Pro	71	(Italy) AF Corse	(Italy) Davide Rigon (United Kingdom) Sam Bird	Ferrari F154CB 3.9 L Turbo V8	MI	109	+4 Laps
17	LMGTE; Pro	97	(United Kingdom) Aston Martin Racing	(United Kingdom) Darren Turner (United Kingdom) Jonathan Adam	Aston Martin V8 Vantage GTE	D	109	+4 Laps
17	LMGTE; Pro	97	(United Kingdom) Aston Martin Racing	(United Kingdom) Darren Turner (United Kingdom) Jonathan Adam	Aston Martin 4.5 L V8	D	109	+4 Laps
18	LMGTE; Pro	95	(United Kingdom) Aston Martin Racing	(Denmark) Nicki Thiim (Denmark) Marco Sørensen	Aston Martin V8 Vantage GTE	D	108	+5 Laps
18	LMGTE; Pro	95	(United Kingdom) Aston Martin Racing	(Denmark) Nicki Thiim (Denmark) Marco Sørensen	Aston Martin 4.5 L V8	D	108	+5 Laps
19	LMGTE; Am	54	(Switzerland) Spirit of Race	(Switzerland) Thomas Flohr (Italy) Francesco Castellacci (Spain) Miguel Molina	Ferrari 488 GTE	MI	107	+6 Laps
19	LMGTE; Am	54	(Switzerland) Spirit of Race	(Switzerland) Thomas Flohr (Italy) Francesco Castellacci (Spain) Miguel Molina	Ferrari F154CB 3.9 L Turbo V8	MI	107	+6 Laps
20	LMGTE; Am	61	(Singapore) Clearwater Racing	(Singapore) Weng Sun Mok (Japan) Keita Sawa (Republic of Ireland) Matt Griffin	Ferrari 488 GTE	MI	107	+6 Laps
20	LMGTE; Am	61	(Singapore) Clearwater Racing	(Singapore) Weng Sun Mok (Japan) Keita Sawa (Republic of Ireland) Matt Griffin	Ferrari F154CB 3.9 L Turbo V8	MI	107	+6 Laps
21	LMGTE; Am	77	(Germany) Dempsey-Proton Racing	(Germany) Christian Ried (Italy) Matteo Cairoli (Germany) Marvin Dienst	Porsche 911 RSR	D	107	+6 Laps
21	LMGTE; Am	77	(Germany) Dempsey-Proton Racing	(Germany) Christian Ried (Italy) Matteo Cairoli (Germany) Marvin Dienst	Porsche 4.0 L Flat-6	D	107	+6 Laps
22	LMGTE; Am	86	(United Kingdom) Gulf Racing UK	(United States) Mike Hedlund (United Kingdom) Ben Barker (Australia) Nick Foster	Porsche 911 RSR	D	106	+7 Laps
22	LMGTE; Am	86	(United Kingdom) Gulf Racing UK	(United States) Mike Hedlund (United Kingdom) Ben Barker (Australia) Nick Foster	Porsche 4.0 L Flat-6	D	106	+7 Laps
23	LMGTE; Am	98	(United Kingdom) Aston Martin Racing	(Canada) Paul Dalla Lana (Portugal) Pedro Lamy (Austria) Mathias Lauda	Aston Martin V8 Vantage GTE	D	105	+8 Laps
23	LMGTE; Am	98	(United Kingdom) Aston Martin Racing	(Canada) Paul Dalla Lana (Portugal) Pedro Lamy (Austria) Mathias Lauda	Aston Martin 4.5 L V8	D	105	+8 Laps
24	LMGTE; Pro	67	(United States) Ford Chip Ganassi Team UK	(United Kingdom) Andy Priaulx (United Kingdom) Harry Tincknell	Ford GT	MI	96	+17 Laps
24	LMGTE; Pro	67	(United States) Ford Chip Ganassi Team UK	(United Kingdom) Andy Priaulx (United Kingdom) Harry Tincknell	Ford EcoBoost 3.5 L Turbo V6	MI	96	+17 Laps
DNF	LMP2	37	(China) Jackie Chan DC Racing	(China) David Cheng (United Kingdom) Alex Brundle (France) Tristan Gommendy	Oreca 07	D	52	did not finish
DNF	LMP2	37	(China) Jackie Chan DC Racing	(China) David Cheng (United Kingdom) Alex Brundle (France) Tristan Gommendy	Gibson GK428 4.2 L V8	D	52	did not finish
DSQ	LMP2	13	(Switzerland) Vaillante Rebellion	(Switzerland) Mathias Beche (Denmark) David Heinemeier Hansson (Brazil) Nelson Piquet Jr.	Oreca 07	D	85	disqualified
DSQ	LMP2	13	(Switzerland) Vaillante Rebellion	(Switzerland) Mathias Beche (Denmark) David Heinemeier Hansson (Brazil) Nelson Piquet Jr.	Gibson GK428 4.2 L V8	D	85	disqualified
