= 2017 FIA World Endurance Championship =

Auto racing series

- Organizer: Fédération Internationale de l'Automobile; Automobile Club de l'Ouest
- Discipline: Sports car endurance racing
- Number of races: 9

Champions
- LMP1 Manufacturer: (Germany) Porsche
- GTE Manufacturer: (Italy) Ferrari
- LMP2 Team: (Switzerland) Vaillante Rebellion
- LMGTE Pro Team: (Italy) AF Corse
- LMGTE Am Team: (United Kingdom) Aston Martin Racing

FIA World Endurance Championship
- ← 2016 2018–19 →

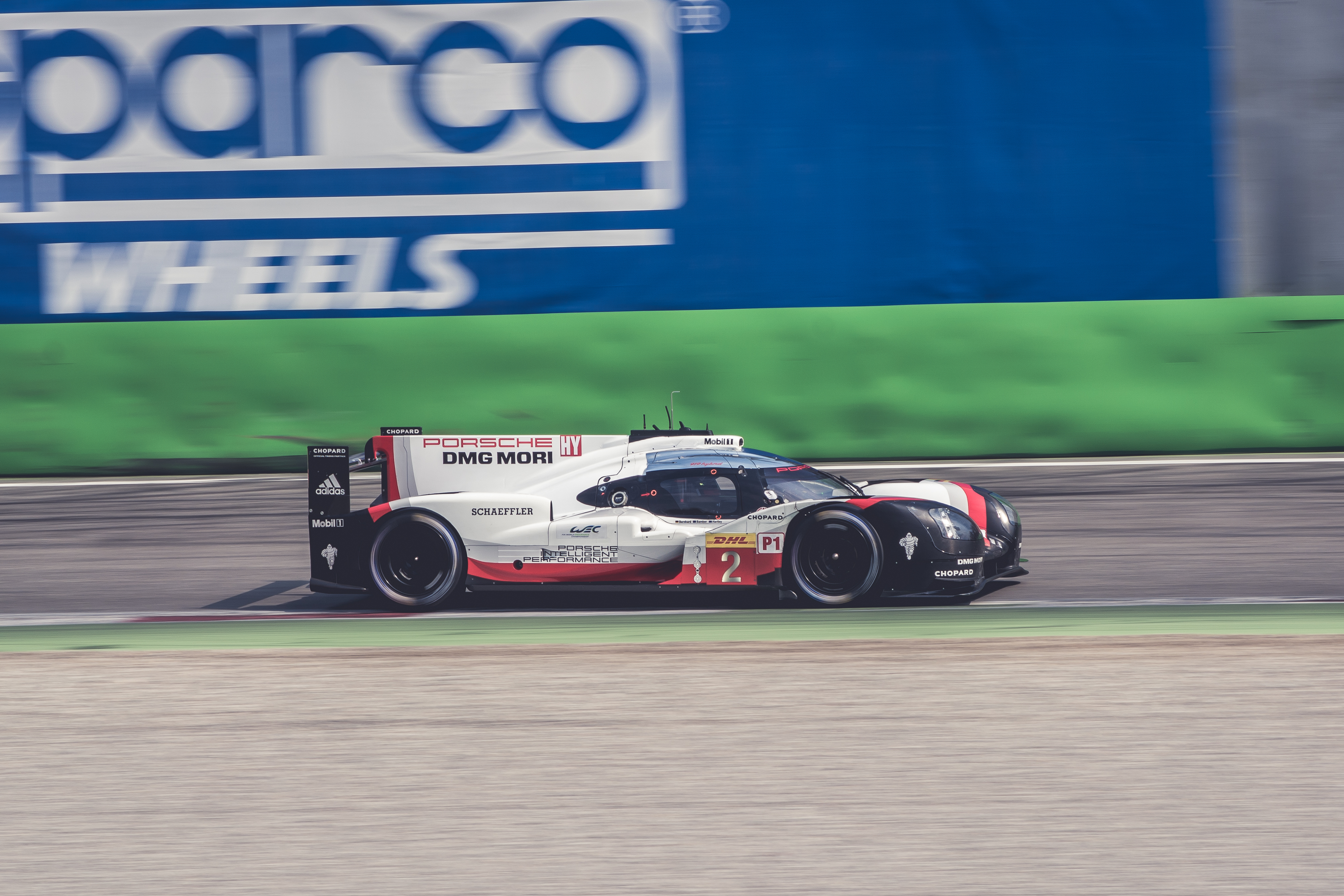
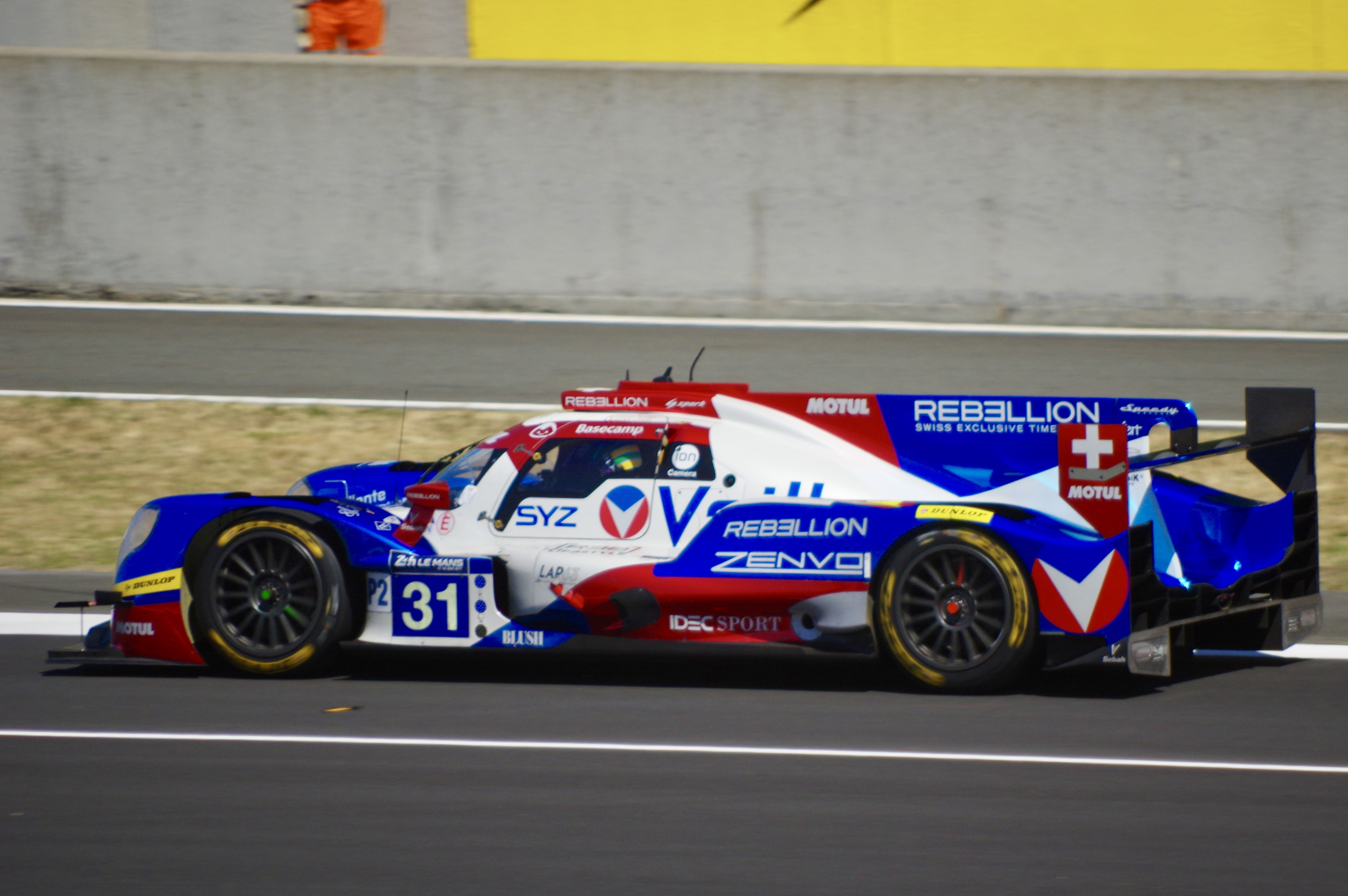
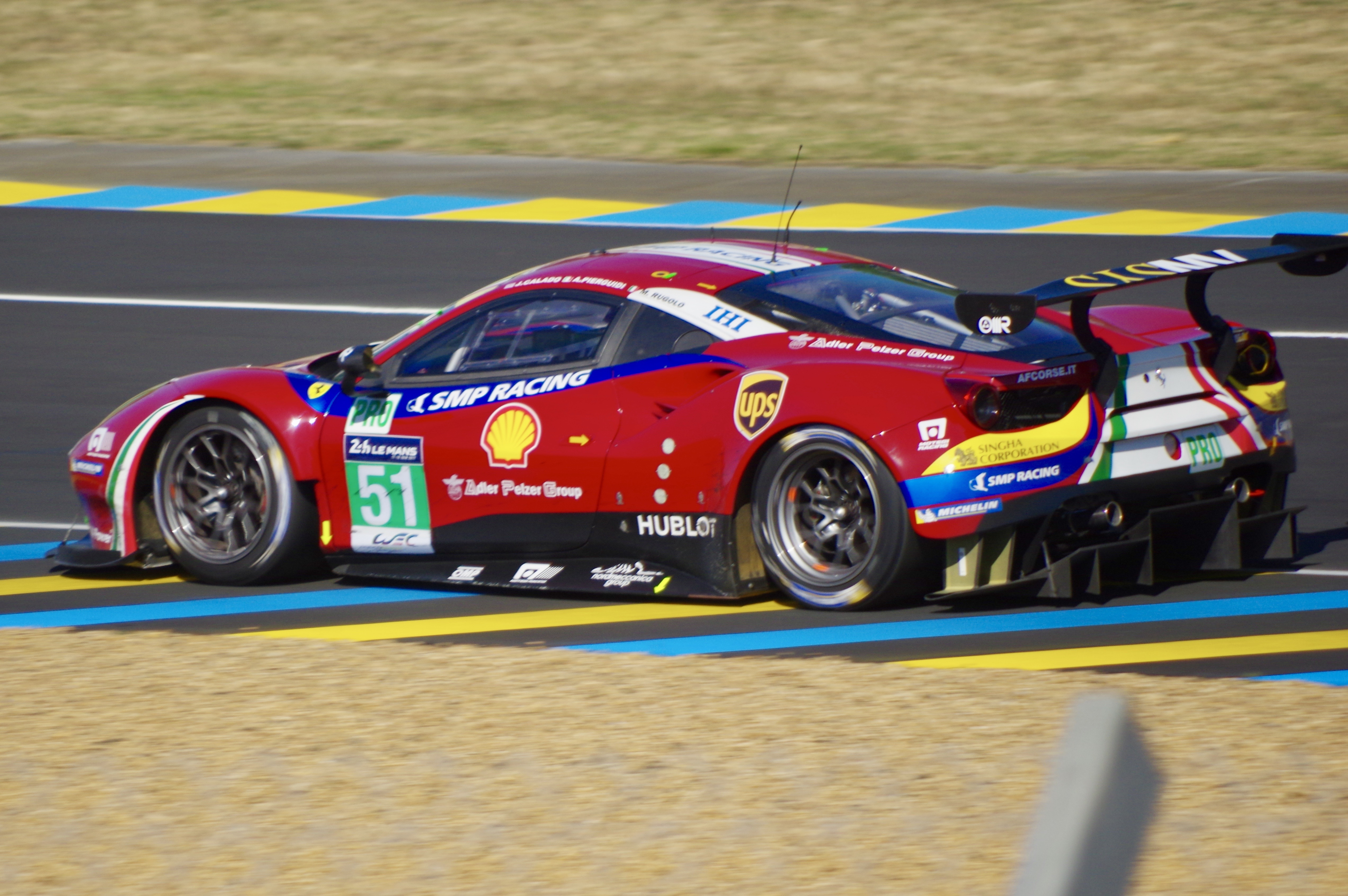
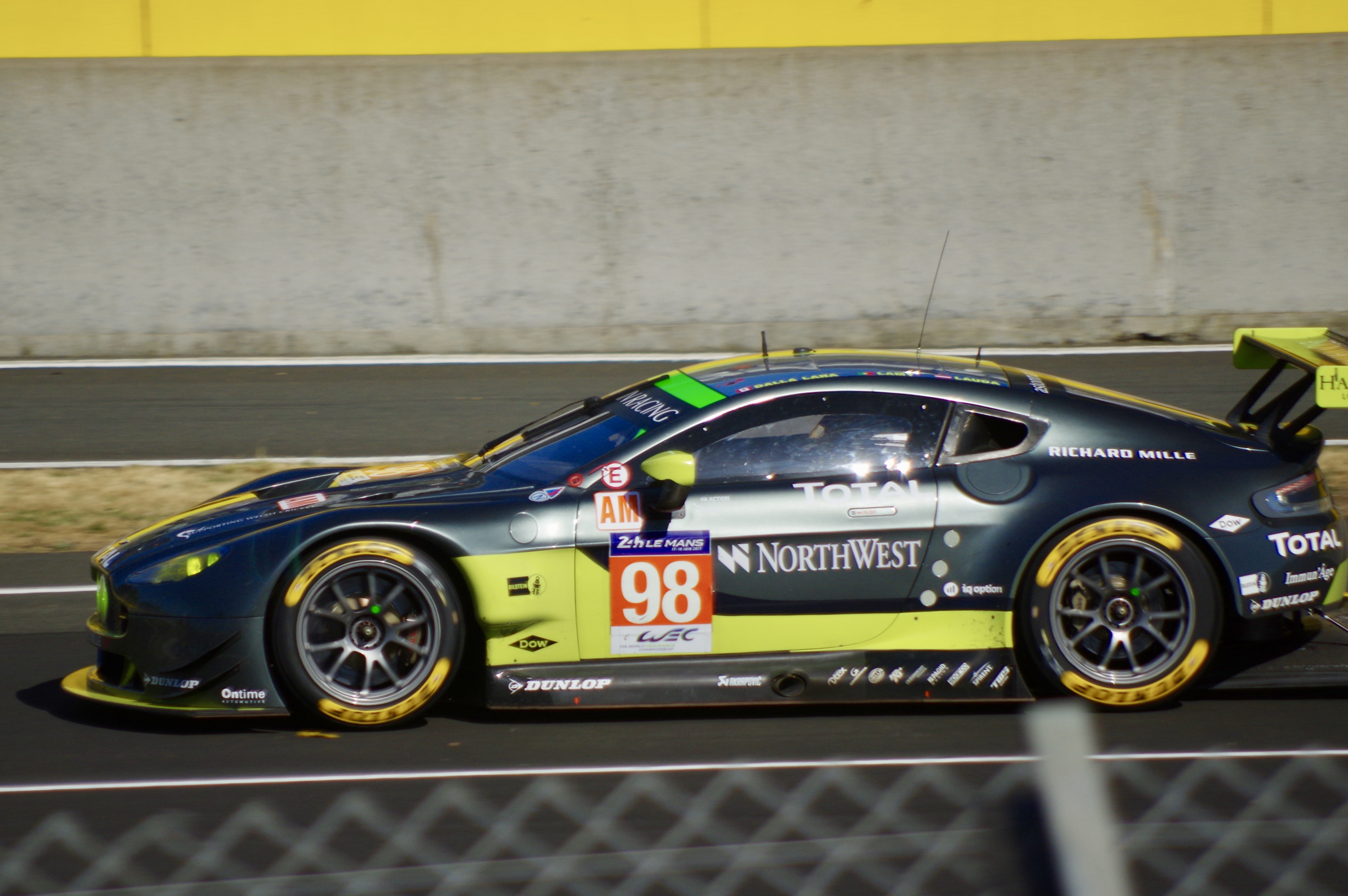
The No. 2 Porsche Racing drivers won the World Endurance Drivers' Championship, with Porsche also winning the World Endurance Manufacturers' Championship. The No. 31 Rebellion Racing won the LMP2 Teams' and Drivers' championships. The No. 51 AF Corse won the GT World Endurance Championship, the Endurance Trophy for LMGTE Pro Teams, with Ferrari winning the GT World Endurance Manufacturers' Championship. The No. 98 Aston Martin Racing drivers won the Endurance Trophy for LMGTE Am Drivers and the Endurance Trophy for LMGTE Am Teams.

The 2017 FIA World Endurance Championship was the sixth season of the FIA World Endurance Championship, an auto racing series co-organised by the Fédération Internationale de l'Automobile (FIA) and the Automobile Club de l'Ouest (ACO). The series is open to Le Mans Prototypes and grand tourer-style racing cars divided into four categories. The season began at the Silverstone Circuit in April and ended at the Bahrain International Circuit in November, and included the 85th running of the 24 Hours of Le Mans. World championship titles were awarded to the leading prototype drivers and manufacturers, while for the first time in the World Endurance Championship the leading grand touring drivers and manufacturers were also awarded a world championship.

Brendon Hartley, Earl Bamber and Timo Bernhard won the World Endurance Championship for Drivers and Porsche were victorious in the World Endurance Championship for Manufacturers. The World Endurance Championship for LMGTE Drivers was won by Alessandro Pier Guidi and James Calado with the World Endurance Championship for LMGTE Manufacturers awarded to Ferrari.

== Schedule ==
The ACO announced a provisional calendar on 22 September 2016, largely identical to the 2016 schedule. For the 2017 season, the 6 Hours of Nürburgring event was moved one week earlier in the year, in order to avoid a potential clash with the German Grand Prix. At the same time, for the first time in the history of the WEC, the official pre-season test was not held at Circuit Paul Ricard in France, and was instead held at the Autodromo Nazionale Monza in Italy.

Rnd	Race	Circuit	Location	Date
	Prologue	Autodromo Nazionale di Monza	(Italy) Monza	1/2 April
1	6 Hours of Silverstone	Silverstone Circuit	(United Kingdom) Silverstone	16 April
2	6 Hours of Spa-Francorchamps	Circuit de Spa-Francorchamps	(Belgium) Stavelot	6 May
3	24 Hours of Le Mans	Circuit de la Sarthe	(France) Le Mans	17–18 June
4	6 Hours of Nürburgring	Nürburgring	(Germany) Nürburg	16 July
5	6 Hours of Mexico	Autódromo Hermanos Rodríguez	Mexico City	3 September
6	6 Hours of Circuit of the Americas	Circuit of the Americas	(United States) Austin, Texas	16 September
7	6 Hours of Fuji	Fuji Speedway	(Japan) Oyama, Shizuoka	15 October
8	6 Hours of Shanghai	Shanghai International Circuit	(China) Shanghai	5 November
9	6 Hours of Bahrain	Bahrain International Circuit	(Bahrain) Sakhir	18 November

== Teams and drivers ==
On 26 October 2016, Audi Sport Team Joest announced its withdrawal from the World Endurance Championship (WEC) at the end of the season.

Key
Full-season entry	Additional entry	Third manufacturer entry
* Eligible for all championship points	* Eligible only for Drivers' championship points	* Eligible for Drivers' championship points * Only eligible for Manufacturers' championship points at Le Mans

=== LMP1 ===
Entrant	Car	Engine	Hybrid	Tyre	No.	Drivers	Rounds
(Germany) Porsche LMP Team	Porsche 919 Hybrid	Porsche 9R9 2.0 L Turbo V4	Hybrid	M	1	(Switzerland) Neel Jani	All
(Germany) Porsche LMP Team	Porsche 919 Hybrid	Porsche 9R9 2.0 L Turbo V4	Hybrid	M	1	(United Kingdom) Nick Tandy	All
(Germany) Porsche LMP Team	Porsche 919 Hybrid	Porsche 9R9 2.0 L Turbo V4	Hybrid	M	1	(Germany) André Lotterer	All
(Germany) Porsche LMP Team	Porsche 919 Hybrid	Porsche 9R9 2.0 L Turbo V4	Hybrid	M	2	(Germany) Timo Bernhard	All
(Germany) Porsche LMP Team	Porsche 919 Hybrid	Porsche 9R9 2.0 L Turbo V4	Hybrid	M	2	(New Zealand) Brendon Hartley	All
(Germany) Porsche LMP Team	Porsche 919 Hybrid	Porsche 9R9 2.0 L Turbo V4	Hybrid	M	2	(New Zealand) Earl Bamber	All
(Austria) ByKolles Racing Team	ENSO CLM P1/01	Nismo VRX30A 3.0 L Turbo V6		M	4	(United Kingdom) Oliver Webb	1–4
(Austria) ByKolles Racing Team	ENSO CLM P1/01	Nismo VRX30A 3.0 L Turbo V6		M	4	(Austria) Dominik Kraihamer	1–4
(Austria) ByKolles Racing Team	ENSO CLM P1/01	Nismo VRX30A 3.0 L Turbo V6		M	4	(United Kingdom) James Rossiter	1–2
(Austria) ByKolles Racing Team	ENSO CLM P1/01	Nismo VRX30A 3.0 L Turbo V6		M	4	(Italy) Marco Bonanomi	3–4
(Japan) Toyota Gazoo Racing	Toyota TS050 Hybrid	Toyota H8909 2.4 L Turbo V6	Hybrid	M	7	(United Kingdom) Mike Conway	All
(Japan) Toyota Gazoo Racing	Toyota TS050 Hybrid	Toyota H8909 2.4 L Turbo V6	Hybrid	M	7	(Japan) Kamui Kobayashi	All
(Japan) Toyota Gazoo Racing	Toyota TS050 Hybrid	Toyota H8909 2.4 L Turbo V6	Hybrid	M	7	(Argentina) José María López	1, 4–9
(Japan) Toyota Gazoo Racing	Toyota TS050 Hybrid	Toyota H8909 2.4 L Turbo V6	Hybrid	M	7	(France) Stéphane Sarrazin	3
(Japan) Toyota Gazoo Racing	Toyota TS050 Hybrid	Toyota H8909 2.4 L Turbo V6	Hybrid	M	8	(Switzerland) Sébastien Buemi	All
(Japan) Toyota Gazoo Racing	Toyota TS050 Hybrid	Toyota H8909 2.4 L Turbo V6	Hybrid	M	8	(Japan) Kazuki Nakajima	All
(Japan) Toyota Gazoo Racing	Toyota TS050 Hybrid	Toyota H8909 2.4 L Turbo V6	Hybrid	M	8	(United Kingdom) Anthony Davidson	1–5, 7−9
(Japan) Toyota Gazoo Racing	Toyota TS050 Hybrid	Toyota H8909 2.4 L Turbo V6	Hybrid	M	8	(France) Stéphane Sarrazin	6
(Japan) Toyota Gazoo Racing	Toyota TS050 Hybrid	Toyota H8909 2.4 L Turbo V6	Hybrid	M	9	(Japan) Yuji Kunimoto	2–3
(Japan) Toyota Gazoo Racing	Toyota TS050 Hybrid	Toyota H8909 2.4 L Turbo V6	Hybrid	M	9	(France) Nicolas Lapierre	2–3
(Japan) Toyota Gazoo Racing	Toyota TS050 Hybrid	Toyota H8909 2.4 L Turbo V6	Hybrid	M	9	(France) Stéphane Sarrazin	2
(Japan) Toyota Gazoo Racing	Toyota TS050 Hybrid	Toyota H8909 2.4 L Turbo V6	Hybrid	M	9	(Argentina) José María López	3

- Robert Kubica was scheduled to compete for the ByKolles Racing Team, but withdrew prior to the start of the season.

=== LMP2 ===
In accordance with the new Le Mans Prototype LMP2 regulations for 2017, all cars utilised the Gibson GK428 4.2 L V8 engine.

Entrant	Car	Tyre	No.	Drivers	Rounds
(Switzerland) Vaillante Rebellion	Oreca 07	D	13	(Switzerland) Mathias Beche	All
(Switzerland) Vaillante Rebellion	Oreca 07	D	13	(Denmark) David Heinemeier Hansson	All
(Switzerland) Vaillante Rebellion	Oreca 07	D	13	(Brazil) Nelson Piquet Jr.	1–3, 5–9
(Switzerland) Vaillante Rebellion	Oreca 07	D	13	(Brazil) Pipo Derani	4
(Switzerland) Vaillante Rebellion	Oreca 07	D	31	(Brazil) Bruno Senna	All
(Switzerland) Vaillante Rebellion	Oreca 07	D	31	(France) Julien Canal	All
(Switzerland) Vaillante Rebellion	Oreca 07	D	31	(France) Nicolas Prost	1–3, 5–9
(Switzerland) Vaillante Rebellion	Oreca 07	D	31	(Portugal) Filipe Albuquerque	4
(China) CEFC Manor TRS Racing	Oreca 07	D	24	(Thailand) Tor Graves	1–4
(China) CEFC Manor TRS Racing	Oreca 07	D	24	(Switzerland) Jonathan Hirschi	1–4
(China) CEFC Manor TRS Racing	Oreca 07	D	24	(France) Jean-Éric Vergne	1–3, 5–9
(China) CEFC Manor TRS Racing	Oreca 07	D	24	(Spain) Roberto Merhi	4
(China) CEFC Manor TRS Racing	Oreca 07	D	24	(United Kingdom) Ben Hanley	5–9
(China) CEFC Manor TRS Racing	Oreca 07	D	24	(United Kingdom) Matt Rao	5–9
(China) CEFC Manor TRS Racing	Oreca 07	D	25	(Mexico) Roberto González	All
(China) CEFC Manor TRS Racing	Oreca 07	D	25	(Switzerland) Simon Trummer	All
(China) CEFC Manor TRS Racing	Oreca 07	D	25	(Russia) Vitaly Petrov	All
(Russia) G-Drive Racing	Oreca 07	D	22 (Note: Although entered under the G-Drive Racing banner for sponsorship purposes and considered an additional entry by the FIA, the No. 22 is entered by the DragonSpeed Racing team of the European Le Mans Series, and not associated with the No. 26 car entered by TDS Racing.)	(Mexico) Memo Rojas	3
(Russia) G-Drive Racing	Oreca 07	D	22	(Mexico) José Gutiérrez	3
(Russia) G-Drive Racing	Oreca 07	D	22	(Japan) Ryō Hirakawa	3
(Russia) G-Drive Racing	Oreca 07	D	26	(Russia) Roman Rusinov	All
(Russia) G-Drive Racing	Oreca 07	D	26	(France) Pierre Thiriet	1–7
(Russia) G-Drive Racing	Oreca 07	D	26	(United Kingdom) Alex Lynn	1–3, 5–6
(Russia) G-Drive Racing	Oreca 07	D	26	(United Kingdom) Ben Hanley	4
(Russia) G-Drive Racing	Oreca 07	D	26	(United Kingdom) James Rossiter	7
(Russia) G-Drive Racing	Oreca 07	D	26	(France) Léo Roussel	8–9
(Russia) G-Drive Racing	Oreca 07	D	26	(Switzerland) Nico Müller	8
(Russia) G-Drive Racing	Oreca 07	D	26	(France) Loïc Duval	9
(France) TDS Racing	Oreca 07	D	28	(France) Emmanuel Collard	All
(France) TDS Racing	Oreca 07	D	28	(France) François Perrodo	All
(France) TDS Racing	Oreca 07	D	28	(France) Matthieu Vaxivière	1, 3–9
(France) TDS Racing	Oreca 07	D	28	(United Kingdom) Ben Hanley	2
(France) Signatech Alpine Matmut	Alpine A470	D	35	(France) Nelson Panciatici	2–4
(France) Signatech Alpine Matmut	Alpine A470	D	35	(France) Pierre Ragues	2–4
(France) Signatech Alpine Matmut	Alpine A470	D	35	(Brazil) André Negrão	2–4
(France) Signatech Alpine Matmut	Alpine A470	D	36	(United States) Gustavo Menezes	All
(France) Signatech Alpine Matmut	Alpine A470	D	36	(United Kingdom) Matt Rao	1–4
(France) Signatech Alpine Matmut	Alpine A470	D	36	(France) Nicolas Lapierre	1, 4–9
(France) Signatech Alpine Matmut	Alpine A470	D	36	(France) Romain Dumas	2–3
(France) Signatech Alpine Matmut	Alpine A470	D	36	(Brazil) André Negrão	5–9
(China) Jackie Chan DC Racing	Oreca 07	D	37	(United States) David Cheng	All
(China) Jackie Chan DC Racing	Oreca 07	D	37	(France) Tristan Gommendy	All
(China) Jackie Chan DC Racing	Oreca 07	D	37	(United Kingdom) Alex Brundle	All
(China) Jackie Chan DC Racing	Oreca 07	D	38	(China) Ho-Pin Tung	All
(China) Jackie Chan DC Racing	Oreca 07	D	38	(France) Thomas Laurent	All
(China) Jackie Chan DC Racing	Oreca 07	D	38	(United Kingdom) Oliver Jarvis	All

=== LMGTE Pro ===
Entrant	Car	Engine	Tyre	No.	Drivers	Rounds
(Italy) AF Corse	Ferrari 488 GTE	Ferrari F154CB 4.0 L Turbo V8	M	51	(United Kingdom) James Calado	All
(Italy) AF Corse	Ferrari 488 GTE	Ferrari F154CB 4.0 L Turbo V8	M	51	(Italy) Alessandro Pier Guidi	All
(Italy) AF Corse	Ferrari 488 GTE	Ferrari F154CB 4.0 L Turbo V8	M	51	(Italy) Michele Rugolo	3
(Italy) AF Corse	Ferrari 488 GTE	Ferrari F154CB 4.0 L Turbo V8	M	71	(Italy) Davide Rigon	All
(Italy) AF Corse	Ferrari 488 GTE	Ferrari F154CB 4.0 L Turbo V8	M	71	(United Kingdom) Sam Bird	1–3, 5–9
(Italy) AF Corse	Ferrari 488 GTE	Ferrari F154CB 4.0 L Turbo V8	M	71	(Spain) Miguel Molina	3
(Italy) AF Corse	Ferrari 488 GTE	Ferrari F154CB 4.0 L Turbo V8	M	71	(Finland) Toni Vilander	4
(United States) Ford Chip Ganassi Team UK	Ford GT	Ford EcoBoost D35 3.5 L Turbo V6	M	66	(Germany) Stefan Mücke	All
(United States) Ford Chip Ganassi Team UK	Ford GT	Ford EcoBoost D35 3.5 L Turbo V6	M	66	(France) Olivier Pla	All
(United States) Ford Chip Ganassi Team UK	Ford GT	Ford EcoBoost D35 3.5 L Turbo V6	M	66	(United States) Billy Johnson	1–3
(United States) Ford Chip Ganassi Team UK	Ford GT	Ford EcoBoost D35 3.5 L Turbo V6	M	67	(United Kingdom) Andy Priaulx	All
(United States) Ford Chip Ganassi Team UK	Ford GT	Ford EcoBoost D35 3.5 L Turbo V6	M	67	(United Kingdom) Harry Tincknell	All
(United States) Ford Chip Ganassi Team UK	Ford GT	Ford EcoBoost D35 3.5 L Turbo V6	M	67	(Brazil) Pipo Derani	1–3
(Germany) Porsche GT Team	Porsche 911 RSR	Porsche M97/80 4.0 L Flat-6	M	91	(Austria) Richard Lietz	All
(Germany) Porsche GT Team	Porsche 911 RSR	Porsche M97/80 4.0 L Flat-6	M	91	(France) Frédéric Makowiecki	All
(Germany) Porsche GT Team	Porsche 911 RSR	Porsche M97/80 4.0 L Flat-6	M	91	(France) Patrick Pilet	3
(Germany) Porsche GT Team	Porsche 911 RSR	Porsche M97/80 4.0 L Flat-6	M	92	(Denmark) Michael Christensen	All
(Germany) Porsche GT Team	Porsche 911 RSR	Porsche M97/80 4.0 L Flat-6	M	92	(France) Kévin Estre	All
(Germany) Porsche GT Team	Porsche 911 RSR	Porsche M97/80 4.0 L Flat-6	M	92	(Germany) Dirk Werner	3
(United Kingdom) Aston Martin Racing	Aston Martin Vantage GTE	Aston Martin AM05 4.5 L V8	D	95	(Denmark) Nicki Thiim	All
(United Kingdom) Aston Martin Racing	Aston Martin Vantage GTE	Aston Martin AM05 4.5 L V8	D	95	(Denmark) Marco Sørensen	All
(United Kingdom) Aston Martin Racing	Aston Martin Vantage GTE	Aston Martin AM05 4.5 L V8	D	95	(New Zealand) Richie Stanaway	1–3
(United Kingdom) Aston Martin Racing	Aston Martin Vantage GTE	Aston Martin AM05 4.5 L V8	D	97	(United Kingdom) Darren Turner	All
(United Kingdom) Aston Martin Racing	Aston Martin Vantage GTE	Aston Martin AM05 4.5 L V8	D	97	(United Kingdom) Jonathan Adam	All
(United Kingdom) Aston Martin Racing	Aston Martin Vantage GTE	Aston Martin AM05 4.5 L V8	D	97	(Brazil) Daniel Serra	1–6

- Lucas di Grassi was scheduled to compete for AF Corse at the 24 Hours of Le Mans, but withdrew after breaking his ankle playing football. He was replaced by Michele Rugolo.

=== LMGTE Am ===
Entrant	Car	Engine	Tyre	No.	Drivers	Rounds
(Switzerland) Spirit of Race	Ferrari 488 GTE	Ferrari F154CB 4.0 L Turbo V8	M	54	(Switzerland) Thomas Flohr	All
(Switzerland) Spirit of Race	Ferrari 488 GTE	Ferrari F154CB 4.0 L Turbo V8	M	54	(Italy) Francesco Castellacci	All
(Switzerland) Spirit of Race	Ferrari 488 GTE	Ferrari F154CB 4.0 L Turbo V8	M	54	(Spain) Miguel Molina	1–2, 4–9
(Switzerland) Spirit of Race	Ferrari 488 GTE	Ferrari F154CB 4.0 L Turbo V8	M	54	(Monaco) Olivier Beretta	3
(Switzerland) Spirit of Race	Ferrari 488 GTE	Ferrari F154CB 4.0 L Turbo V8	M	55	(United Kingdom) Duncan Cameron	3
(Switzerland) Spirit of Race	Ferrari 488 GTE	Ferrari F154CB 4.0 L Turbo V8	M	55	(United Kingdom) Aaron Scott	3
(Switzerland) Spirit of Race	Ferrari 488 GTE	Ferrari F154CB 4.0 L Turbo V8	M	55	(Italy) Marco Cioci	3
(Singapore) Clearwater Racing	Ferrari 488 GTE	Ferrari F154CB 4.0 L Turbo V8	M	60	(Singapore) Richard Wee	3
(Singapore) Clearwater Racing	Ferrari 488 GTE	Ferrari F154CB 4.0 L Turbo V8	M	60	(Japan) Hiroki Katoh	3
(Singapore) Clearwater Racing	Ferrari 488 GTE	Ferrari F154CB 4.0 L Turbo V8	M	60	(Portugal) Álvaro Parente	3
(Singapore) Clearwater Racing	Ferrari 488 GTE	Ferrari F154CB 4.0 L Turbo V8	M	61	(Malaysia) Weng Sun Mok	All
(Singapore) Clearwater Racing	Ferrari 488 GTE	Ferrari F154CB 4.0 L Turbo V8	M	61	(Japan) Keita Sawa	All
(Singapore) Clearwater Racing	Ferrari 488 GTE	Ferrari F154CB 4.0 L Turbo V8	M	61	(Republic of Ireland) Matt Griffin	All
(Germany) Dempsey-Proton Racing	Porsche 911 RSR	Porsche M97/80 4.0 L Flat-6	D	77	(Germany) Christian Ried	All
(Germany) Dempsey-Proton Racing	Porsche 911 RSR	Porsche M97/80 4.0 L Flat-6	D	77	(Germany) Marvin Dienst	All
(Germany) Dempsey-Proton Racing	Porsche 911 RSR	Porsche M97/80 4.0 L Flat-6	D	77	(Italy) Matteo Cairoli	All
(United Kingdom) Gulf Racing	Porsche 911 RSR	Porsche M97/80 4.0 L Flat-6	D	86	(United Kingdom) Ben Barker	All
(United Kingdom) Gulf Racing	Porsche 911 RSR	Porsche M97/80 4.0 L Flat-6	D	86	(Australia) Nick Foster	All
(United Kingdom) Gulf Racing	Porsche 911 RSR	Porsche M97/80 4.0 L Flat-6	D	86	(United Kingdom) Michael Wainwright	1–6, 9
(United Kingdom) Gulf Racing	Porsche 911 RSR	Porsche M97/80 4.0 L Flat-6	D	86	(United States) Mike Hedlund	7
(United Kingdom) Gulf Racing	Porsche 911 RSR	Porsche M97/80 4.0 L Flat-6	D	86	(United Arab Emirates) Khaled Al Qubaisi	8
(United Kingdom) Aston Martin Racing	Aston Martin Vantage GTE	Aston Martin AM05 4.5 L V8	D	98	(Canada) Paul Dalla Lana	All
(United Kingdom) Aston Martin Racing	Aston Martin Vantage GTE	Aston Martin AM05 4.5 L V8	D	98	(Portugal) Pedro Lamy	All
(United Kingdom) Aston Martin Racing	Aston Martin Vantage GTE	Aston Martin AM05 4.5 L V8	D	98	(Austria) Mathias Lauda	All

== Regulation changes ==
As part of the ACO's 2017 regulations, the LMP2 category has been revamped with the introduction of a single specification motor from Gibson Technology, with increased power output compared to 2016 LMP2s. Cockpit and chassis designs also resembled the LMP1 regulations for safety. The four approved chassis manufacturers were Dallara, Ligier, Oreca and Riley. Due to the single engine manufacturer, LMP2 teams were allowed an unlimited number of engines during the season.

At the behest of the manufacturers in LMGTE, the World Motor Sport Council approved the promotion of the GT Manufacturers' and Drivers' World Cups to world championship status, on par with the Manufacturers' and Drivers' World Championships for the LMP categories. LMGTE teams were also limited to only three tyre compounds over the season, although the third compound does not have to be chosen until Le Mans. However, teams in LMGTE Pro as well as LMP1, were limited to four sets of tyres plus two spares at all six-hour races. LMGTE entries also no longer incurred a penalty for changing an engine between qualifying and the race.

Across all categories, limitations on testing have been decreased in an attempt to lower costs. Wind tunnel testing has also been further restricted.

== Results and standings ==
=== Race results ===
The highest finishing competitor entered in the World Endurance Championship is listed below. Invitational entries may have finished ahead of WEC competitors in individual races.

Rnd.	Circuit	LMP1 Winners	LMP2 Winners	LMGTE Pro Winners	LMGTE Am Winners	Report
1	Silverstone	(Japan) No. 8 Toyota Gazoo Racing	(China) No. 38 Jackie Chan DC Racing	(United States) No. 67 Ford Chip Ganassi Team UK	(Singapore) No. 61 Clearwater Racing	Results
1	Silverstone	(Switzerland) Sébastien Buemi (United Kingdom) Anthony Davidson (Japan) Kazuki Nakajima	(China) Ho-Pin Tung (France) Thomas Laurent (United Kingdom) Oliver Jarvis	(United Kingdom) Andy Priaulx (United Kingdom) Harry Tincknell (Brazil) Pipo Derani	(Malaysia) Weng Sun Mok (Japan) Keita Sawa (Republic of Ireland) Matt Griffin	Results
2	Spa-Francorchamps	(Japan) No. 8 Toyota Gazoo Racing	(Russia) No. 26 G-Drive Racing	(Italy) No. 71 AF Corse	(United Kingdom) No. 98 Aston Martin Racing	Results
2	Spa-Francorchamps	(Switzerland) Sébastien Buemi (United Kingdom) Anthony Davidson (Japan) Kazuki Nakajima	(Russia) Roman Rusinov (France) Pierre Thiriet (United Kingdom) Alex Lynn	(United Kingdom) Sam Bird (Italy) Davide Rigon	(Canada) Paul Dalla Lana (Portugal) Pedro Lamy (Austria) Mathias Lauda	Results
3	Le Mans	(Germany) No. 2 Porsche LMP Team	(China) No. 38 Jackie Chan DC Racing	(United Kingdom) No. 97 Aston Martin Racing	(Switzerland) No. 55 Spirit of Race (Note: The LMGTE Am class winner for Le Mans was the No. 84 JMW Motorsport invitational entry. As it was not a full-season WEC entrant, the points for the win were awarded to the No. 55 Spirit of Race entry.)	Results
3	Le Mans	(Germany) Timo Bernhard (New Zealand) Brendon Hartley (New Zealand) Earl Bamber	(China) Ho-Pin Tung (France) Thomas Laurent (United Kingdom) Oliver Jarvis	(United Kingdom) Darren Turner (United Kingdom) Jonathan Adam (Brazil) Daniel Serra	(United Kingdom) Duncan Cameron (United Kingdom) Aaron Scott (Italy) Marco Cioci	Results
4	Nürburgring	(Germany) No. 2 Porsche LMP Team	(China) No. 38 Jackie Chan DC Racing	(Italy) No. 51 AF Corse	(Germany) No. 77 Dempsey-Proton Racing	Results
4	Nürburgring	(Germany) Timo Bernhard (New Zealand) Brendon Hartley (New Zealand) Earl Bamber	(China) Ho-Pin Tung (France) Thomas Laurent (United Kingdom) Oliver Jarvis	(United Kingdom) James Calado (Italy) Alessandro Pier Guidi	(Germany) Christian Ried (Germany) Marvin Dienst (Italy) Matteo Cairoli	Results
5	Mexico City	(Germany) No. 2 Porsche LMP Team	(Switzerland) No. 31 Vaillante Rebellion	(United Kingdom) No. 95 Aston Martin Racing	(Germany) No. 77 Dempsey-Proton Racing	Results
5	Mexico City	(Germany) Timo Bernhard (New Zealand) Brendon Hartley (New Zealand) Earl Bamber	(France) Julien Canal (France) Nicolas Prost (Brazil) Bruno Senna	(Denmark) Marco Sørensen (Denmark) Nicki Thiim	(Germany) Christian Ried (Germany) Marvin Dienst (Italy) Matteo Cairoli	Results
6	Austin	(Germany) No. 2 Porsche LMP Team	(France) No. 36 Signatech Alpine Matmut	(Italy) No. 51 AF Corse	(United Kingdom) No. 98 Aston Martin Racing	Results
6	Austin	(Germany) Timo Bernhard (New Zealand) Brendon Hartley (New Zealand) Earl Bamber	(France) Nicolas Lapierre (United States) Gustavo Menezes (Brazil) André Negrão	(United Kingdom) James Calado (Italy) Alessandro Pier Guidi	(Canada) Paul Dalla Lana (Portugal) Pedro Lamy (Austria) Mathias Lauda	Results
7	Fuji	(Japan) No. 8 Toyota Gazoo Racing	(Switzerland) No. 31 Vaillante Rebellion	(Italy) No. 51 AF Corse	(Switzerland) No. 54 Spirit of Race	Results
7	Fuji	(Switzerland) Sébastien Buemi (United Kingdom) Anthony Davidson (Japan) Kazuki Nakajima	(France) Julien Canal (France) Nicolas Prost (Brazil) Bruno Senna	(United Kingdom) James Calado (Italy) Alessandro Pier Guidi	(Switzerland) Thomas Flohr (Italy) Francesco Castellacci (Spain) Miguel Molina	Results
8	Shanghai	(Japan) No. 8 Toyota Gazoo Racing	(Switzerland) No. 31 Vaillante Rebellion	(United States) No. 67 Ford Chip Ganassi Team UK	(United Kingdom) No. 98 Aston Martin Racing	Results
8	Shanghai	(Switzerland) Sébastien Buemi (United Kingdom) Anthony Davidson (Japan) Kazuki Nakajima	(France) Julien Canal (France) Nicolas Prost (Brazil) Bruno Senna	(United Kingdom) Andy Priaulx (United Kingdom) Harry Tincknell	(Canada) Paul Dalla Lana (Portugal) Pedro Lamy (Austria) Mathias Lauda	Results
9	Bahrain	(Japan) No. 8 Toyota Gazoo Racing	(Switzerland) No. 31 Vaillante Rebellion	(Italy) No. 71 AF Corse	(United Kingdom) No. 98 Aston Martin Racing	Results
9	Bahrain	(Switzerland) Sébastien Buemi (United Kingdom) Anthony Davidson (Japan) Kazuki Nakajima	(France) Julien Canal (France) Nicolas Prost (Brazil) Bruno Senna	(United Kingdom) Sam Bird (Italy) Davide Rigon	(Canada) Paul Dalla Lana (Portugal) Pedro Lamy (Austria) Mathias Lauda	Results

Entries were required to complete the timed race as well as to complete 70% of the overall winning car's race distance in order to earn championship points. A single bonus point was awarded to the team and all drivers of the pole position car for each category in qualifying. For the 24 Hours of Le Mans, the race result points allocation was doubled. Furthermore, a race must complete three laps under green flag conditions in order for championship points to be awarded.

=== Driver championships ===
Four titles were offered to drivers, two with world championship status. The World Endurance Drivers' Championship was reserved for LMP1 and LMP2 drivers while the GT World Endurance Drivers' Championship was available for drivers in the LMGTE categories. An FIA Endurance Trophy was awarded in the LMP2 and in the LMGTE Am categories. The FIA Endurance Trophy for LMP1 Private Teams Drivers was not rewarded in 2017 due to not meeting the minimum number of entrants.

Points systems
Duration	1st	2nd	3rd	4th	5th	6th	7th	8th	9th	10th	Other	Pole
6 Hours	25	18	15	12	10	8	6	4	2	1	0.5	1
24 Hours	50	36	30	24	20	16	12	8	4	2	1	1

==== World Endurance Drivers' Championship ====
Pos.	Driver	Team	SIL (United Kingdom)	SPA (Belgium)	LMS (France)	NÜR (Germany)	MEX (Mexico)	COA (United States)	FUJ (Japan)	SHA (China)	BHR (Bahrain)	Total points
1	(Germany) Timo Bernhard	(Germany) Porsche LMP Team	2	3	1	1	**1**	1	**4**	2	2	208
1	(New Zealand) Earl Bamber	(Germany) Porsche LMP Team	2	3	1	1	**1**	1	**4**	2	2	208
1	(New Zealand) Brendon Hartley	(Germany) Porsche LMP Team	2	3	1	1	**1**	1	**4**	2	2	208
2	(Switzerland) Sébastien Buemi	(Japan) Toyota Gazoo Racing	1	1	6	4	3	3	1	1	1	183
2	(Japan) Kazuki Nakajima	(Japan) Toyota Gazoo Racing	1	1	6	4	3	3	1	1	1	183
3	(United Kingdom) Anthony Davidson	(Japan) Toyota Gazoo Racing	1	1	6	4	3		1	1	1	168
4	(Switzerland) Neel Jani	(Germany) Porsche LMP Team	3	**4**	Ret	2	2	**2**	3	3	**3**	129
4	(United Kingdom) Nick Tandy	(Germany) Porsche LMP Team	3	**4**	Ret	2	2	**2**	3	3	**3**	129
4	(Germany) André Lotterer	(Germany) Porsche LMP Team	3	**4**	Ret	2	2	**2**	3	3	**3**	129
5	(United Kingdom) Mike Conway	(Japan) Toyota Gazoo Racing	**13**	2	**Ret**	**3**	4	4	2	**4**	4	103.5
5	(Japan) Kamui Kobayashi	(Japan) Toyota Gazoo Racing	**13**	2	**Ret**	**3**	4	4	2	**4**	4	103.5
6	(Argentina) José María López	(Japan) Toyota Gazoo Racing	**13**		Ret	**3**	4	4	2	**4**	4	84.5
7	(China) Ho-Pin Tung	(China) Jackie Chan DC Racing	4	9	2	5	13	8	7	8	6	82.5
7	(United Kingdom) Oliver Jarvis	(China) Jackie Chan DC Racing	4	9	2	5	13	8	7	8	6	82.5
7	(France) Thomas Laurent	(China) Jackie Chan DC Racing	4	9	2	5	13	8	7	8	6	82.5
8	(Brazil) Bruno Senna	(Switzerland) Vaillante Rebellion	5	8	8	6	5	7	5	5	5	76
8	(France) Julien Canal	(Switzerland) Vaillante Rebellion	5	8	8	6	5	7	5	5	5	76
9	(France) Nicolas Prost	(Switzerland) Vaillante Rebellion	5	8	8		5	7	5	5	5	68
10	(Brazil) André Negrão	(France) Signatech Alpine Matmut		12	4	Ret	6	5	6	6	8	62.5
11	(United States) Gustavo Menezes	(France) Signatech Alpine Matmut	7	11	7	7	6	5	6	6	8	62.5
12	(France) Nicolas Lapierre	(France) Signatech Alpine Matmut	7			7	6	5	6	6	8	60
12	(France) Nicolas Lapierre	(Japan) Toyota Gazoo Racing		5	Ret							60
13	(United States) David Cheng	(China) Jackie Chan DC Racing	11	16	3	9	10	9	Ret	12	12	37
13	(United Kingdom) Alex Brundle	(China) Jackie Chan DC Racing	11	16	3	9	10	9	Ret	12	12	37
13	(France) Tristan Gommendy	(China) Jackie Chan DC Racing	11	16	3	9	10	9	Ret	12	12	37
14	(United Kingdom) Matt Rao	(France) Signatech Alpine Matmut	7	11	7	7						35
14	(United Kingdom) Matt Rao	(China) CEFC Manor TRS Racing					7	10	9	13	10	35
15	(France) Jean-Éric Vergne	(China) CEFC Manor TRS Racing	9	13	5		7	10	9	13	10	32.5
16	(Denmark) David Heinemeier Hansson	(Switzerland) Vaillante Rebellion	13	10	DSQ	8	9	6	DSQ	7	7	27.5
16	(Switzerland) Mathias Beche	(Switzerland) Vaillante Rebellion	13	10	DSQ	8	9	6	DSQ	7	7	27.5
17	(France) Stéphane Sarrazin	(Japan) Toyota Gazoo Racing		5	**Ret**			3				26
18	(France) Pierre Ragues	(France) Signatech Alpine Matmut		12	4	Ret						24.5
18	(France) Nelson Panciatici	(France) Signatech Alpine Matmut		12	4	Ret						24.5
19	(Brazil) Nelson Piquet Jr.	(Switzerland) Vaillante Rebellion	13	10	DSQ		9	6	DSQ	7	7	23.5
20	(Switzerland) Jonathan Hirschi	(China) CEFC Manor TRS Racing	9	13	5	13						23
20	(Thailand) Tor Graves	(China) CEFC Manor TRS Racing	9	13	5	13						23
Pos.	Driver	Team	SIL (United Kingdom)	SPA (Belgium)	LMS (France)	NÜR (Germany)	MEX (Mexico)	COA (United States)	FUJ (Japan)	SHA (China)	BHR (Bahrain)	Total points

Colour	Result
Gold	Winner
Silver	Second place
Bronze	Third place
Green	Points classification
Blue	Non-points classification
Blue	Non-classified finish (NC)
Purple	Retired, not classified (Ret)
Red	Did not qualify (DNQ)
Red	Did not pre-qualify (DNPQ)
Black	Disqualified (DSQ)
White	Did not start (DNS)
White	Withdrew (WD)
White	Race cancelled (C)
Blank	Did not practice (DNP)
Blank	Did not arrive (DNA)
Blank	Excluded (EX)

**Bold** - Pole position

==== GT World Endurance Drivers' Championship ====
Pos.	Driver	Team	SIL (United Kingdom)	SPA (Belgium)	LMS (France)	NÜR (Germany)	MEX (Mexico)	COA (United States)	FUJ (Japan)	SHA (China)	BHR (Bahrain)	Total points
1	(United Kingdom) James Calado	(Italy) AF Corse	2	2	14	1	6	1	1	3	2	153
1	(Italy) Alessandro Pier Guidi	(Italy) AF Corse	2	2	14	1	6	1	1	3	2	153
2	(Austria) Richard Lietz	(Germany) Porsche GT Team	3	5	3	2	3	6	**2**	2	4	145
2	(France) Frédéric Makowiecki	(Germany) Porsche GT Team	3	5	3	2	3	6	**2**	2	4	145
3	(United Kingdom) Andy Priaulx	(United States) Ford Chip Ganassi Racing UK	**1**	4	2	5	4	7	13	1	3	142.5
3	(United Kingdom) Harry Tincknell	(United States) Ford Chip Ganassi Racing UK	**1**	4	2	5	4	7	13	1	3	142.5
4	(Italy) Davide Rigon	(Italy) AF Corse	5	**1**	4	11	**2**	**3**	5	6	**1**	139.5
5	(United Kingdom) Sam Bird	(Italy) AF Corse	5	**1**	4		**2**	**3**	5	6	**1**	139
6	(Denmark) Nicki Thiim	(United Kingdom) Aston Martin Racing	6	8	5	4	1	4	7	**5**	7	104
6	(Denmark) Marco Sørensen	(United Kingdom) Aston Martin Racing	6	8	5	4	1	4	7	**5**	7	104
7	(United Kingdom) Darren Turner	(United Kingdom) Aston Martin Racing	7	7	**1**	7	Ret	5	6	7	6	101
7	(United Kingdom) Jonathan Adam	(United Kingdom) Aston Martin Racing	7	7	**1**	7	Ret	5	6	7	6	101
8	(Germany) Stefan Mücke	(United States) Ford Chip Ganassi Racing UK	4	3	6	6	7	8	4	4	5	95
8	(France) Olivier Pla	(United States) Ford Chip Ganassi Racing UK	4	3	6	6	7	8	4	4	5	95
9	(Brazil) Daniel Serra	(United Kingdom) Aston Martin Racing	7	7	**1**	7	Ret	5				79
10	(Brazil) Pipo Derani	(United States) Ford Chip Ganassi Racing UK	**1**	4	2							74
11	(Denmark) Michael Christensen	(Germany) Porsche GT Team	Ret	6	Ret	**3**	5	2	3	Ret	Ret	67
11	(France) Kévin Estre	(Germany) Porsche GT Team	Ret	6	Ret	**3**	5	2	3	Ret	Ret	67
12	(United States) Billy Johnson	(United States) Ford Chip Ganassi Racing UK	4	3	6							43
13	(Spain) Miguel Molina	(Switzerland) Spirit of Race	Ret	12		9	11	11	8	Ret	10	32.5
13	(Spain) Miguel Molina	(Italy) AF Corse			4							32.5
14	(New Zealand) Richie Stanaway	(United Kingdom) Aston Martin Racing	6	8	5							32
15	(France) Patrick Pilet	(Germany) Porsche GT Team			3							30
16	(Canada) Paul Dalla Lana	(United Kingdom) Aston Martin Racing	9	9	10	10	9	9	12	8	9	19.5
16	(Portugal) Pedro Lamy	(United Kingdom) Aston Martin Racing	9	9	10	10	9	9	12	8	9	19.5
16	(Austria) Mathias Lauda	(United Kingdom) Aston Martin Racing	9	9	10	10	9	9	12	8	9	19.5
17	(Malaysia) Weng Sun Mok	(Singapore) Clearwater Racing	8	11	8	12	12	10	9	11	9	19
17	(Japan) Keita Sawa	(Singapore) Clearwater Racing	8	11	8	12	12	10	9	11	9	19
17	(Republic of Ireland) Matt Griffin	(Singapore) Clearwater Racing	8	11	8	12	12	10	9	11	9	19
18	(Germany) Christian Ried	(Germany) Dempsey-Proton Racing	10	10	9	8	8	12	10	10	11	17
18	(Germany) Marvin Dienst	(Germany) Dempsey-Proton Racing	10	10	9	8	8	12	10	10	11	17
18	(Italy) Matteo Cairoli	(Germany) Dempsey-Proton Racing	10	10	9	8	8	12	10	10	11	17
Pos.	Driver	Team	SIL (United Kingdom)	SPA (Belgium)	LMS (France)	NÜR (Germany)	MEX (Mexico)	COA (United States)	FUJ (Japan)	SHA (China)	BHR (Bahrain)	Total points

==== Endurance Trophy for LMP2 Drivers ====
Pos.	Driver	Team	SIL (United Kingdom)	SPA (Belgium)	LMS (France)	NÜR (Germany)	MEX (Mexico)	COA (United States)	FUJ (Japan)	SHA (China)	BHR (Bahrain)	Total points
1	(France) Julien Canal	(Switzerland) Vaillante Rebellion	2	2	6	2	1	3	1	**1**	1	186
1	(Brazil) Bruno Senna	(Switzerland) Vaillante Rebellion	2	2	6	2	1	3	1	**1**	1	186
2	(China) Ho-Pin Tung	(China) Jackie Chan DC Racing	1	3	1	**1**	9	4	3	4	2	175
2	(United Kingdom) Oliver Jarvis	(China) Jackie Chan DC Racing	1	3	1	**1**	9	4	3	4	2	175
2	(France) Thomas Laurent	(China) Jackie Chan DC Racing	1	3	1	**1**	9	4	3	4	2	175
3	(France) Nicolas Prost	(Switzerland) Vaillante Rebellion	2	2	6		1	3	1	**1**	1	168
4	(United States) Gustavo Menezes	(France) Signatech Alpine Matmut	4	5	5	3	**2**	**1**	2	2	**4**	151
5	(Brazil) André Negrão	(France) Signatech Alpine Matmut		6	3	Ret	**2**	**1**	2	2	**4**	132
6	(France) Nicolas Lapierre	(France) Signatech Alpine Matmut	4			3	**2**	**1**	2	2	**4**	121
7	(United Kingdom) Matt Rao	(France) Signatech Alpine Matmut	4	5	5	3						100
7	(United Kingdom) Matt Rao	(China) CEFC Manor TRS Racing					3	6	5	9	6	100
8	(Switzerland) Mathias Beche	(Switzerland) Vaillante Rebellion	9	4	DSQ	4	5	2	**DSQ**	3	3	85
8	(Denmark) David Heinemeier Hansson	(Switzerland) Vaillante Rebellion	9	4	DSQ	4	5	2	**DSQ**	3	3	85
9	(Russia) Roman Rusinov	(Russia) G-Drive Racing	**5**	**1**	**Ret**	6	4	8	6	7	7	82
10	(France) Jean-Éric Vergne	(China) CEFC Manor TRS Racing	6	7	4		3	6	5	9	6	81
11	(United States) David Cheng	(China) Jackie Chan DC Racing	8	10	2	5	6	5	Ret	8	8	77
11	(United Kingdom) Alex Brundle	(China) Jackie Chan DC Racing	8	10	2	5	6	5	Ret	8	8	77
11	(France) Tristan Gommendy	(China) Jackie Chan DC Racing	8	10	2	5	6	5	Ret	8	8	77
12	(Brazil) Nelson Piquet Jr.	(Switzerland) Vaillante Rebellion	9	4	DSQ		5	2	**DSQ**	3	3	73
13	(France) Pierre Thiriet	(Russia) G-Drive Racing	**5**	**1**	**Ret**	6	4	8	6			70
14	(France) François Perrodo	(France) TDS Racing	3	9	Ret	8	7	7	4	6	9	55
14	(France) Emmanuel Collard	(France) TDS Racing	3	9	Ret	8	7	7	4	6	9	55
15	(United Kingdom) Alex Lynn	(Russia) G-Drive Racing	**5**	**1**	**Ret**		4	8				54
16	(France) Matthieu Vaxivière	(France) TDS Racing	3		Ret	8	7	7	4	6	9	53
17	(United Kingdom) Ben Hanley	(France) TDS Racing		9								53
17	(United Kingdom) Ben Hanley	(Russia) G-Drive Racing				6						53
17	(United Kingdom) Ben Hanley	(China) CEFC Manor TRS Racing					3	6	5	9	6	53
18	(Mexico) Roberto González	(China) CEFC Manor TRS Racing	7	8	Ret	7	8	Ret	7	5	5	46
18	(Switzerland) Simon Trummer	(China) CEFC Manor TRS Racing	7	8	Ret	7	8	Ret	7	5	5	46
18	(Russia) Vitaly Petrov	(China) CEFC Manor TRS Racing	7	8	Ret	7	8	Ret	7	5	5	46
19	(Thailand) Tor Graves	(China) CEFC Manor TRS Racing	6	7	4	9						40
19	(Switzerland) Jonathan Hirschi	(China) CEFC Manor TRS Racing	6	7	4	9						40
20	(France) Nelson Panciatici	(France) Signatech Alpine Matmut		6	3	Ret						38
20	(France) Pierre Ragues	(France) Signatech Alpine Matmut		6	3	Ret						38
Pos.	Driver	Team	SIL (United Kingdom)	SPA (Belgium)	LMS (France)	NÜR (Germany)	MEX (Mexico)	COA (United States)	FUJ (Japan)	SHA (China)	BHR (Bahrain)	Total points

==== Endurance Trophy for LMGTE Am Drivers ====
Pos.	Driver	Team	SIL (United Kingdom)	SPA (Belgium)	LMS (France)	NÜR (Germany)	MEX (Mexico)	COA (United States)	FUJ (Japan)	SHA (China)	BHR (Bahrain)	Total points
1	(Canada) Paul Dalla Lana	(United Kingdom) Aston Martin Racing	**2**	**1**	**4**	**3**	2	**1**	5	**1**	**1**	192
1	(Portugal) Pedro Lamy	(United Kingdom) Aston Martin Racing	**2**	**1**	**4**	**3**	2	**1**	5	**1**	**1**	192
1	(Austria) Mathias Lauda	(United Kingdom) Aston Martin Racing	**2**	**1**	**4**	**3**	2	**1**	5	**1**	**1**	192
2	(Germany) Christian Ried	(Germany) Dempsey-Proton Racing	3	2	3	1	**1**	4	3	3	4	168
2	(Germany) Marvin Dienst	(Germany) Dempsey-Proton Racing	3	2	3	1	**1**	4	3	3	4	168
2	(Italy) Matteo Cairoli	(Germany) Dempsey-Proton Racing	3	2	3	1	**1**	4	3	3	4	168
3	(Malaysia) Weng Sun Mok	(Singapore) Clearwater Racing	1	3	2	4	5	2	**2**	4	2	165
3	(Japan) Keita Sawa	(Singapore) Clearwater Racing	1	3	2	4	5	2	**2**	4	2	165
3	(Republic of Ireland) Matt Griffin	(Singapore) Clearwater Racing	1	3	2	4	5	2	**2**	4	2	165
4	(Switzerland) Thomas Flohr	(Switzerland) Spirit of Race	Ret	4	7	2	4	3	1	Ret	3	109
4	(Italy) Francesco Castellacci	(Switzerland) Spirit of Race	Ret	4	7	2	4	3	1	Ret	3	109
5	(Spain) Miguel Molina	(Switzerland) Spirit of Race	Ret	4		2	4	3	1	Ret	3	97
6	(United Kingdom) Ben Barker	(United Kingdom) Gulf Racing	4	Ret	5	5	3	Ret	4	2	5	97
6	(Australia) Nick Foster	(United Kingdom) Gulf Racing	4	Ret	5	5	3	Ret	4	2	5	97
7	(United Kingdom) Michael Wainwright	(United Kingdom) Gulf Racing	4	Ret	5	5	3	Ret			5	67
8	(United Kingdom) Duncan Cameron	(Switzerland) Spirit of Race			1							50
8	(United Kingdom) Aaron Scott	(Switzerland) Spirit of Race			1							50
8	(Italy) Marco Cioci	(Switzerland) Spirit of Race			1							50
9	(United Arab Emirates) Khaled Al Qubaisi	(United Kingdom) Gulf Racing								2		18
10	(Singapore) Richard Wee	(Singapore) Clearwater Racing			6							16
10	(Japan) Hiroki Katoh	(Singapore) Clearwater Racing			6							16
10	(Portugal) Álvaro Parente	(Singapore) Clearwater Racing			6							16
11	(United States) Mike Hedlund	(United Kingdom) Gulf Racing							4			12
12	(Monaco) Olivier Beretta	(Switzerland) Spirit of Race			7							12

=== Manufacturer championships ===
Two manufacturers' titles were contested, one for LMP1s and one for LMGTEs. The World Endurance Manufacturers' Championship was only open to manufacturer entries in the LMP1 category, while the GT World Endurance Manufacturers' Championship allowed all entries from registered manufacturers in LMGTE Pro and LMGTE Am to participate. The top two finishing cars from each manufacturer earned points toward their total.

==== World Endurance Manufacturers' Championship ====
Pos.	Manufacturer	SIL (United Kingdom)	SPA (Belgium)	LMS (France)	NÜR (Germany)	MEX (Mexico)	COA (United States)	FUJ (Japan)	SHA (China)	BHR (Bahrain)	Total points
1	(Germany) Porsche	2	3	1	1	**1**	1	3	2	2	337
1	(Germany) Porsche	3	**4**	Ret	2	2	**2**	**4**	3	**3**	337
2	(Japan) Toyota	1	1	**6**	**4**	3	3	1	1	1	286.5
2	(Japan) Toyota	**23**	2	Ret	3	4	4	2	**4**	4	286.5

==== GT World Endurance Manufacturers' Championship ====
Pos.	Manufacturer	SIL (United Kingdom)	SPA (Belgium)	LMS (France)	NÜR (Germany)	MEX (Mexico)	COA (United States)	FUJ (Japan)	SHA (China)	BHR (Bahrain)	Total points
1	(Italy) Ferrari	2	**1**	4	1	**2**	1	1	3	**1**	305
1	(Italy) Ferrari	5	2	7	9	6	**3**	5	6	2	305
2	(United States) Ford	**1**	3	2	5	4	7	4	1	3	237.5
2	(United States) Ford	4	4	6	6	7	8	13	4	5	237.5
3	(Germany) Porsche	3	5	3	2	3	2	**2**	2	4	223.5
3	(Germany) Porsche	10	6	8	**3**	5	6	3	9	11	223.5
4	(United Kingdom) Aston Martin	6	7	**1**	4	1	4	6	**5**	6	207
4	(United Kingdom) Aston Martin	7	8	5	7	9	5	7	7	7	207

=== Team championships ===
An FIA Endurance Trophy was awarded in the LMP2, LMGTE Pro, and LMGTE Am categories. A trophy for the private LMP1 teams was not awarded in 2017 due to not meeting the minimum number of entrants.

==== Endurance Trophy for LMP2 Teams ====
Pos.	Car	Team	SIL (United Kingdom)	SPA (Belgium)	LMS (France)	NÜR (Germany)	MEX (Mexico)	COA (United States)	FUJ (Japan)	SHA (China)	BHR (Bahrain)	Total points
1	31	(Switzerland) Vaillante Rebellion	2	2	6	2	1	3	1	**1**	1	186
2	38	(China) Jackie Chan DC Racing	1	3	1	**1**	9	4	3	4	2	175
3	36	(France) Signatech Alpine Matmut	4	5	5	3	**2**	**1**	2	2	**4**	151
4	13	(Switzerland) Vaillante Rebellion	9	4	DSQ	4	5	2	**DSQ**	3	3	85
5	24	(China) CEFC Manor TRS Racing	6	7	4	9	3	6	5	9	6	83
6	26	(Russia) G-Drive Racing	**5**	**1**	**Ret**	6	4	8	6	7	7	82
7	37	(China) Jackie Chan DC Racing	8	10	2	5	6	5	Ret	8	8	77
8	28	(France) TDS Racing	3	9	Ret	8	7	7	4	6	9	55
9	25	(China) CEFC Manor TRS Racing	7	8	Ret	7	8	Ret	7	5	5	46
10	35	(France) Signatech Alpine Matmut		6	3	Ret						38

==== Endurance Trophy for LMGTE Pro Teams ====
Pos.	Car	Team	SIL (United Kingdom)	SPA (Belgium)	LMS (France)	NÜR (Germany)	MEX (Mexico)	COA (United States)	FUJ (Japan)	SHA (China)	BHR (Bahrain)	Total points
1	51	(Italy) AF Corse	2	2	7	1	6	1	1	3	2	164
2	67	(United States) Ford Chip Ganassi Racing UK	**1**	4	2	5	4	7	8	1	3	146
3	91	(Germany) Porsche GT Team	3	5	3	2	3	6	**2**	2	4	145
4	71	(Italy) AF Corse	5	**1**	4	8	**2**	**3**	5	6	**1**	143
5	95	(United Kingdom) Aston Martin Racing	6	8	5	4	1	4	7	**5**	7	104
6	97	(United Kingdom) Aston Martin Racing	7	7	**1**	7	Ret	5	6	7	6	101
7	66	(United States) Ford Chip Ganassi Racing UK	4	3	6	6	7	8	4	4	5	95
8	92	(Germany) Porsche GT Team	Ret	6	Ret	**3**	5	2	3	Ret	Ret	67

==== Endurance Trophy for LMGTE Am Teams ====
Pos.	Car	Team	SIL (United Kingdom)	SPA (Belgium)	LMS (France)	NÜR (Germany)	MEX (Mexico)	COA (United States)	FUJ (Japan)	SHA (China)	BHR (Bahrain)	Total points
1	98	(United Kingdom) Aston Martin Racing	**2**	**1**	**3**	**3**	2	**1**	5	**1**	**1**	198
2	61	(Singapore) Clearwater Racing	1	3	1	4	5	2	**2**	4	2	179
3	77	(Germany) Dempsey-Proton Racing	3	2	2	1	**1**	4	3	3	4	174
4	54	(Switzerland) Spirit of Race	Ret	4	5	2	4	3	1	Ret	3	117
5	86	(United Kingdom) Gulf Racing	4	Ret	4	5	3	Ret	4	2	5	101
