= Marvin Dienst =

German racing driver

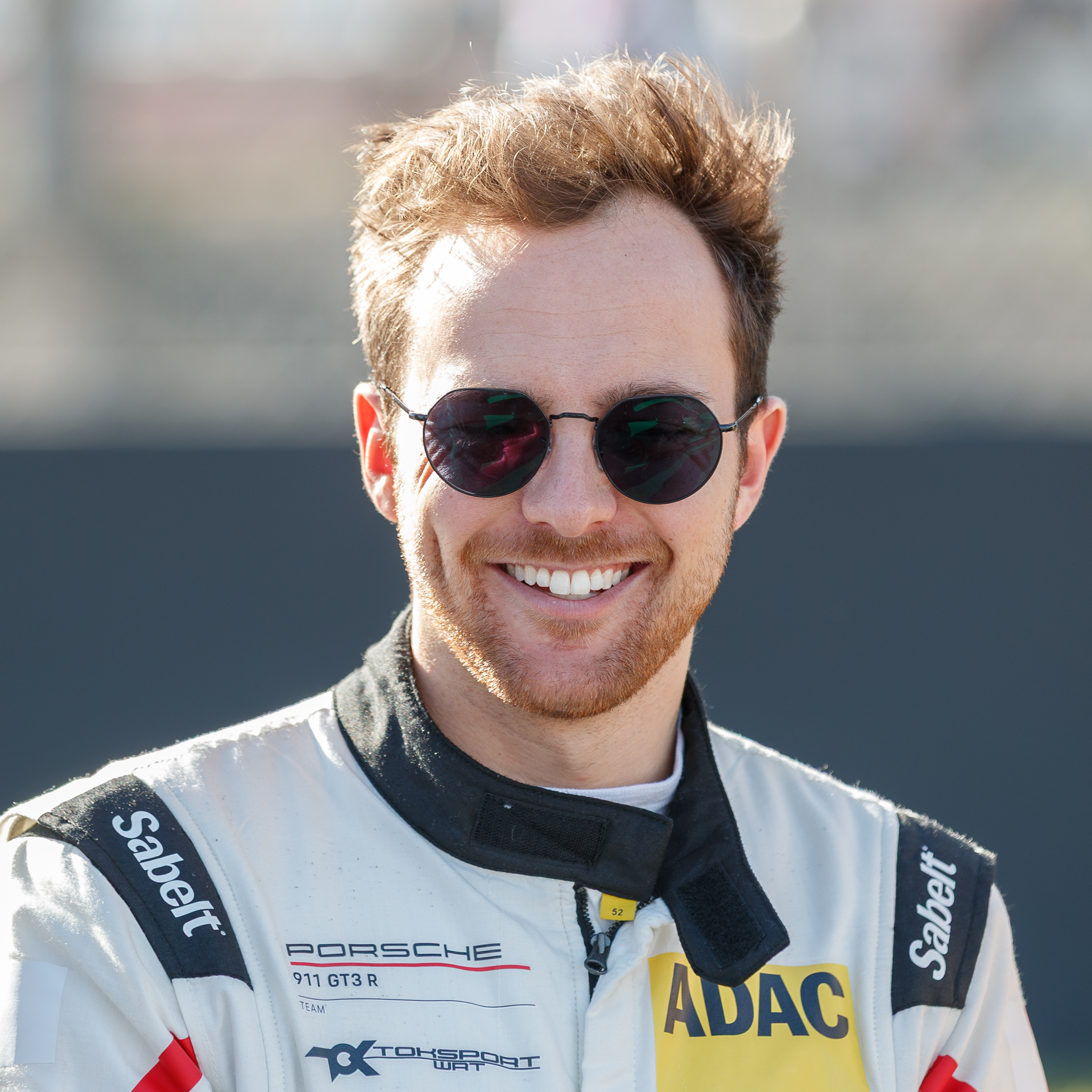
- Dienst in 2023
- Nationality: (Germany) German
- Born: 24 February 1997 (age 29) Worms, Germany

ADAC GT Masters career
- Debut season: 2016
- Categorisation: FIA Silver (until 2022); FIA Gold (2023–)
- Car number: 36
- Former teams: Schütz Motorsport
- Starts: 41
- Wins: 1
- Podiums: 2
- Poles: 2
- Fastest laps: 1
- Best finish: 14th in 2016

FIA World Endurance Championship career
- Debut season: 2017
- Car number: 77
- Former teams: Dempsey-Proton Racing
- Starts: 9
- Championships: 0
- Wins: 2
- Podiums: 6
- Poles: 1
- Fastest laps: 1
- Best finish: 2nd in 2017 (LMGTE Am)

24 Hours of Le Mans career
- Years: 2017
- Teams: Dempsey-Proton Racing
- Best finish: 34th (2017)
- Class wins: 0

Previous series
- 2021 2021 2020–21 2019–20 2019 2018 2017 2017 2016 2015 2015 2013–14 2012: Deutsche Tourenwagen Masters; Intercontinental GT Challenge; ADAC GT4 Germany; ADAC GT Masters; Nürburgring Endurance Series; European Le Mans Series; FIA World Endurance Championship; GT World Challenge Asia; ADAC GT Masters; ADAC Formula 4 FIA Formula 3 European Championship; ADAC Formel Masters; Formula BMW Talent Cup

Championship titles
- 2015 2012: ADAC Formula 4 Formula BMW Talent Cup

Awards
- 2017 2015: ADAC Junior Motor Sportsman of the Year; Deutsche Post Speed Academy

Marvin Christopher Dienst (German pronunciation: [ˈmaːʀˈvɪn ˈdiːnst]; born 24 February 1997) is a German racing driver who competes in GT World Challenge Europe for Winward Racing. A non-factory Mercedes-AMG and Porsche driver, Dienst is a race winner in WEC, ELMS and GTWCE, and briefly raced in DTM. He is the 2015 ADAC Formula 4 and 2022 Prototype Cup Germany champion.

== Career ==
=== Karting and early career ===
Dienst began karting in 2007, collecting his first major karting victory that year in the ADAC Kart Masters. He also won the Stefan-Bellof Pokal in 2009. He remained in karting until 2011. In 2012, he participated in the Formula BMW Talent Cup, a competition for junior drivers. He won the competition, earning sponsorship for 2013 for higher-level single-seater racing series'.

=== Formula 4 & 3 ===
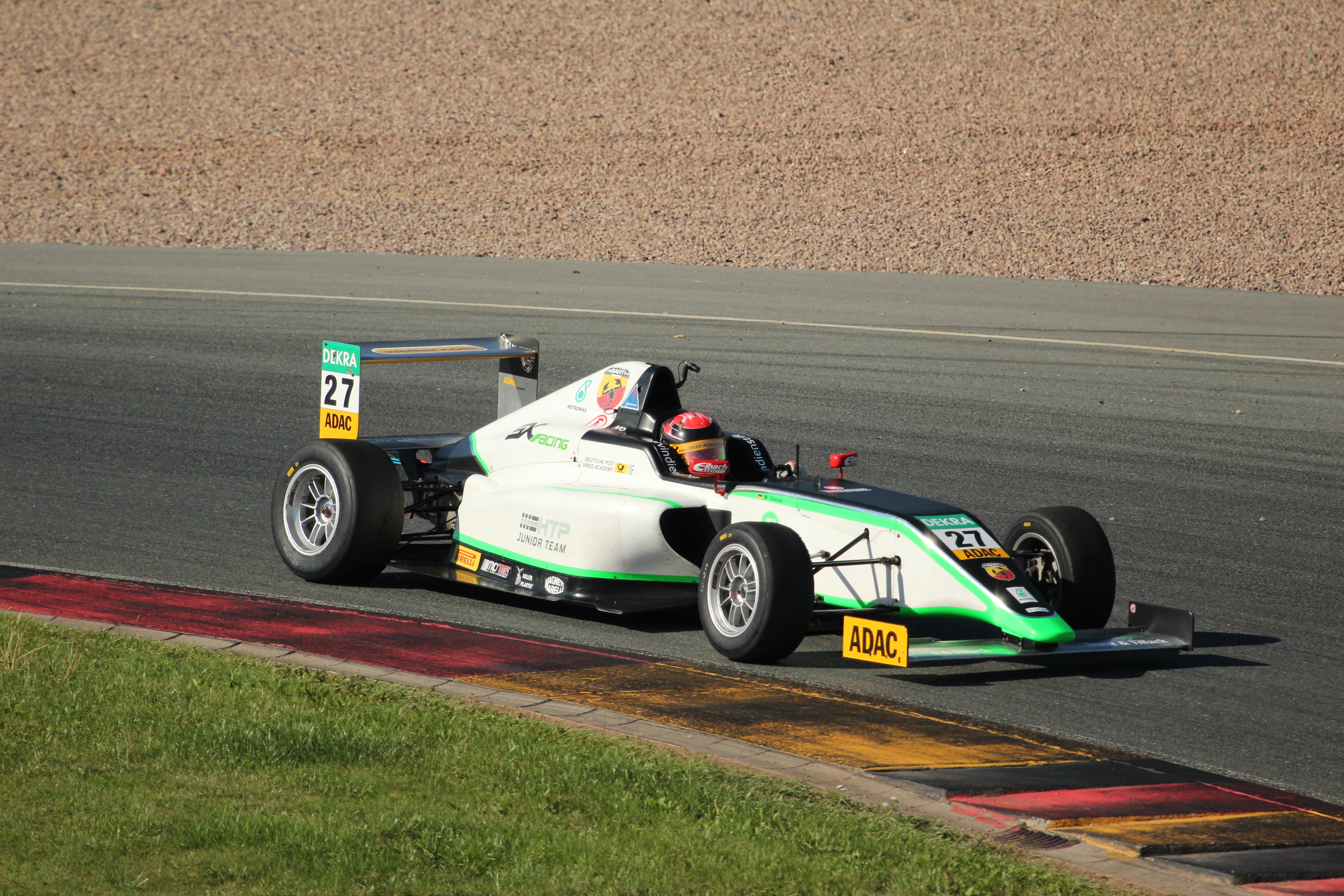
Dienst at the Sachsenring in the ADAC Formula 4 Championship in 2015.

In 2013, Dienst graduated to single seaters in ADAC Formel Masters, racing for Neuhauser Racing. He achieved eight podiums, including his first victory at the Automotodróm Slovakia Ring. He ended his debut season in fifth. Dienst went on to race for ADAC Berlin-Brandenburg in his second season, winning three races and achieving seven podiums, improving his championship rank to fourth. In 2015, he participated in the inaugural season of the ADAC Formula 4 Championship, which replaced the ADAC Formel Masters. Racing for the HTP Junior Team, Dienst won the championship, thus becoming first champion of the German Formula 4 championship. Dienst also started three races in the 2015 FIA Formula 3 European Championship for Artline Engineering as a guest driver.

=== Later career ===
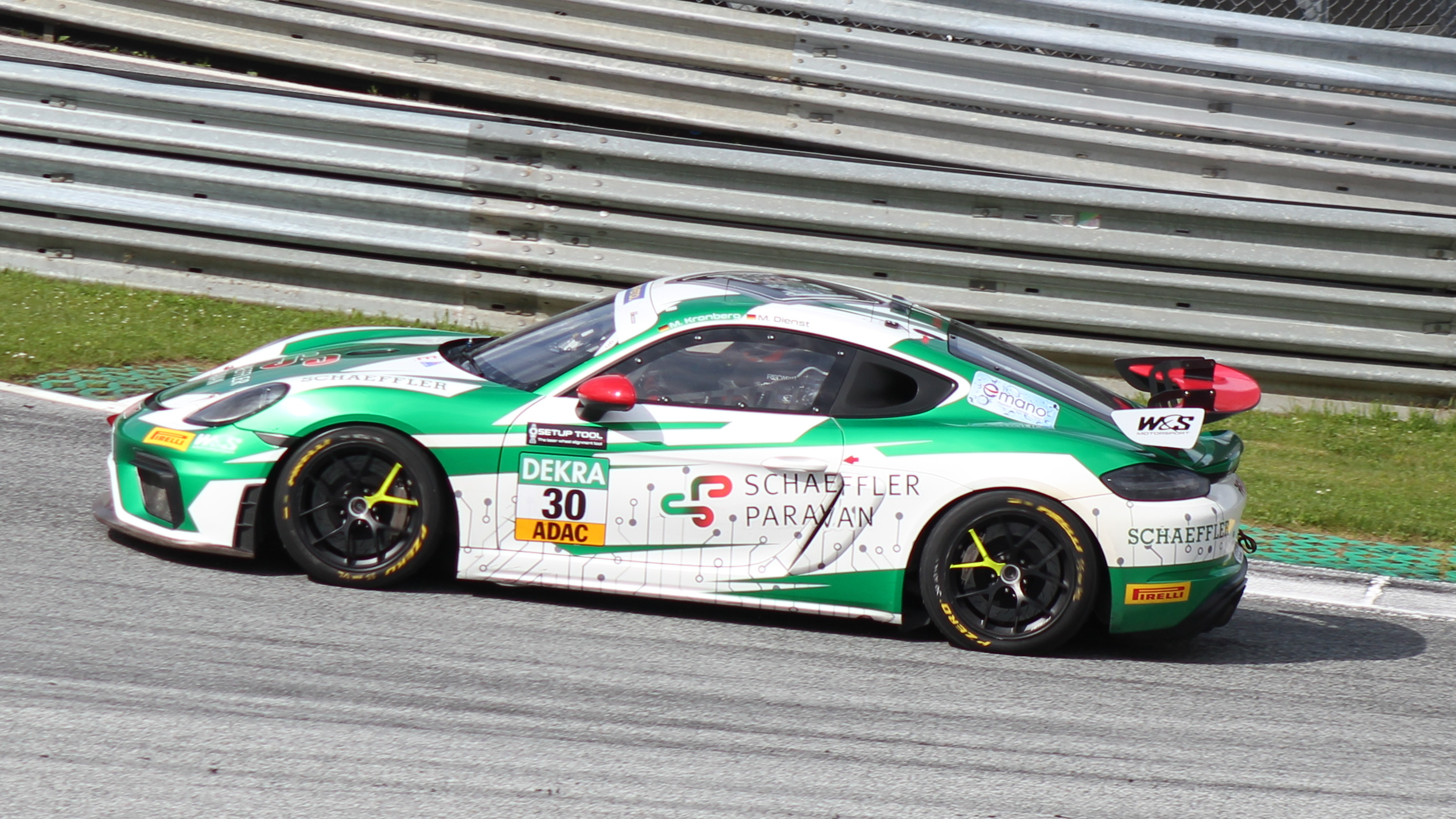
Dienst in 2021.

In 2016, Dienst participated in the ADAC GT Masters for Schütz Motorsport. In the penultimate round at the Hockenheimring, he was able to achieve a podium finish for the first time. He scored a total of 51 points, and placed 14th in the drivers' classification and fifth in the junior classification.

In 2017, Dienst drove for the Dempsey-Proton Racing team in the FIA World Endurance Championship, in the LMGTE Am class. In addition, he made a guest appearance for Craft-Bamboo Racing in the GT World Challenge Asia in Shanghai. Here he finished race 1 in sixth place and won race 2 with his teammate Darryl O'Young. This was their first victory with Porsche in the GT3 class.

In 2018, Dienst participated in the European Le Mans Series in the GTE class for Proton Competition.

Dienst again competed in the ADAC GT Masters in 2019 and 2020. He has since gone on to compete in the ADAC GT4 Germany, Nürburgring Endurance Series, Deutsche Tourenwagen Masters and the Intercontinental GT Challenge.

== Karting record ==
=== Karting career summary ===
Season	Series	Team	Position
2007	Champions Cup — Super Mini		3rd
2007	ADAC Kart Masters — Bambini B		1st
2008	ADAC Kart Masters — Bambini A		16th
2009	Stefan-Bellof Pokal		1st
2009	ADAC Kart Bundesendlauf — KF3		2nd
2010	ADAC Kart Masters — KF3		7th
2010	ADAC Kart Championship — KF3		7th
2010	German Karting Championship — Junior		19th
2010	Monaco Kart Club — KF3	Solgat Motorsport	27th
2011	ADAC Kart Masters — KF3		4th
2011	German Karting Championship — Junior	Solgat Motorsport	5th

== Racing record ==
=== Racing career summary ===
Season	Series	Team	Races	Wins	Poles	F/Laps	Podiums	Points	Position
2012	Formula BMW Talent Cup	—N/a	3	1	0	0	2	42	**1st**
2013	ADAC Formel Masters	Neuhauser Racing	24	1	0	4	8	186	5th
2014	ADAC Formel Masters	ADAC Berlin-Brandenburg	24	3	2	2	7	205	4th
2015	ADAC Formula 4 Championship	HTP Junior Team	24	8	7	6	14	347	**1st**
2015	FIA Formula 3 European Championship	Artline Engineering	3	0	0	0	0	0	NC†
2016	ADAC GT Masters	BigFM Racing Team Schütz Motorsport	14	0	0	0	1	51	14th
2017	FIA World Endurance Championship - GTE Am	Dempsey-Proton Racing	9	2	1	1	6	168	**2nd**
2017	GT World Challenge Asia	Craft-Bamboo Racing	2	1	0	0	1	35	15th
2017	24 Hours of Le Mans - GTE Am	Dempsey-Proton Racing	1	0	0	0	0	N/A	6th
2018	European Le Mans Series	Proton Competition	6	1	0	0	2	83	4th
2019	ADAC GT Masters	Schütz Motorsport	14	0	1	1	0	46	20th
2019	Nürburgring Endurance Series	Overdrive Racing	1	0	0	0	0	0	NC
2019	24H GT Series - A6	Attempto Racing							
2020	ADAC GT Masters	Schütz Motorsport	13	1	1	0	1	53	20th
2020	ADAC GT4 Germany	Schütz Motorsport	8	0	1	1	0	20	21st
2020	24 Hours of Nürburgring - SP7	W&S Motorsport	1	0	0	0	1	N/A	**2nd**
2021	ADAC GT4 Germany	W&S Motorsport	4	0	0	0	0	0	NC
2021	Deutsche Tourenwagen Masters	Mercedes-AMG Team Mücke Motorsport	2	0	0	0	0	6	19th
2021	Intercontinental GT Challenge	Toksport WRT	1	0	0	0	0	2	20th
2021	Intercontinental GT Challenge	Winward Racing	1	0	0	0	0	2	20th
2021	GT World Challenge Europe Endurance Cup	Toksport WRT	5	0	0	0	0	1	32nd
2021	GT World Challenge Europe Endurance Cup - Silver	Toksport WRT	5	0	1	0	3	58	6th
2022	Prototype Cup Germany	Toksport WRT	8	4	0	0	5	111.5	**1st**
2022	GT World Challenge Europe Endurance Cup	Toksport WRT	1	0	0	0	0	0	NC
2022	Intercontinental GT Challenge	Toksport WRT							
2022	IMSA SportsCar Championship - GTD	Winward Racing	2	0	0	0	0	658	34th
2022	ADAC GT Masters	Mercedes-AMG Team zvo	6	1	0	0	1	48	24th
2022	24H GT Series - GT3	Dinamic Motorsport							
2022	24 Hours of Nürburgring - SP9	Mercedes-AMG Team Bilstein by HRT	1	0	0	0	0	N/A	8th
2023	Deutsche Tourenwagen Masters	Toksport WRT	8	0	0	0	0	11	27th
2024	GT World Challenge Europe Sprint Cup	Dinamic GT	2	0	0	0	0	0	NC
2024	GT World Challenge Europe Sprint Cup - Bronze	Dinamic GT	2	1	1	2	1	18.5	11th
2024	GT World Challenge Europe Endurance Cup	Dinamic GT	2	0	0	0	0	0	NC
2024	GT World Challenge Europe Endurance Cup - Bronze	Dinamic GT	2	0	0	0	0	0	NC
2024	Nürburgring Langstrecken-Serie - SP9	Dinamic GT							
2024	Intercontinental GT Challenge	Dinamic GT							
2024	24 Hours of Nürburgring - SP9	Dinamic GT	1	0	0	0	0	N/A	13th
2025	GT World Challenge Europe Endurance Cup	Winward Racing	5	0	0	0	0	0	NC
2025	GT World Challenge Europe Endurance Cup - Bronze	Winward Racing	5	0	0	0	2	61	4th
2025	GT World Challenge Europe Sprint Cup	Winward Racing	4	0	0	0	0	0	NC
2025	GT World Challenge Europe Sprint Cup - Bronze	Winward Racing	4	1	0	0	3	38.5	5th
2025	Gulf 12 Hours	Winward Racing	1	0	0	0	0	N/A	5th
2025–26	24H Series Middle East - GT3	Winward Racing							
2026	GT World Challenge Europe Endurance Cup	Winward Racing	5	0	0	0	0	0	NC
2026	GT World Challenge Europe Endurance Cup - Bronze	Winward Racing	5	0	1	0	3	76	4th
2026	GT World Challenge Europe Sprint Cup	Winward Racing	8	0	0	0	0	0	NC
2026	GT World Challenge Europe Sprint Cup - Bronze	Winward Racing	8	2	0	2	5	83	**2nd**
2026–27	Asian Le Mans Series - GT3	Winward Racing							

^{†} As Dienst was a guest driver, he was ineligible for championship points.
^{*} Season still in progress.

=== Complete ADAC Formel Masters/Formula 4 Championship results ===
(key) (Races in bold indicate pole position) (Races in italics indicate fastest lap)

Year	Team	1	2	3	4	5	6	7	8	9	10	11	12	13	14	15	16	17	18	19	20	21	22	23	24	DC	Points
2013	Neuhauser Racing	OSC; 1; 7	OSC; 2; 5	OSC; 3; 3	SPA; 1; 11	SPA; 2; 5	SPA; 3 Ret	SAC; 1; 9	SAC; 2; 2	SAC; 3; 5	NÜR; 1; 7	NÜR; 2; 5	NÜR; 3; 2	RBR; 1; 7	RBR; 2; 12	RBR; 3; 6	LAU; 1; 15	LAU; 2; 3	LAU; 3; 5	SVK; 1; 2	SVK; 2; 1	SVK; 3; 2	HOC; 1 Ret	HOC; 2; 3	HOC; 3 Ret	5th	171
2014	ADAC Berlin-Brandenburg	OSC; 1 Ret	OSC; 2; 3	OSC; 3; 7	ZAN; 1; 5	ZAN; 2; 5	ZAN; 3; 1	**LAU**; **1**; 2	**LAU**; **2**; 1	LAU; 3; 4	RBR; 1; 6	RBR; 2 Ret	RBR; 3; 7	SVK; 1; 9	SVK; 2; 10	SVK; 3; 9	NÜR; 1; 2	NÜR; 2; 1	NÜR; 3; 4	SAC; 1; 9	SAC; 2; 6	'SAC; 3; 2	HOC; 1; 9	HOC; 2; 6	HOC; 3; 7	4th	205
2015	HTP Junior Team	OSC1; 1; 1	**OSC1**; **2**; 1	OSC1; 3; 6	RBR; 1 Ret	RBR; 2; 3	RBR; 3; 20	SPA; 1 Ret	SPA; 2; 6	SPA; 3; 14	**LAU**; **1**; 3	**LAU**; **2**; 6	LAU; 3; 1	NÜR; 1; 1	NÜR; 2; 1	NÜR; 3; 3	**SAC**; **1**; 1	**SAC**; **2**; 1	SAC; 3; 2	OSC2; 1; 2	OSC2; 2; 2	OSC2; 3; 4	**HOC**; **1**; 1	**HOC**; **2**; 4	HOC; 3 Ret	1st	347

=== Complete FIA Formula 3 European Championship results ===
(key) (Races in bold indicate pole position) (Races in italics indicate fastest lap)

Year	Entrant	Engine	1	2	3	4	5	6	7	8	9	10	11	12	13	14	15	16	17	18	19	20	21	22	23	24	25	26	27	28	29	30	31	32	33	DC	Points
2015	Artline Engineering	NBE	SIL; 1	SIL; 2	SIL; 3	HOC; 1	HOC; 2	HOC; 3	PAU; 1	PAU; 2	PAU; 3	MNZ; 1	MNZ; 2	MNZ; 3	SPA; 1	SPA; 2	SPA; 3	NOR; 1	NOR; 2	NOR; 3	ZAN; 1	ZAN; 2	ZAN; 3	RBR; 1	RBR; 2	RBR; 3	ALG; 1	ALG; 2	ALG; 3	NÜR; 1	NÜR; 2	NÜR; 3	HOC; 1; 27	HOC; 2; 25	HOC; 3 Ret	NC‡	0‡

^{‡} As Dienst was a guest driver, he was ineligible for points.

=== Complete ADAC GT Masters results ===
(key) (Races in bold indicate pole position) (Races in italics indicate fastest lap)

Year	Team	Car	1	2	3	4	5	6	7	8	9	10	11	12	13	14	DC	Points
2016	BigFM Racing Team Schütz Motorsport	Porsche 911 GT3 R	OSC; 1; 17	OSC; 1; 26	SAC; 1; 16	SAC; 2; 11	LAU; 1; 11	LAU; 2; 5	RBR; 1; 16	RBR; 2 Ret	NÜR; 1; 26	NÜR; 2; 8	ZAN; 1; 4	ZAN; 2 Ret	HOC; 1; 3	HOC; 2; 5	14th	51
2019	Schütz Motorsport	Mercedes-AMG GT3	**OSC**; **1**; 5	OSC; 1 DSQ	MST; 1; 6	MST; 2; 13	RBR; 1; 18	RBR; 2; 14	ZAN; 1 Ret	ZAN; 2; 24	NÜR; 1; 15	NÜR; 2; 14	HOC; 1; 23	HOC; 2; 11	SAC; 1; 8	SAC; 2; 14	20th	46
2020	Schütz Motorsport	Mercedes-AMG GT3	LAU; 1; 9	LAU; 1; 13	NÜR; 1; 9	NÜR; 2; 25	HOC; 1; 19	HOC; 2 Ret	**SAC**; **1**; 1	SAC; 2 Ret	RBR; 1 Ret	RBR; 2 DNS	ZAN; 1; 14	ZAN; 2; 7	OSC; 1 DSQ	OSC; 2; 16	20th	53
2022	Mercedes-AMG Team zvo	Mercedes-AMG GT3 Evo	OSC; 1	OSC; 2	RBR; 1	RBR; 2	ZAN; 1	ZAN; 2	NÜR; 1	NÜR; 2	LAU; 1; 20†	LAU; 2; 8	SAC; 1; 4	SAC; 2; 1	HOC; 1; 14	HOC; 2 Ret	24th	48

=== Complete FIA World Endurance Championship results ===
(key) (Races in bold indicate pole position) (Races in italics indicate fastest lap)

Year	Entrant	Class	Car	Engine	1	2	3	4	5	6	7	8	9	Rank	Points
2017	Dempsey-Proton Racing	LMGTE Am	Porsche 911 RSR	Porsche 4.0 L Flat-6	SIL; 3	SPA; 2	LMS; 3	NÜR; 1	**MEX**; 1	COA; 4	FUJ; 3	SHA; 3	BHR; 4	2nd	168

=== 24 Hours of Le Mans results ===
Year	Team	Co-Drivers	Car	Class	Laps	Pos.	Class Pos.
2017	(Germany) Dempsey-Proton Racing	(Germany) Christian Ried (Italy) Matteo Cairoli	Porsche 911 RSR	GTE; Am	329	34th	6th

=== Complete European Le Mans Series results ===
(key) (Races in bold indicate pole position) (Races in italics indicate fastest lap)

Year	Entrant	Class	Chassis	Engine	1	2	3	4	5	6	Rank	Points
2018	Proton Competition	LMGTE	Porsche 911 RSR	Porsche 4.0 L Flat-6	LEC; 5	MNZ; 2	RBR; 4	**SIL**; 4	SPA; 5	ALG; 1	4th	83

=== Complete Deutsche Tourenwagen Masters results ===
(key) (Races in bold indicate pole position) (Races in italics indicate fastest lap)

Year	Team	Car	1	2	3	4	5	6	7	8	9	10	11	12	13	14	15	16	Pos	Points
2021	Mercedes-AMG Team Mücke Motorsport	Mercedes-AMG GT3 Evo	MNZ; 1	MNZ; 2	LAU; 1	LAU; 2	ZOL; 1	ZOL; 2	NÜR; 1	NÜR; 2	RBR; 1	RBR; 2	ASS; 1	ASS; 2	HOC; 1; 11	HOC; 2; 7	NOR; 1	NOR; 2	19th	6
2023	Toksport WRT	Porsche 911 GT3 R (992)	OSC; 1	OSC; 2	ZAN; 1	ZAN; 2	NOR; 1	NOR; 2	NÜR; 1	NÜR; 2	LAU; 1; 18	LAU; 2; 12	SAC; 1; 15	SAC; 2 Ret	RBR; 1; 22	RBR; 2; 14	HOC; 1; 13	HOC; 2; 18	27th	11

=== Complete GT World Challenge Europe results ===
==== GT World Challenge Europe Endurance Cup ====
(key) (Races in bold indicate pole position) (Races in italics indicate fastest lap)

Year	Team	Car	Class	1	2	3	4	5	6	7	Pos.	Points
2021	Toksport WRT	Mercedes-AMG GT3 Evo	Silver	MNZ; 20	LEC; Ret	SPA; 6H; 33	SPA; 12H; 21	SPA; 24H; 13	NÜR; 10	**CAT**; 14	13th	42
2022	Toksport WRT	Porsche 911 GT3 R	Pro	IMO	LEC	SPA; 6H; 23	SPA; 12H; 16	SPA; 24H; Ret	HOC	CAT	NC	0
2024	Dinamic GT	Porsche 911 GT3 R (992)	Bronze	LEC; 35	SPA; 6H; Ret	SPA; 12H; Ret	SPA; 24H; Ret	NÜR	MNZ	JED	NC	0
2025	Winward Racing	Mercedes-AMG GT3 Evo	Bronze	LEC; 33	MNZ; 14	SPA; 6H; 38	SPA; 12H; 26	SPA; 24H; 17	NÜR; 41	CAT; Ret	4th	61
2026	Winward Racing	Mercedes-AMG GT3 Evo	Bronze	LEC; 22	**MNZ**; 35†	SPA; 6H; 40	SPA; 12H; 31	SPA; 24H; 21	NÜR; 25	ALG; 18	4th	76

==== GT World Challenge Europe Sprint Cup ====
(key) (Races in bold indicate pole position) (Races in italics indicate fastest lap)

Year	Team	Car	Class	1	2	3	4	5	6	7	8	Pos.	Points
2024	Dinamic GT	Porsche 911 GT3 R (992)	Bronze	**MIS**; **1**; 14	MIS; 2; 20	HOC; 1	HOC; 2	MAG; 1	MAG; 2	CAT; 1	CAT; 2	11th	18.5
2025	Winward Racing	Mercedes-AMG GT3 Evo	Bronze	ZAN; 1	ZAN; 2	MIS; 1	MIS; 2	MAG; 1; 27	MAG; 2; 23	VAL; 1; 16	VAL; 2; 34	5th	38.5
2026	Winward Racing	Mercedes-AMG GT3 Evo	Bronze	MIS; 1; 23	MIS; 2; 24	MAG; 1; 17	MAG; 2; 36	ZAN; 1; 24	ZAN; 2; 34	CAT; 1; 17	CAT; 2; 23	2nd	83

=== Complete IMSA SportsCar Championship results ===
(key) (Races in bold indicate pole position) (Races in italics indicate fastest lap)

Year	Team	Class	Make	Engine	1	2	3	4	5	6	7	8	9	10	11	12	Rank	Points
2022	Winward Racing	GTD	Mercedes-AMG GT3 Evo	Mercedes-AMG M159 6.2 L V8	DAY	SEB; 12	LBH	LGA	MDO	DET	WGL; 11	MOS	LIM	ELK	VIR	PET; 11	34th	658

=== Complete Asian Le Mans Series results ===
(key) (Races in bold indicate pole position) (Races in italics indicate fastest lap)

Year	Team	Class	Car	Engine	1	2	3	4	5	6	Pos.	Points
2026–27	Winward Racing	GT	Mercedes-AMG GT3 Evo	Mercedes-AMG M159 6.2 L V8	LEC; 1; 8	LEC; 2; 4	JER; 1	JER; 2	ALG; 1	ALG; 2	5th*	16*
