= Keita Sawa =

Japanese racing driver

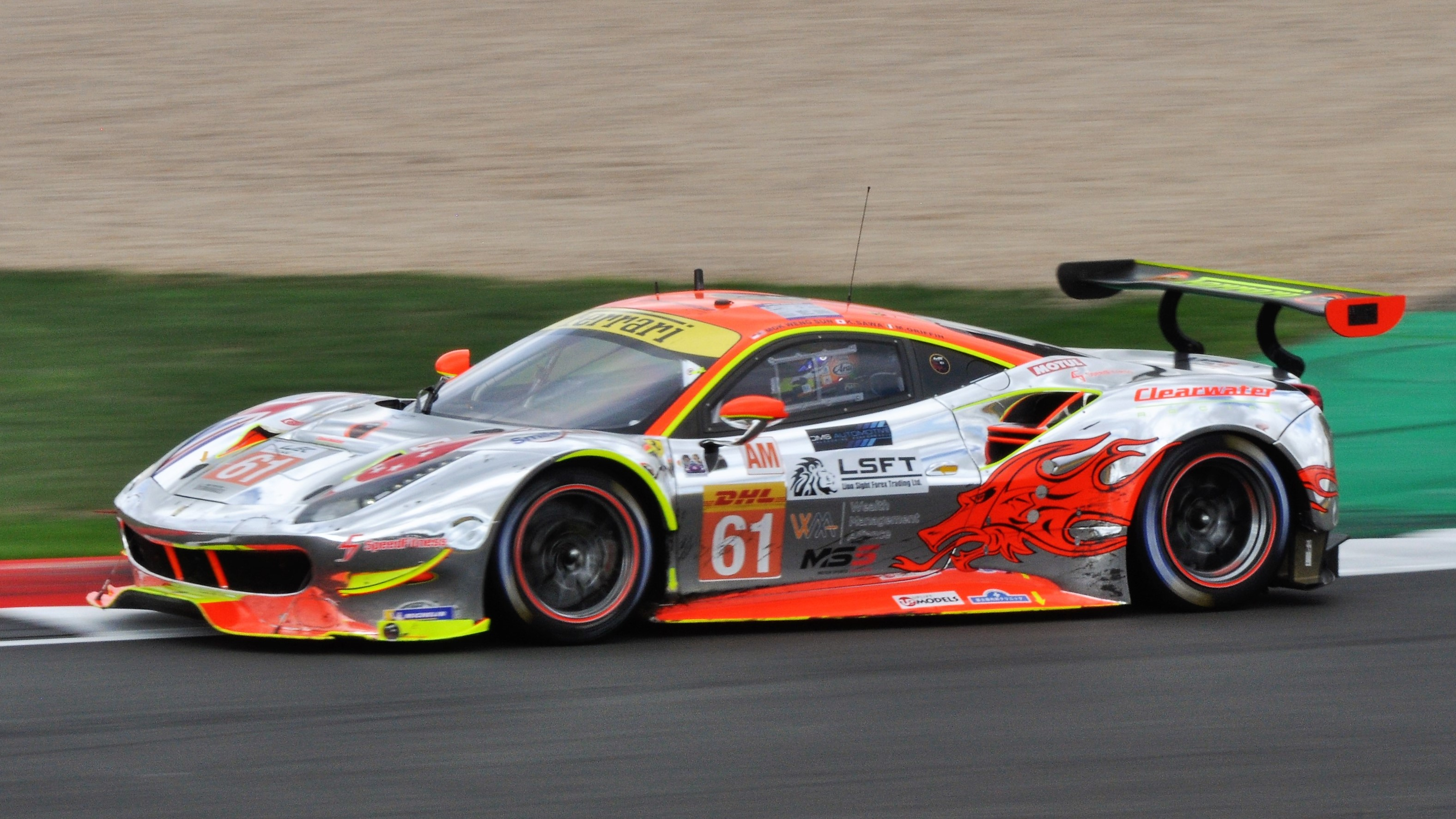
- Sawa in 2018
- Nationality: (Japan) Japanese
- Born: 16 August 1976 (age 50) Chiba, Japan
- Categorisation: FIA Silver

Championship titles
- 2011 1999: Porsche Carrera Cup Asia; JAF Japan Formula 4

Keita Sawa (澤圭太, Sawa Keita; born August 16, 1976 in Chiba) is a Japanese racing driver.

== Racing record ==
=== Complete FIA World Endurance Championship results ===
Year	Team	Car	Car	1	2	3	4	5	6	7	8	9	DC	Pts
2016	Clearwater Racing	Ferrari 458 Itaria GT2	LMGTE Am	SIL	SPA	LMS; 4	NÜR	MEX	COA	FUJ	SHA	BHR	NC	0
2017	Clearwater Racing	Ferrari 488 GTE	LMGTE Am	SIL; 1	SPA; 3	LMS; 1	NÜR; 4	MEX; 5	COA; 2	FUJ; 2	SHA; 4	BHR; 2	2nd	179
2018–19	Clearwater Racing	Ferrari 488 GTE	LMGTE Am	SPA; 3	LMS; 4	SIL; 5	FUJ; 6	SHA; 7	SEB	SPA	LMS		10th	57
