= 2017 6 Hours of Mexico =

Endurance sports car racing event

Track layout of the Autódromo Hermanos Rodríguez

The 2017 WEC 6 Hours of Mexico was an endurance sports car racing event held at the Autódromo Hermanos Rodríguez, Mexico on 1–3 September 2017. The Autódromo Hermanos Rodríguez round served as the fifth race of the 2017 FIA World Endurance Championship. The race was won by the No. 2 Porsche entered by Porsche Motorsport. The LMP1 grid for the race was reduced, due to the absence of the ByKolles Racing Team.

== Qualifying ==
=== Qualifying result ===
Pole position winners in each class are marked in bold.

Pos	Class	Team	Times	Gap	Grid A
1	**LMP1**	**No.2 Porsche LMP Team**	**1:24.562**	—	**1**
2	LMP1	No.1 Porsche LMP Team	1:24.710	+0.148	2
3	LMP1	No.7 Toyota Gazoo Racing	1:24.802	+0.240	3
4	LMP1	No.8 Toyota Gazoo Racing	1:25.378	+0.816	4
5	**LMP2**	**No.36 Signatech Alpine Matmut**	**1:32.809**	**8.247**	**5**
6	LMP2	No.38 Jackie Chan DC Racing	1:33.105	+8.543	6
7	LMP2	No.31 Vaillante Rebellion	1:33.605	+9.043	7
8	LMP2	No.26 G-Drive Racing	1:34.002	+9.440	8
9	LMP2	No.25 CEFC Manor TRS Racing	1:34.051	+9.489	9
10	LMP2	No.37 Jackie Chan DC Racing	1:34.272	+9.710	10
11	LMP2	No.24 CEFC Manor TRS Racing	1:34.483	+9.921	11
12	LMP2	No.28 TDS Racing	1:35.365	+10.803	12
13	**LMGTE Pro**	**No.71 AF Corse**	**1:39.425**	**+14.863**	**13**
14	LMGTE Pro	No.95 Aston Martin Racing	1:39.534	+14.972	14
15	LMGTE Pro	No.67 Ford Chip Ganassi Team UK	1:39.640	+15.078	15
16	LMGTE Pro	No.66 Ford Chip Ganassi Team UK	1:39.728	+15.166	16
17	LMGTE Pro	No.97 Aston Martin Racing	1:39.851	+15.289	17
18	LMGTE Pro	No.92 Porsche GT Team	1:39.870	+15.308	18
19	LMGTE Pro	No.51 AF Corse	1:40.059	+15.497	19
20	LMGTE Pro	No.91 Porsche GT Team	1:40.252	+15.690	20
21	**LMGTE Am**	**No.77 Dempsey-Proton Racing**	**1:42.056**	**+17.494**	**21**
22	LMGTE Am	No.98 Aston Martin Racing	1:42.158	+17.596	22
23	LMGTE Am	No.86 Gulf Racing	1:42.965	+18.403	23
24	LMGTE Am	No.61 Clearwater Racing	1:43.296	+18.734	24
25	LMGTE Am	No.54 Spirit of Race	1:44.648	+20.086	25
26	LMP2	No.13 Vaillante Rebellion	1:33.407	+8.845	26

== Race ==
=== Race result ===
Class winners are denoted in bold.

Pos	Class	No	Team	Drivers	Chassis	Tyre	Laps	Time/Retired
Pos	Class	No	Team	Drivers	Engine	Tyre	Laps	Time/Retired
1	**LMP1**	**2**	**(Germany) Porsche LMP Team**	**(Germany) Timo Bernhard (New Zealand) Earl Bamber (New Zealand) Brendon Hartley**	**Porsche 919 Hybrid**	MI	**240**	**6:00:05.757**
1	**LMP1**	**2**	**(Germany) Porsche LMP Team**	**(Germany) Timo Bernhard (New Zealand) Earl Bamber (New Zealand) Brendon Hartley**	**Porsche 2.0 L Turbo V4**	MI	**240**	**6:00:05.757**
2	LMP1	1	(Germany) Porsche LMP Team	(Switzerland) Neel Jani (United Kingdom) Nick Tandy (Germany) André Lotterer	Porsche 919 Hybrid	MI	240	+7.141
2	LMP1	1	(Germany) Porsche LMP Team	(Switzerland) Neel Jani (United Kingdom) Nick Tandy (Germany) André Lotterer	Porsche 2.0 L Turbo V4	MI	240	+7.141
3	LMP1	8	(Japan) Toyota Gazoo Racing	(United Kingdom) Anthony Davidson (Switzerland) Sébastien Buemi (Japan) Kazuki Nakajima	Toyota TS050 Hybrid	MI	239	+1 Lap
3	LMP1	8	(Japan) Toyota Gazoo Racing	(United Kingdom) Anthony Davidson (Switzerland) Sébastien Buemi (Japan) Kazuki Nakajima	Toyota 2.4 L Turbo V6	MI	239	+1 Lap
4	LMP1	7	(Japan) Toyota Gazoo Racing	(United Kingdom) Mike Conway (Japan) Kamui Kobayashi (Argentina) José María López	Toyota TS050 Hybrid	MI	239	+1 Lap
4	LMP1	7	(Japan) Toyota Gazoo Racing	(United Kingdom) Mike Conway (Japan) Kamui Kobayashi (Argentina) José María López	Toyota 2.4 L Turbo V6	MI	239	+1 Lap
5	**LMP2**	**31**	**(Switzerland) Vaillante Rebellion**	**(France) Julien Canal (France) Nicolas Prost (Brazil) Bruno Senna**	**Oreca 07**	D	**219**	**+21 Laps**
5	**LMP2**	**31**	**(Switzerland) Vaillante Rebellion**	**(France) Julien Canal (France) Nicolas Prost (Brazil) Bruno Senna**	**Gibson GK428 4.2 L V8**	D	**219**	**+21 Laps**
6	LMP2	36	(France) Signatech Alpine Matmut	(France) Nicolas Lapierre (United States) Gustavo Menezes (Brazil) André Negrão	Alpine A470	D	219	+21 Laps
6	LMP2	36	(France) Signatech Alpine Matmut	(France) Nicolas Lapierre (United States) Gustavo Menezes (Brazil) André Negrão	Gibson GK428 4.2 L V8	D	219	+21 Laps
7	LMP2	24	(China) CEFC Manor TRS Racing	(United Kingdom) Matt Rao (United Kingdom) Ben Hanley (France) Jean-Éric Vergne	Oreca 07	D	219	+21 Laps
7	LMP2	24	(China) CEFC Manor TRS Racing	(United Kingdom) Matt Rao (United Kingdom) Ben Hanley (France) Jean-Éric Vergne	Gibson GK428 4.2 L V8	D	219	+21 Laps
8	LMP2	26	(Russia) G-Drive Racing	(Russia) Roman Rusinov (France) Pierre Thiriet (United Kingdom) Alex Lynn	Oreca 07	D	219	+21 Laps
8	LMP2	26	(Russia) G-Drive Racing	(Russia) Roman Rusinov (France) Pierre Thiriet (United Kingdom) Alex Lynn	Gibson GK428 4.2 L V8	D	219	+21 Laps
9	LMP2	13	(Switzerland) Vaillante Rebellion	(Switzerland) Mathias Beche (Denmark) David Heinemeier Hansson (Brazil) Nelson Piquet Jr.	Oreca 07	D	218	+22 Laps
9	LMP2	13	(Switzerland) Vaillante Rebellion	(Switzerland) Mathias Beche (Denmark) David Heinemeier Hansson (Brazil) Nelson Piquet Jr.	Gibson GK428 4.2 L V8	D	218	+22 Laps
10	LMP2	37	(China) Jackie Chan DC Racing	(United States) David Cheng (United Kingdom) Alex Brundle (France) Tristan Gommendy	Oreca 07	D	218	+22 Laps
10	LMP2	37	(China) Jackie Chan DC Racing	(United States) David Cheng (United Kingdom) Alex Brundle (France) Tristan Gommendy	Gibson GK428 4.2 L V8	D	218	+22 Laps
11	LMP2	28	(France) TDS Racing	(France) François Perrodo (France) Matthieu Vaxiviere (France) Emmanuel Collard	Oreca 07	D	218	+22 Laps
11	LMP2	28	(France) TDS Racing	(France) François Perrodo (France) Matthieu Vaxiviere (France) Emmanuel Collard	Gibson GK428 4.2 L V8	D	218	+22 Laps
12	LMP2	25	(China) CEFC Manor TRS Racing	(Mexico) Roberto González (Switzerland) Simon Trummer (Russia) Vitaly Petrov	Oreca 07	D	217	+23 Laps
12	LMP2	25	(China) CEFC Manor TRS Racing	(Mexico) Roberto González (Switzerland) Simon Trummer (Russia) Vitaly Petrov	Gibson GK428 4.2 L V8	D	217	+23 Laps
13	LMP2	38	(China) Jackie Chan DC Racing	(Netherlands) Ho-Pin Tung (United Kingdom) Oliver Jarvis (France) Thomas Laurent	Oreca 07	D	211	+29 Laps
13	LMP2	38	(China) Jackie Chan DC Racing	(Netherlands) Ho-Pin Tung (United Kingdom) Oliver Jarvis (France) Thomas Laurent	Gibson GK428 4.2 L V8	D	211	+29 Laps
14	**LMGTE; Pro**	**95**	**(United Kingdom) Aston Martin Racing**	**(Denmark) Nicki Thiim (Denmark) Marco Sørensen**	**Aston Martin V8 Vantage GTE**	D	**209**	**+31 Laps**
14	**LMGTE; Pro**	**95**	**(United Kingdom) Aston Martin Racing**	**(Denmark) Nicki Thiim (Denmark) Marco Sørensen**	**Aston Martin 4.5 L V8**	D	**209**	**+31 Laps**
15	LMGTE; Pro	71	(Italy) AF Corse	(Italy) Davide Rigon (United Kingdom) Sam Bird	Ferrari 488 GTE	MI	209	+31 Laps
15	LMGTE; Pro	71	(Italy) AF Corse	(Italy) Davide Rigon (United Kingdom) Sam Bird	Ferrari F154CB 3.9 L Turbo V8	MI	209	+31 Laps
16	LMGTE; Pro	91	(Germany) Porsche GT Team	(Austria) Richard Lietz (France) Frédéric Makowiecki	Porsche 911 RSR	MI	208	+32 Laps
16	LMGTE; Pro	91	(Germany) Porsche GT Team	(Austria) Richard Lietz (France) Frédéric Makowiecki	Porsche 4.0 L Flat-6	MI	208	+32 Laps
17	LMGTE; Pro	67	(United States) Ford Chip Ganassi Team UK	(United Kingdom) Andy Priaulx (United Kingdom) Harry Tincknell	Ford GT	MI	207	+33 Laps
17	LMGTE; Pro	67	(United States) Ford Chip Ganassi Team UK	(United Kingdom) Andy Priaulx (United Kingdom) Harry Tincknell	Ford EcoBoost 3.5 L Turbo V6	MI	207	+33 Laps
18	LMGTE; Pro	92	(Germany) Porsche GT Team	(Denmark) Michael Christensen (France) Kévin Estre	Porsche 911 RSR	MI	207	+33 Laps
18	LMGTE; Pro	92	(Germany) Porsche GT Team	(Denmark) Michael Christensen (France) Kévin Estre	Porsche 4.0 L Flat-6	MI	207	+33 Laps
19	LMGTE; Pro	51	(Italy) AF Corse	(United Kingdom) James Calado (Italy) Alessandro Pier Guidi	Ferrari 488 GTE	MI	206	+34 Laps
19	LMGTE; Pro	51	(Italy) AF Corse	(United Kingdom) James Calado (Italy) Alessandro Pier Guidi	Ferrari F154CB 3.9 L Turbo V8	MI	206	+34 Laps
20	LMGTE; Pro	66	(United States) Ford Chip Ganassi Team UK	(Germany) Stefan Mücke (France) Olivier Pla	Ford GT	MI	205	+35 Laps
20	LMGTE; Pro	66	(United States) Ford Chip Ganassi Team UK	(Germany) Stefan Mücke (France) Olivier Pla	Ford EcoBoost 3.5 L Turbo V6	MI	205	+35 Laps
21	**LMGTE; Am**	**77**	**(Germany) Dempsey-Proton Racing**	**(Germany) Christian Ried (Italy) Matteo Cairoli (Germany) Marvin Dienst**	**Porsche 911 RSR**	D	**204**	**+36 Laps**
21	**LMGTE; Am**	**77**	**(Germany) Dempsey-Proton Racing**	**(Germany) Christian Ried (Italy) Matteo Cairoli (Germany) Marvin Dienst**	**Porsche 4.0 L Flat-6**	D	**204**	**+36 Laps**
22	LMGTE; Am	98	(United Kingdom) Aston Martin Racing	(Canada) Paul Dalla Lana (Portugal) Pedro Lamy (Austria) Mathias Lauda	Aston Martin V8 Vantage GTE	D	203	+37 Laps
22	LMGTE; Am	98	(United Kingdom) Aston Martin Racing	(Canada) Paul Dalla Lana (Portugal) Pedro Lamy (Austria) Mathias Lauda	Aston Martin 4.5 L V8	D	203	+37 Laps
23	LMGTE; Am	86	(United Kingdom) Gulf Racing UK	(United Kingdom) Michael Wainwright (United Kingdom) Ben Barker (Australia) Nick Foster	Porsche 911 RSR	D	203	+37 Laps
23	LMGTE; Am	86	(United Kingdom) Gulf Racing UK	(United Kingdom) Michael Wainwright (United Kingdom) Ben Barker (Australia) Nick Foster	Porsche 4.0 L Flat-6	D	203	+37 Laps
24	LMGTE; Am	54	(Switzerland) Spirit of Race	(Switzerland) Thomas Flohr (Italy) Francesco Castellacci (Spain) Miguel Molina	Ferrari 488 GTE	MI	209	+39 Laps
24	LMGTE; Am	54	(Switzerland) Spirit of Race	(Switzerland) Thomas Flohr (Italy) Francesco Castellacci (Spain) Miguel Molina	Ferrari F154CB 3.9 L Turbo V8	MI	209	+39 Laps
25	LMGTE; Am	61	(Singapore) Clearwater Racing	(Singapore) Weng Sun Mok (Japan) Keita Sawa (Republic of Ireland) Matt Griffin	Ferrari 488 GTE	MI	199	+41 Laps
25	LMGTE; Am	61	(Singapore) Clearwater Racing	(Singapore) Weng Sun Mok (Japan) Keita Sawa (Republic of Ireland) Matt Griffin	Ferrari F154CB 3.9 L Turbo V8	MI	199	+41 Laps
DNF	LMGTE; Pro	97	(United Kingdom) Aston Martin Racing	(United Kingdom) Darren Turner (United Kingdom) Jonathan Adam (Brazil) Daniel Serra	Aston Martin V8 Vantage GTE	D	83	
DNF	LMGTE; Pro	97	(United Kingdom) Aston Martin Racing	(United Kingdom) Darren Turner (United Kingdom) Jonathan Adam (Brazil) Daniel Serra	Aston Martin 4.5 L V8	D	83	
