= 2009 TC 2000 Championship =

Seasons
- ← 2008 2010 →

The 2009 TC 2000 Championship was the 31st Turismo Competicion 2000 season. It began on April 5 and ended on November 29 after 12 races. José María López won his second successive title for Equipo Petrobras.

== Teams and drivers ==
Team	Car	No	Drivers	Notes
Equipo Petrobras	Honda New Civic	1	(Argentina) José María López	
Equipo Petrobras	Honda New Civic	1	(United Kingdom) Anthony Reid	Endurance Series races only
Equipo Petrobras	Honda New Civic	2	(Argentina) Juan Manuel Silva	
Equipo Petrobras	Honda New Civic	2	(Brazil) Cacá Bueno	Endurance Series races only
Equipo Petrobras	Honda New Civic	36	(Argentina) Leonel Pernía	
Equipo Petrobras	Honda New Civic	36	(Argentina) Agustín Canapino	Endurance Series races only
Chevrolet Elaion	Chevrolet Vectra	3	(Argentina) Guillermo Ortelli	
Chevrolet Elaion	Chevrolet Vectra	3	(Switzerland) Alain Menu	Endurance Series races only
Chevrolet Elaion	Chevrolet Vectra	4	(Argentina) Christian Ledesma	
Chevrolet Elaion	Chevrolet Vectra	4	(Uruguay) Juan Ignácio Cáceres	Endurance Series Termas de Río Hondo race only
Chevrolet Elaion	Chevrolet Vectra	4	(Argentina) José Ciantini	Endurance Series races only
Renault Lo Jack Team	Renault Mégane II	5	(Argentina) Matías Rossi	
Renault Lo Jack Team	Renault Mégane II	5	(Brazil) Thiago Camilo	Endurance Series races only
Renault Lo Jack Team	Renault Mégane II	6	(Argentina) Néstor Girolami	
Renault Lo Jack Team	Renault Mégane II	6	(Argentina) Esteban Guerrieri	Endurance Series races only
Ford-YPF	Ford Focus	7	(Argentina) Martín Basso	
Ford-YPF	Ford Focus	7	(Argentina) Lionel Ugalde	Endurance Series races only
Ford-YPF	Ford Focus	8	(Argentina) Gabriel Ponce de León	
Ford-YPF	Ford Focus	8	(Brazil) Daniel Serra	Endurance Series races only
Toyota Team Argentina	Toyota Corolla	9	(Argentina) Norberto Fontana	
Toyota Team Argentina	Toyota Corolla	9	(Brazil) Ricardo Maurício	Endurance Series races only
Toyota Team Argentina	Toyota Corolla	10	(Argentina) Mariano Werner	
Toyota Team Argentina	Toyota Corolla	10	(Argentina) Carlos Okulovich	Endurance Series races only
DP-1 Team	Ford Focus	11	(Argentina) Luis José di Palma	
DP-1 Team	Ford Focus	11	(Argentina) Ricardo Risatti	Endurance Series races only
DP-1 Team	Ford Focus	12	(Argentina) Leandro Carducci	
DP-1 Team	Ford Focus	12	(Argentina) Alejandro González	Endurance Series races only
DP-1 Team	Ford Focus	40	(Argentina) Crispín Beitía	
DP-1 Team	Ford Focus	40	(Argentina) Nelson García	
DTA	Chevrolet Astra	16	(Argentina) Fabián Yannantuoni	
DTA	Chevrolet Astra	16	(Argentina) Fabián Flaqué	Endurance Series races only
DTA	Chevrolet Astra	17	(Argentina) Santiago Ventana	
DTA	Chevrolet Astra	17	(Argentina) Jorge Trebbiani	Endurance Series races only
DTA	Chevrolet Astra	38	(Argentina) Matías Muñoz Marchesi	
DTA	Chevrolet Astra	38	(Argentina) Gabriel Furlán	Endurance Series races only
Escudería Río de la Plata	Honda New Civic	18	(Argentina) Bernardo Llaver	
Escudería Río de la Plata	Honda New Civic	18	(Argentina) Pablo Piumetto	
Escudería Río de la Plata	Honda New Civic	19	(Argentina) Fabricio Pezzini	Rounds 1–4
Escudería Río de la Plata	Honda New Civic	19	(Argentina) Marcelo Bugliotti	Round 7-onwards
Escudería Río de la Plata	Honda New Civic	19	(Argentina) Damián Fineschi	Endurance Series Termas de Río Hondo race only
Basalto TTA	Toyota Corolla	20	(Argentina) Franco Coscia	
Basalto TTA	Toyota Corolla	20	(Argentina) Rafael Morgenstern	Endurance Series races only
Basalto TTA	Toyota Corolla	21	(Argentina) Emanuel Moriatis	
Basalto TTA	Toyota Corolla	21	(Argentina) Diego Aventín	Endurance Series races only
Lanus Motorsport	Honda Civic	22	(Argentina) Daniel Belli	
Lanus Motorsport	Honda Civic	22	(Argentina) Matías Cohen	Endurance Series races only
Fineschi Racing	Honda Civic	24	(Argentina) Damian Fineschi	Rounds 1–4, 6-onwards
Fineschi Racing	Honda Civic	24	(Argentina) German Suarez	Endurance Series races only
Fineschi Racing	Honda Civic	25	(Argentina) Marcelo Julián	
Fineschi Racing	Honda Civic	25	(Argentina) Julio Francischetti	Endurance Series races only
Fineschi Racing	Honda Civic	42	(Argentina) Néstor Riva	Round 4-onwards
Fineschi Racing	Honda Civic	42	(Argentina) Omar El Bacha	Endurance Series races only
JM Motorsport	Volkswagen Bora	26	(Argentina) Rubén Salerno	
JM Motorsport	Volkswagen Bora	26	(Argentina) Ricky Joseph	Endurance Series races only
JM Motorsport	Volkswagen Bora	27	(Argentina) Gustavo der Ohanessian	Rounds 1, 5, 7-onwards
JM Motorsport	Volkswagen Bora	27	(Argentina) Gerardo Martín	Rounds 2, 3, 4, 6
JM Motorsport	Volkswagen Bora	27	(Argentina) Adrián Chiriano	Endurance Series races only
Mendoza Motorsport	Volkswagen Bora	28	(Argentina) Gerardo Martín	Not raced – Martín ran 4 races in JM Motorsport
BAR Competición	Honda Civic	30	(Argentina) José Luís Raponi	Not raced
Malta Advanced Racing Team	Honda New Civic	32	(France) Carlos Banfi	
Malta Advanced Racing Team	Honda New Civic	32	(Argentina) Carlos De Ley	Endurance Series races only
Bainotti Racing	Honda Civic	34	(Argentina) Ezequiel Bosio	
Bainotti Racing	Honda Civic	34	(Argentina) Guillermo Albertengo	Endurance Series races only
Bainotti Racing	Honda Civic	35	(Argentina) Marcelo Bugliotti	Round 1
Bainotti Racing	Honda Civic	35	(Argentina) Ernesto Bessone	Rounds 2–4
Bainotti Racing	Honda Civic	35	(Argentina) Iván Saturni	Round 5-onwards
Bainotti Racing	Honda Civic	35	(Argentina) Diego Menendez	Endurance Series races only
Bainotti Racing	Honda Civic	44	(Argentina) Lucas Armellini	
Bainotti Racing	Honda Civic	44	(Argentina) Andres Rios	Endurance Series races only
Fiat Pro Racing Team	Fiat Linea	46	(Argentina) Emiliano Spataro	
Fiat Pro Racing Team	Fiat Linea	46	(Brazil) Felipe Maluhy	Endurance Series races only
Fiat Pro Racing Team	Fiat Linea	47	(Argentina) Francisco Viel Bugliotti	Rounds 1–3
Fiat Pro Racing Team	Fiat Linea	47	(Argentina) Omar Martinez	Round 4-onwards
Fiat Pro Racing Team	Fiat Linea	47	(Argentina) Mariano Altuna	Endurance Series races only
FP Racing	Peugeot 307	48	(Argentina) Esteban Tuero	
FP Racing	Peugeot 307	48	(Argentina) Lucas Benamo	Endurance Series races only
FP Racing	Peugeot 307	49	(Argentina) Franco Berardi	Round 6-onwards
FP Racing	Peugeot 307	49	(Argentina) Henry Martin	Endurance Series races only
Neuquén Sport Group	Volkswagen Polo	51	(Argentina) Dario Delvas	Round 4-onwards
Neuquén Sport Group	Volkswagen Polo	51	(Argentina) Damián Cassino	Endurance Series races only
Vitelli Competición	Renault Mégane II	52	(Argentina) Maximiliano Baumgartner	Round 4-onwards
Vitelli Competición	Renault Mégane II	52	(Argentina) Ezequiel Baldinelli	Endurance Series races only

== Race calendar and results ==
Date	Race Name	Track	Location	Event type	Number of laps
April 5	(Argentina) Gran Premio Casinos de Córdoba	Autódromo Oscar Cabalén	Alta Gracia, Córdoba	Normal event	
April 19	(Argentina)	Autódromo Parque General Roca	General Roca, Río Negro	Normal event	
May 10	(Argentina)	Autódromo Ciudad de Oberá	Oberá, Misiones	Normal event	26
May 31	(Argentina)	Autódromo Jorge Ángel Pena	San Martín, Mendoza	Normal event	31
June 14	(Argentina)	Autódromo Termas de Río Hondo	Termas de Río Hondo, Santiago del Estero	Endurance Series race	70
July 5	(Argentina)	Autódromo Santiago Yaco Guarnieri	Resistencia, Chaco	Normal event	40
August 16	(Argentina) 200km de Buenos Aires	Autódromo Juan y Óscar Gálvez	Ciudad Autónoma de Buenos Aires	Endurance Series race	38
September 6	(Argentina)	Autódromo Parque Provincia del Neuquén	Centenario, Neuquén	Normal event	
October 3 and 4	(Argentina)	Streets of Santa Fé	Santa Fé	Double-header event	
October 24 and 25	(Argentina)	Autódromo El Zonda	San Juán	Double-header event	
November 8	(Uruguay) Gran Premio de Punta del Este	Punta del Este Street Circuit	Punta del Este, Uruguay	Normal event	Cancelled
November 29	(Argentina) Gran Premio Coronación	Circuito Potrero de los Funes	Potrero de los Funes, San Luis	Endurance Series race	48

== Championship standings ==
=== Top 10 ===
Position	Number	Driver	Car	Points
1	1	(Argentina) José María López	Honda New Civic	157
2	2	(Argentina) Juan Manuel Silva	Honda New Civic	127
3	36	(Argentina) Leonel Pernía	Honda New Civic	124
4	9	(Argentina) Norberto Fontana	Toyota Corolla	112
5	5	(Argentina) Matías Rossi	Renault Mégane II	106
6	10	(Argentina) Mariano Werner	Toyota Corolla	65
7	8	(Argentina) Gabriel Ponce de León	Ford Focus	53
8	3	(Argentina) Guillermo Ortelli	Chevrolet Vectra	37.5
9	21	(Argentina) Emanuel Moriatis	Toyota Corolla	34.5
10	47	(Argentina) Omar Martínez	Fiat Linea	34
