= Andrés Ríos =

Andrés Ríos may refer to:

- Daniel Andrés Ríos (born 1983), Argentine football striker
- Andrés Ríos (racing driver) (born 1983), Argentine racing driver
- Andrés Lorenzo Ríos (born 1989), Argentine football striker

== See also ==
- Andrés Manuel del Río (1764-1849), Spanish-Mexican scientist, naturalist and engineer
