= Potrero de los Funes Circuit =

Closed Argentine motorsports race track in San Luis

- Full Circuit (2008–2024)
- Location: Potrero de los Funes, San Luis, Argentina
- Opened: First: May 1978; 48 years ago Second: November 2008; 17 years ago
- Closed: First: August 1987; 39 years ago Second: February 2024; 2 years ago
- Major events: Former: FIA GT1 World Championship (2010–2011); FIA GT Championship (2008); Súper TC2000 (2008–2014, 2017–2018); Turismo Nacional (1978, 1980, 2018); Top Race V6 (2013–2014); Turismo Carretera (1978, 1987, 2009)

Full Circuit (2008–2024)
- Length: 6.270 km (3.896 mi)
- Turns: 22
- Race lap record: 2:14.173 ( (Netherlands) Yelmer Buurman, Corvette C6.R, 2011, GT1)

Original Circuit (1978–1987)
- Length: 6.206 km (3.856 mi)
- Turns: 18

The Potrero de los Funes Circuit (Circuito de Potrero de los Funes) was an Argentine motorsports race track. It is located 14 km (8.7 mi) from San Luis, capital city of the San Luis Province, Argentina.

== History ==
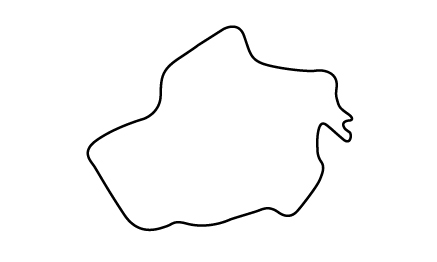
Original circuit layout used between 1978 and 1987

The circuit was originally constructed in 1978 as a semi-permanent venue, with a length of 6.206 km (3.856 mi). It was created by modifying the ring road that encircles Lake Potrero de los Funes at the course's center, and featured substantial elevation changes along with a variety of different types of corners. After hosting a round of Turismo Carretera on 15 August 1987, but two separate crashes which resulted in the deaths of two spectators and an injured driver led to the track being abandoned.

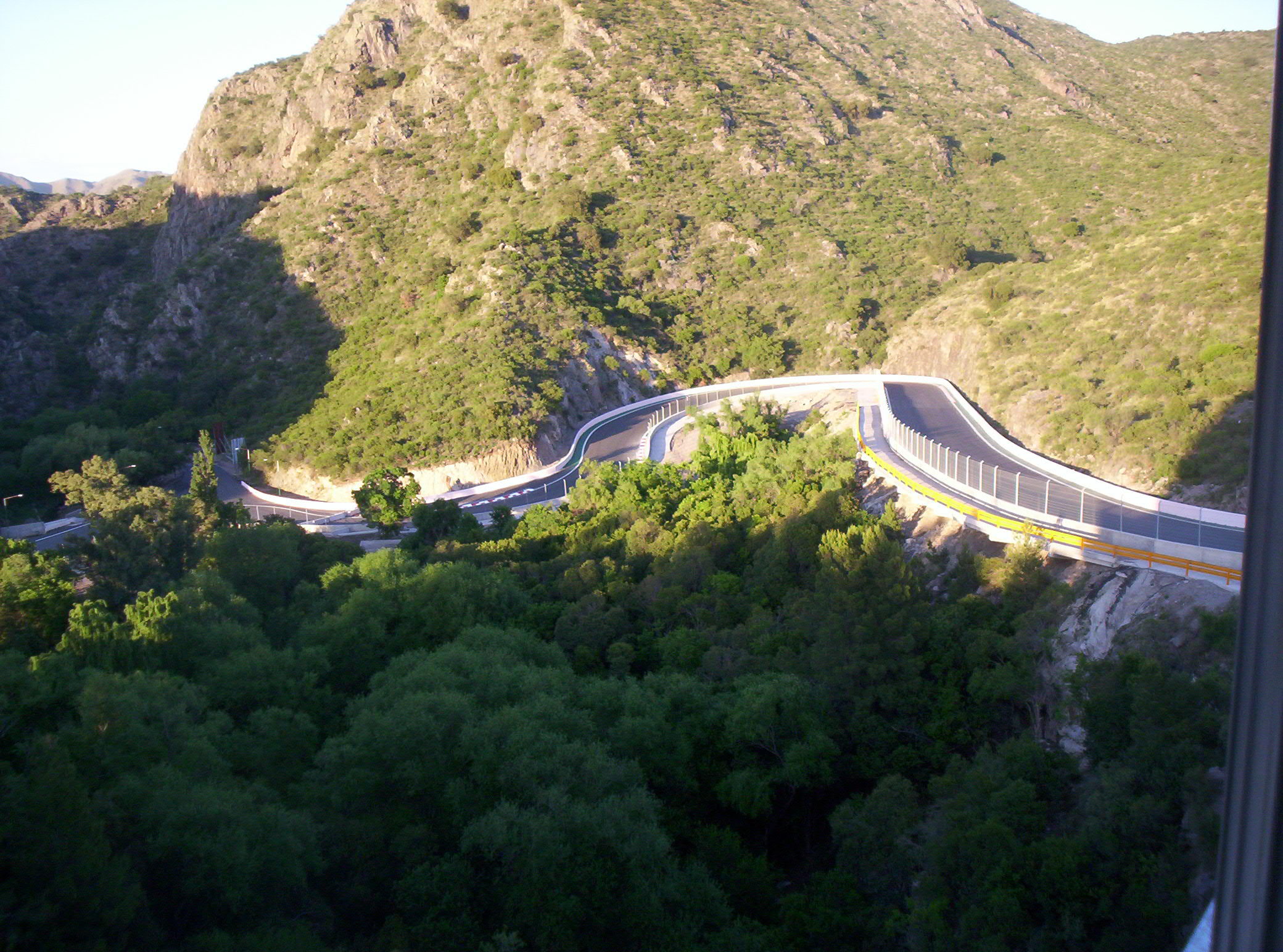
Turns 16, 17 and 18 at Potrero de los Funes.

The track was re-opened in 2008 as a venue for the FIA GT Championship. The circuit was modified, with two chicanes added due to a lack of run-off area as well as the tightening of the final corner to create a safer pit entry – extending the circuits' length to 6.270 km (3.896 mi). Belgians Bert Longin and Anthony Kumpen won the first San Luis 2 Hours in their Saleen S7R. The circuit went on to host two rounds of the FIA GT1 World Championship in 2010 and 2011, along with local series such as TC2000 and Turismo Nacional.

The final round held at the circuit was in 2018 for TC2000. Following years of disuse, the circuit was dismantled in February 2024.

== Major events ==
Year	Race	Category	Winner	Results
2008	TC 2000 at Potrero de los Funes	TC2000	(Argentina) José María López	Results
2008	San Luis 2 Hours	FIA GT Championship	(Belgium) Bert Longin (Belgium) Anthony Kumpen	Results
2009	Gran Premio Provincia de San Luis	Turismo Carretera	(Argentina) Juan Bautista de Benedictis	Results
2009	Gran Premio Coronación	TC2000	(Argentina) Gabriel Ponce de León (Brazil) Daniel Serra	Results
2010	Gran Premio Coronación	TC2000	(Argentina) Matias Rossi	Results
2010	San Luis 1 Hour	FIA GT1 World Championship	(France) Frédéric Makowiecki (France) Yann Clairay	Results
2011	San Luis 1 Hour	FIA GT1 World Championship	(Netherlands) Francesco Pastorelli (Netherlands) Yelmer Buurman	Results
2011	Gran Premio Province of San Luis	TC2000	(Argentina) Fabián Yannantuoni	Results

== Lap records ==
The fastest official race lap records at the Potrero de los Funes Circuit are listed as:

Category	Time	Driver	Vehicle	Event
Full Circuit (2008–2024): 6.270 km (3.896 mi)
GT1	2:14.173	Yelmer Buurman	Chevrolet Corvette C6.R	2011 San Luis FIA GT1 round
GT2	2:20.319	Matías Russo	Ferrari F430 GT2	2008 FIA GT San Luis 2 Hours
FIA GT Group 2	2:23.578	Renaud Kuppens	Gillet Vertigo Streiff	2008 FIA GT San Luis 2 Hours
Súper TC2000	2:28.198	Facundo Ardusso	Fiat Linea	2014 Potrero de los Funes Súper TC2000 round
Turismo Carretera	2:28.900	José María López	Torino Cherokee	2009 Potrero de los Funes Turismo Carretera round
Formula Renault 2.0	2:30.649	Julián Santero	Tito F4-A	2012 Potrero de los Funes Formula Renault Argentina round
Turismo Nacional Clase 3	2:41.419	Mariano Werner	Fiat Linea	2018 Potrero de los Funes Turismo Nacional round
Turismo Nacional Clase 2	2:47.273	Luciano Bucci	Ford Fiesta Kinetic	2018 Potrero de los Funes Turismo Nacional round
