= 2008 Potrero de los Funes TC2000 round =

The Potrero de los Funes Circuit

The 2008 TC2000 in San Luis was the 13th race of the 2008 TC2000 season. It took place at the Potrero de los Funes Circuit in Argentina on 23 November 2008.

== Results ==
Position	Number	Driver	Car
1	37	(Argentina) José María López	Honda Civic
2	5	(Argentina) Christian Ledesma	Chevrolet Astra
3	9	(Argentina) Juan Manuel Silva	Honda Civic
4	8	(Argentina) Leonel Pernía	Honda Civic
5	1	(Argentina) Matías Rossi	Renault Megane
6	13	(Argentina) Luis Jose Di Palma	Ford Focus
7	2	(Argentina) Guillermo Ortelli	Renault Megane
8	10	(Argentina) Carlos Okulovich	Honda Civic
9	3	(Argentina) Martín Basso	Ford Focus
10	6	(Argentina) Ricardo Risatti	Chevrolet Astra
11	12	(Argentina) Mariano Werner	Ford Focus
12	42	(Argentina) Alejandro González	Ford Focus
13	4	(Argentina) Gabriel Ponce de León	Ford Focus
14	18	(Argentina) Agustin Canapino	Chevrolet Astra
15	16	(Argentina) Fabricio Pezzini	Honda Civic
16	11	(Argentina) Norberto Fontana	Toyota Corolla
17	38	(Uruguay) Juan Ignacio Caceres	Honda Civic
18	33	(Argentina) Marcelo Bugliotti	Chevrolet Astra
19	24	(Argentina) Gustavo Der Ohanessian	Volkswagen Polo
20	41	(Argentina) Bernardo Llaver	Honda Civic
21	14	(Argentina) Leandro Carducci	Ford Focus
22	17	(Argentina) Fabian Yannantuoni	Chevrolet Astra
23	16	(Argentina) Daniel Belli	Honda Civic
24	39	(Argentina) Lucas Benamo	Honda Civic
25	32	(Argentina) Franco Coscia	Honda Civic
26	20	(Argentina) Damian Fineschi	Honda Civic
