= 2008 TC 2000 Championship =

Seasons
- ← 2007 2009 →

The 2008 TC 2000 Championship was the 30th Turismo Competicion 2000 season.

== Final standings ==
=== Top 10 ===
Position	Number	Driver	Car	Points
1	37	(Argentina) José María López	Honda Civic	174
2	2	(Argentina) Guillermo Ortelli	Renault Megane	155
3	9	(Argentina) Juan Manuel Silva	Honda Civic	153
4	5	(Argentina) Christian Ledesma	Chevrolet Astra	133
5	1	(Argentina) Matías Rossi	Renault Megane	123
6	3	(Argentina) Martín Basso	Ford Focus	108
7	4	(Argentina) Gabriel Ponce de León	Ford Focus	68
8	11	(Argentina) Norberto Fontana	Toyota Corolla	68
9	8	(Argentina) Leonel Pernía	Honda Civic	58
10	13	(Argentina) Luis José di Palma	Ford Focus	57

== Race calendar and winners ==
Date	Race	Track	Winner	Results
09/03	1	(Argentina) Paraná	(Argentina) Guillermo Ortelli	Results
13/04	2	(Argentina) Salta	(Argentina) Matías Rossi	Results
04/05	3	(Argentina) General Roca	(Argentina) Norberto Fontana	Results
18/05	4	(Argentina) Santa Fe	(Argentina) José María López	Results
08/06	5	(Argentina) San Juan	(Argentina) Gabriel Ponce de León	Results
29/06	6	(Argentina) Resistencia	(Argentina) Christian Ledesma	Results
20/07	7	(Argentina) Cordoba	(Argentina) Leonel Pernía	Results
10/08	8	(Argentina) Buenos Aires	(Argentina) José María López (United Kingdom) Anthony Reid	Results
31/08	9	(Argentina) Oberá	(Argentina) José María López	Results
21/09	10	(Argentina) Rio Hondo	(Argentina) Matías Rossi	Results
12/10	11	(Argentina) Viedma	(Argentina) Martín Basso	Results
02/11	12	(Argentina) Mendoza	(Argentina) Gabriel Ponce de León	Results
23/11	13	(Argentina) Potrero de los Funes	(Argentina) José María López	Results
07/12	14	(Uruguay) Punta del Este	(Argentina) Martín Basso	Results
