= Potrero de los Funes Dam =

Potrero de los Funes
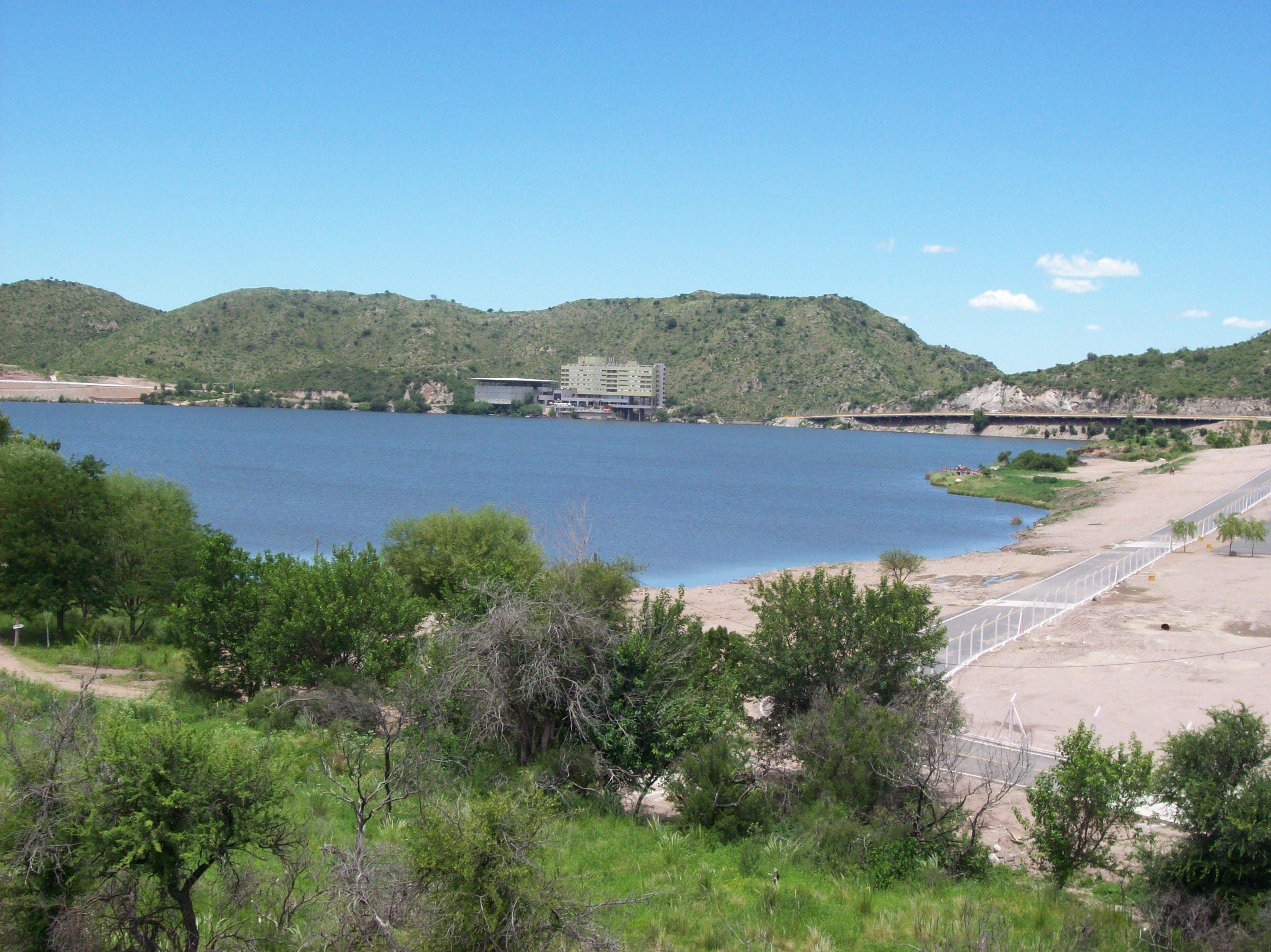

- Location within Argentina
- Location: Potrero de los Funes, La Capital Department, San Luis Province; Argentina
- Coordinates: 33°13′49″S 66°13′57″W
- Type: Reservoir
- Primary inflows: Los Molles and La Bolsa streams
- Primary outflows: Potrero River
- Surface area: 890 acres (360 ha)
- Average depth: 33 m (108 ft)
- Surface elevation: 3,970 ft (1,210 m)
- Settlements: Potrero de los Funes

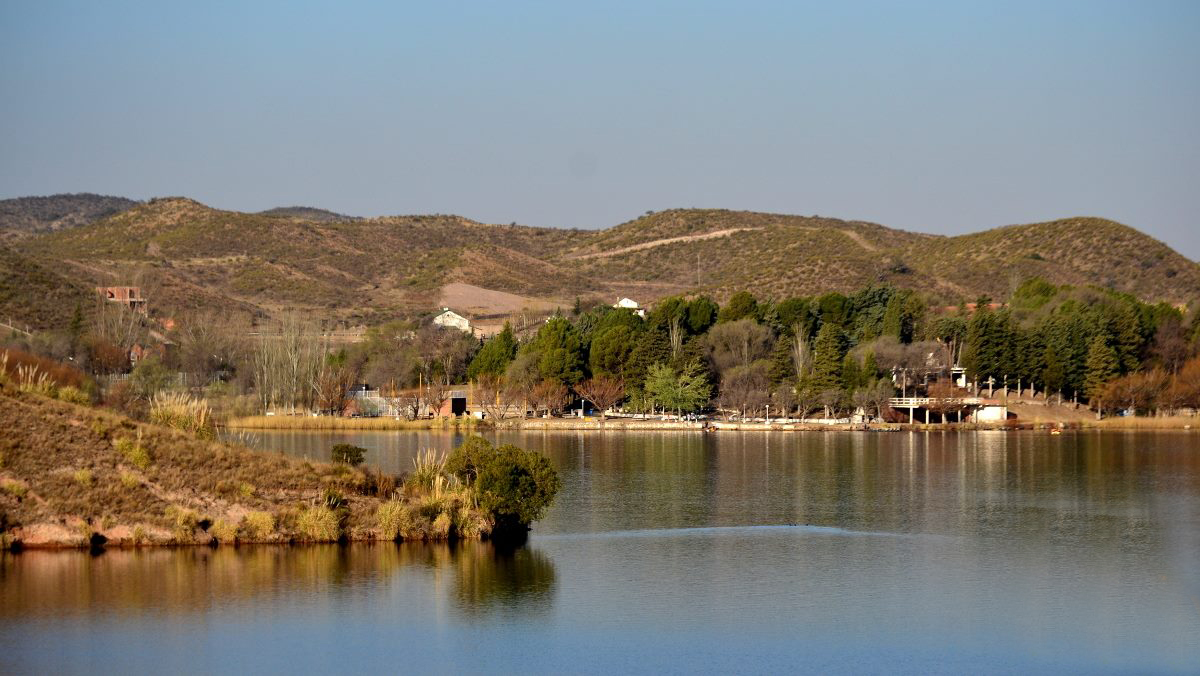
Potrero de los Funes reservoir

Lake Potrero de los Funes (Embalse Potrero de los Funes) is a reservoir 18 km (11 mi) northeast of San Luis, Argentina.

== Overview ==
The site, originally located in a corral belonging to the prominent Funes family of San Luis, was first dammed in 1860. The original levee, one of the first of its kind in South America, was destroyed by the torrential flooding common to riverbanks in the Dry Pampas region, and was rebuilt in 1876. The present reservoir, planned for the growing water supply needs of the nearby provincial capital, was inaugurated in 1927.

Map of a race track around the lake, Potrero de los Funes Circuit

Populated with carp and silverside species, the lake became popular recreational fishing and camping grounds in subsequent decades, and the homonymous town, located north of the lake, grew around the resulting tourism industry; the Hotel Potrero de los Funes, a four star, 97 room facility, is the most important of the area's numerous lodges. The surrounding Potrero de los Funes Circuit, a 6.25 km (3.9 mi) track, was inaugurated in 2008, and hosts local Formula Renault, TC2000 and FIA GT Championships, among others.
