= 2011 FIA GT1 World Championship =

Auto racing season

Seasons
- ← 2010 2012 →

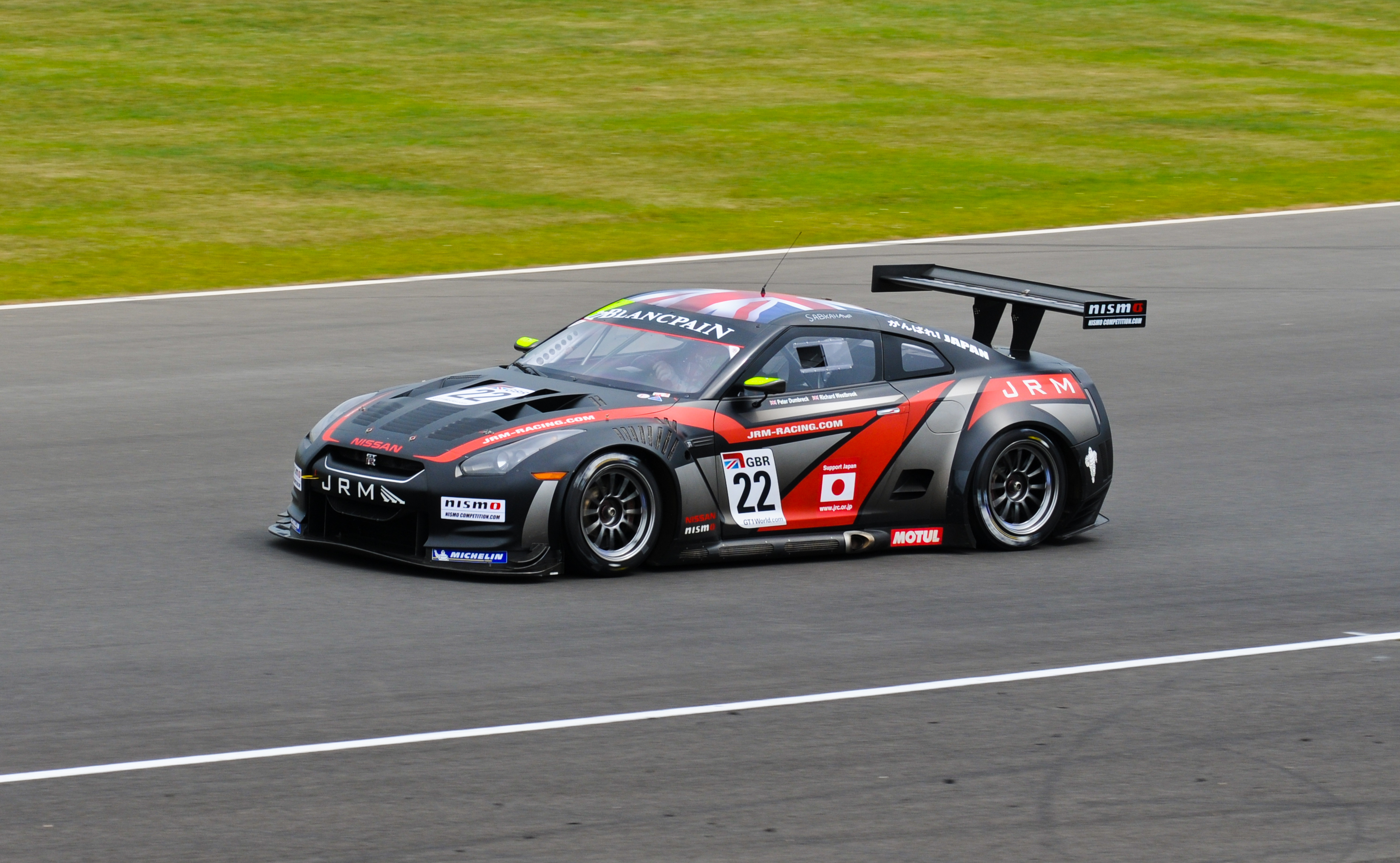
Michael Krumm and Lucas Luhr won the 2011 FIA GT1 World Championship in a JR Motorsports Nissan GT-R GT1.

The 2011 FIA GT1 World Championship season was the second season of the SRO Group's FIA GT1 World Championship, an auto racing series for grand tourer cars complying with Fédération Internationale de l'Automobile (FIA) GT1 regulations. The championship comprised two titles: GT1 World Champion for Drivers and GT1 World Champion for Teams. Five of the six manufacturers represented in the 2010 championship returned for the second season, however Maserati was not represented and 2010 Teams World Champions Vitaphone Racing Team did not defend their title.

The season commenced at the Yas Marina Circuit in Abu Dhabi on 25–26 March and ended at the Potrero de los Funes Circuit in Argentina on 4–6 November. The ten event season included an inaugural race at the Ordos International Circuit in China. Germans Lucas Luhr and Michael Krumm of the JR Motorsports team won the World Drivers' Championship after earning four race victories, while Hexis AMR won the Teams' Championship.

== Calendar ==
A ten-event calendar was announced at the FIA World Motor Sport Council meeting on 10 December 2010. The Ordos International Circuit of China gave the series a fourth event outside Europe, replacing the former Czech round at Brno. Several national events were moved to new circuits; Zolder replaced Spa-Francorchamps in Belgium and the Sachsenring replaced the Nürburgring in Germany.

The Autódromo Internacional de Curitiba was originally planned as a Brazilian round for the championship, but was cancelled mid-season. At the behest of the SRO Group, the FIA approved a replacement event at the Goldenport Park Circuit as a second Chinese round for the series, scheduled a week after the Ordos event. A day after the Goldenport round, the Beijing GT1 World Supercars exhibition event was held in the Olympic Green in Beijing and featured a short street race.

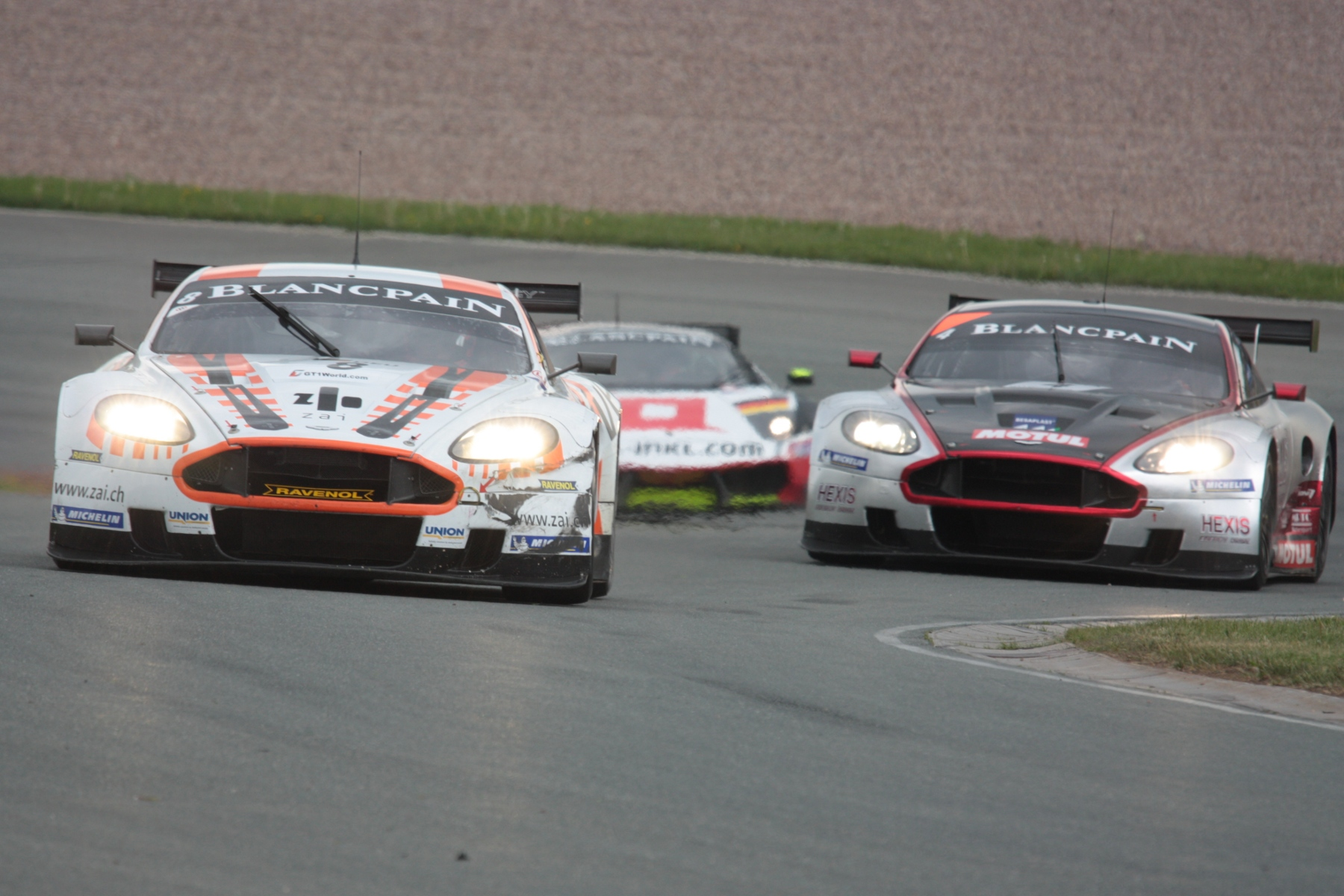
Aston Martin were represented in the championship by Young Driver AMR and Hexis AMR teams

Event	Circuit	Date
1	Yas Marina Circuit, Abu Dhabi, United Arab Emirates	26 March
2	Circuit Zolder, Belgium	10 April
3	Autódromo Internacional do Algarve, Portimão, Portugal	8 May
4	Sachsenring, Saxony, Germany	15 May
5	Silverstone Circuit, United Kingdom	5 June
6	Circuito de Navarra, Los Arcos, Spain	3 July
7	Circuit Paul Ricard, Le Castellet, France	17 July
8	Ordos International Circuit, Ordos City, China	4 September
9	Goldenport Park Circuit, Beijing, China	10 September
10	Potrero de los Funes Circuit, San Luis, Argentina	6 November

== Entries ==
=== Manufacturers ===
2011 was the final season in which the Maserati MC12 GT1, Corvette C6.R, and Aston Martin DBR9 were eligible for the championship. The three were running under a two-year waiver to meet homologation requirements. In June 2010, Aurora Racing Designs announced plans to develop a GT1 car based on the BMW Alpina B6, based on the existing B6 GT3 which races under FIA GT3 regulations. This project did not however come to fruition and no additional companies joined the six approved manufacturers. All of the Maserati teams decided to sit out for the last approved season, leaving the championship with five active manufacturers.

In February 2011 the SRO Group announced that 18 entries had been received for the 2011 season, but that the deadline for entries had been extended in order to allow possible negotiation for further teams. Aston Martin, Ford, Nissan, and Lamborghini were all confirmed as having two teams entered, while a fifth manufacturer was seeking the required second team necessary for entry. In March the FIA announced an entry of 20 cars, with Corvette joining the other four manufacturers.

=== Teams ===
Several of the twelve teams which competed in 2010 announced their intentions not to return for 2011. This included Matech Competition, who was moving to concentrate on development of the Ford GT for other racing series. Hegersport and Phoenix Racing also announced they would not be involved in FIA GT1 in 2011, while Reiter's Lamborghinis had been sold. Defending GT1 World Champions Vitaphone Racing Team had moved to the new Blancpain Endurance Series.

Returning teams for 2011 included Sumo Power GT, Münnich Motorsport, Marc VDS Racing Team, Hexis AMR, and Young Driver AMR. Swiss Racing Team also returned, but opted for Lamborghinis instead of their 2010 Nissans. JR Motorsports, a partner of Sumo Power, took over the second Nissan squad, while Marc VDS sister team Belgian Racing shared representation of Ford. The Mad-Croc Racing partnership of 2010 was divided for 2011, with DKR Engineering forming their own Corvette squad, while Selleslagh Racing Team raced under the guise of Exim Bank Team China. Both teams were ineligible for the Teams Championship as neither had secured a second car for the start of the season. No teams announced plans to campaign the Maserati MC12, ending seven straight seasons of competition in GT1.

During the season the Swiss Racing Team withdrew from three consecutive rounds following racing incidents at Sachsenring which damaged their two Lamborghinis, citing a lack of spare parts to repair their cars in time. Prior to the Ordos round, Swiss Racing Team's Lamborghinis were transferred to Münnich Motorsport. At the same time, DKR Engineering merged their outfit with Exim Bank Team China, giving Team China their first two-car entries of the season. Münnich then took over DKR's former entry under the new title of DKR www-discount.de allowing the series to maintain an 18-car field.

==== Entries ====
On 18 March 2011 the FIA published an entry list of teams and manufacturers for the full 2011 season. All teams used Michelin tyres.

Team	Car	Engine	No.	Drivers	Events
(France) Hexis AMR	Aston Martin DBR9	Aston Martin AM04 6.0 L V12	3	(Monaco) Clivio Piccione	All
(France) Hexis AMR	Aston Martin DBR9	Aston Martin AM04 6.0 L V12	3	(Netherlands) Stef Dusseldorp	All
(France) Hexis AMR	Aston Martin DBR9	Aston Martin AM04 6.0 L V12	4	(Germany) Christian Hohenadel	All
(France) Hexis AMR	Aston Martin DBR9	Aston Martin AM04 6.0 L V12	4	(Italy) Andrea Piccini	All
(Switzerland) Swiss Racing Team	Lamborghini Murciélago LP 670 R-SV	Lamborghini L537 6.5 L V12	5	(Austria) Karl Wendlinger	1–4
(Switzerland) Swiss Racing Team	Lamborghini Murciélago LP 670 R-SV	Lamborghini L537 6.5 L V12	5	(Netherlands) Peter Kox	1–4
(Switzerland) Swiss Racing Team	Lamborghini Murciélago LP 670 R-SV	Lamborghini L537 6.5 L V12	6	(Sweden) Max Nilsson	1–4
(Switzerland) Swiss Racing Team	Lamborghini Murciélago LP 670 R-SV	Lamborghini L537 6.5 L V12	6	(Czech Republic) Jiří Janák	1–4
(Germany) Young Driver AMR	Aston Martin DBR9	Aston Martin AM04 6.0 L V12	7	(Czech Republic) Tomáš Enge	All
(Germany) Young Driver AMR	Aston Martin DBR9	Aston Martin AM04 6.0 L V12	7	(Germany) Alex Müller	All
(Germany) Young Driver AMR	Aston Martin DBR9	Aston Martin AM04 6.0 L V12	8	(United Kingdom) Darren Turner	All
(Germany) Young Driver AMR	Aston Martin DBR9	Aston Martin AM04 6.0 L V12	8	(Germany) Stefan Mücke	All
(Belgium) Belgian Racing	Matech Ford GT1	Ford Cammer 5.3 L V8	9	(France) Antoine Leclerc	1
(Belgium) Belgian Racing	Matech Ford GT1	Ford Cammer 5.3 L V8	9	(France) Fabien Giroix	1
(Belgium) Belgian Racing	Matech Ford GT1	Ford Cammer 5.3 L V8	9	(Belgium) Vanina Ickx	2–7
(Belgium) Belgian Racing	Matech Ford GT1	Ford Cammer 5.3 L V8	9	(Switzerland) Mathias Beche	2
(Belgium) Belgian Racing	Matech Ford GT1	Ford Cammer 5.3 L V8	9	(Denmark) Christoffer Nygaard	3–10
(Belgium) Belgian Racing	Matech Ford GT1	Ford Cammer 5.3 L V8	9	(Switzerland) Jonathan Hirschi	8–10
(Belgium) Belgian Racing	Matech Ford GT1	Ford Cammer 5.3 L V8	10	(Czech Republic) Martin Matzke	1–3
(Belgium) Belgian Racing	Matech Ford GT1	Ford Cammer 5.3 L V8	10	(Serbia) Miloš Pavlović	1–2
(Belgium) Belgian Racing	Matech Ford GT1	Ford Cammer 5.3 L V8	10	(France) Antoine Leclerc	3–10
(Belgium) Belgian Racing	Matech Ford GT1	Ford Cammer 5.3 L V8	10	(France) Yann Clairay	4, 6–9
(Belgium) Belgian Racing	Matech Ford GT1	Ford Cammer 5.3 L V8	10	(Finland) Markus Palttala	5, 10
Exim Bank Team China	Corvette C6.R	Chevrolet LS7.R 7.0 L V8	11	(Netherlands) Mike Hezemans	1–7
Exim Bank Team China	Corvette C6.R	Chevrolet LS7.R 7.0 L V8	11	(Netherlands) Nick Catsburg	1–4
Exim Bank Team China	Corvette C6.R	Chevrolet LS7.R 7.0 L V8	11	(Austria) Andreas Zuber	5, 7
Exim Bank Team China	Corvette C6.R	Chevrolet LS7.R 7.0 L V8	11	(Belgium) Nico Verdonck	6
Exim Bank Team China	Corvette C6.R	Chevrolet LS7.R 7.0 L V8	11	(China) Ho-Pin Tung	8–9
Exim Bank Team China	Corvette C6.R	Chevrolet LS7.R 7.0 L V8	11	(Netherlands) Jeroen den Boer	8–9
Exim Bank Team China	Corvette C6.R	Chevrolet LS7.R 7.0 L V8	11	(Netherlands) Yelmer Buurman	10
Exim Bank Team China	Corvette C6.R	Chevrolet LS7.R 7.0 L V8	11	(Netherlands) Francesco Pastorelli	10
Exim Bank Team China	Corvette C6.R	Chevrolet LS7.R 7.0 L V8	12	(France) Michaël Rossi	8–10
Exim Bank Team China	Corvette C6.R	Chevrolet LS7.R 7.0 L V8	12	(Brazil) Sérgio Jimenez	8
Exim Bank Team China	Corvette C6.R	Chevrolet LS7.R 7.0 L V8	12	(Belgium) Nico Verdonck	9–10
(United Kingdom) Sumo Power GT	Nissan GT-R GT1	Nissan VK56DE 5.6 L V8	20	(Brazil) Enrique Bernoldi	All
(United Kingdom) Sumo Power GT	Nissan GT-R GT1	Nissan VK56DE 5.6 L V8	20	(Brazil) Ricardo Zonta	1–3
(United Kingdom) Sumo Power GT	Nissan GT-R GT1	Nissan VK56DE 5.6 L V8	20	(United Kingdom) Warren Hughes	4–5
(United Kingdom) Sumo Power GT	Nissan GT-R GT1	Nissan VK56DE 5.6 L V8	20	(Netherlands) Nick Catsburg	6–10
(United Kingdom) Sumo Power GT	Nissan GT-R GT1	Nissan VK56DE 5.6 L V8	21	(Australia) David Brabham	All
(United Kingdom) Sumo Power GT	Nissan GT-R GT1	Nissan VK56DE 5.6 L V8	21	(United Kingdom) Jamie Campbell-Walter	All
(United Kingdom) JR Motorsports	Nissan GT-R GT1	Nissan VK56DE 5.6 L V8	22	(United Kingdom) Peter Dumbreck	All
(United Kingdom) JR Motorsports	Nissan GT-R GT1	Nissan VK56DE 5.6 L V8	22	(United Kingdom) Richard Westbrook	All
(United Kingdom) JR Motorsports	Nissan GT-R GT1	Nissan VK56DE 5.6 L V8	23	(Germany) Michael Krumm	All
(United Kingdom) JR Motorsports	Nissan GT-R GT1	Nissan VK56DE 5.6 L V8	23	(Germany) Lucas Luhr	All
(Germany) All-Inkl.com Münnich Motorsport	Lamborghini Murciélago LP 670 R-SV	Lamborghini L537 6.5 L V12	37	(Germany) Dominik Schwager	All
(Germany) All-Inkl.com Münnich Motorsport	Lamborghini Murciélago LP 670 R-SV	Lamborghini L537 6.5 L V12	37	(Netherlands) Nicky Pastorelli	All
(Germany) All-Inkl.com Münnich Motorsport	Lamborghini Murciélago LP 670 R-SV	Lamborghini L537 6.5 L V12	38	(Germany) Marc Basseng	All
(Germany) All-Inkl.com Münnich Motorsport	Lamborghini Murciélago LP 670 R-SV	Lamborghini L537 6.5 L V12	38	(Germany) Markus Winkelhock	All
(Belgium) Marc VDS Racing Team	Matech Ford GT1	Ford Cammer 5.3 L V8	40	(Belgium) Bas Leinders	All
(Belgium) Marc VDS Racing Team	Matech Ford GT1	Ford Cammer 5.3 L V8	40	(Germany) Marc Hennerici	1–9
(Belgium) Marc VDS Racing Team	Matech Ford GT1	Ford Cammer 5.3 L V8	40	(Argentina) Ricardo Risatti	10
(Belgium) Marc VDS Racing Team	Matech Ford GT1	Ford Cammer 5.3 L V8	41	(Belgium) Maxime Martin	All
(Belgium) Marc VDS Racing Team	Matech Ford GT1	Ford Cammer 5.3 L V8	41	(France) Frédéric Makowiecki	1–2, 4–5, 7–8
(Belgium) Marc VDS Racing Team	Matech Ford GT1	Ford Cammer 5.3 L V8	41	(France) Yann Clairay	3, 10
(Belgium) Marc VDS Racing Team	Matech Ford GT1	Ford Cammer 5.3 L V8	41	(Belgium) Bertrand Baguette	6, 9
(Luxembourg) DKR Engineering (Luxembourg) DKR www-discount.de	Corvette C6.R	Chevrolet LS7.R 7.0 L V8	47		
(Luxembourg) DKR Engineering (Luxembourg) DKR www-discount.de	Corvette C6.R	Chevrolet LS7.R 7.0 L V8	47	(France) Michaël Rossi	1–3, 5–7
(Luxembourg) DKR Engineering (Luxembourg) DKR www-discount.de	Corvette C6.R	Chevrolet LS7.R 7.0 L V8	47	(Brazil) Jaime Camara	1–2
(Luxembourg) DKR Engineering (Luxembourg) DKR www-discount.de	Corvette C6.R	Chevrolet LS7.R 7.0 L V8	47	(Italy) Matteo Bobbi	3
(Luxembourg) DKR Engineering (Luxembourg) DKR www-discount.de	Corvette C6.R	Chevrolet LS7.R 7.0 L V8	47	(France) Dimitri Enjalbert	5–7
(Luxembourg) DKR Engineering (Luxembourg) DKR www-discount.de	Lamborghini Murciélago LP 670 R-SV	Lamborghini L537 6.5 L V12	47	(Switzerland) Benjamin Leuenberger	8–9
(Luxembourg) DKR Engineering (Luxembourg) DKR www-discount.de	Lamborghini Murciélago LP 670 R-SV	Lamborghini L537 6.5 L V12	47	(Germany) Manuel Lauck	8–10
(Luxembourg) DKR Engineering (Luxembourg) DKR www-discount.de	Lamborghini Murciélago LP 670 R-SV	Lamborghini L537 6.5 L V12	47	(Germany) Christopher Haase	10
(Luxembourg) DKR Engineering (Luxembourg) DKR www-discount.de	Lamborghini Murciélago LP 670 R-SV	Lamborghini L537 6.5 L V12	48	(United Kingdom) Jonathan Kennard	8–10
(Luxembourg) DKR Engineering (Luxembourg) DKR www-discount.de	Lamborghini Murciélago LP 670 R-SV	Lamborghini L537 6.5 L V12	48	(Germany) Christopher Brück	8–10

== Regulation changes ==
Following the 2010 season, three major changes were made to the GT1 regulations. Teams would now have six sets of tyres made available to them at each event, increased from the previous limit of four. Starting with the second event of the season, two of the tyres would be previously used sets from the previous event in the season, available throughout the weekend. Two fresh sets were given to the teams at the start of the first practice session, while the final two fresh sets were available prior to the warm-up session.

Two of the regulation changes involved the allocation of championship points in the qualifying race, with points now awarded to the top six finishers instead of only the top three. Further, the winner of the qualifying race would earn 10 kg (22 lb) of success ballast for the next event in the championship, while second place was given 5 kg (11 lb). The ninth-place finisher in the qualifying race would lose 5 kg of success ballast, while any car finishing tenth or lower had 10 kg removed. Finally, the success ballast for the winner of the championship race was lowered from 40 kg (88 lb) to 30 kg (66 lb).

== Results and standings ==
=== Race results ===
Event	Circuit	Qualifying race winner	Championship race winner	Report
1	Abu Dhabi	(Belgium) No. 41 Marc VDS Racing Team	(France) No. 3 Hexis AMR	Report
1	Abu Dhabi	(Belgium) Maxime Martin (France) Frédéric Makowiecki	(Monaco) Clivio Piccione (Netherlands) Stef Dusseldorp	Report
2	Zolder	(Germany) No. 38 All-Inkl.com Münnich Motorsport	(Germany) No. 38 All-Inkl.com Münnich Motorsport	Report
2	Zolder	(Germany) Marc Basseng (Germany) Markus Winkelhock	(Germany) Marc Basseng (Germany) Markus Winkelhock	Report
3	Algarve	(United Kingdom) No. 22 JR Motorsports	(United Kingdom) No. 23 JR Motorsports	Report
3	Algarve	(United Kingdom) Peter Dumbreck (United Kingdom) Richard Westbrook	(Germany) Lucas Luhr (Germany) Michael Krumm	Report
4	Sachsenring	(Belgium) No. 41 Marc VDS Racing Team	(France) No. 4 Hexis AMR	Report
4	Sachsenring	(Belgium) Maxime Martin (France) Frédéric Makowiecki	(Germany) Christian Hohenadel (Italy) Andrea Piccini	Report
5	Silverstone	(Germany) No. 7 Young Driver AMR	(United Kingdom) No. 23 JR Motorsports	Report
5	Silverstone	(Czech Republic) Tomáš Enge (Germany) Alex Müller	(Germany) Lucas Luhr (Germany) Michael Krumm	Report
6	Navarra	(Germany) No. 38 All-Inkl.com Münnich Motorsport	(Germany) No. 37 All-Inkl.com Münnich Motorsport	Report
6	Navarra	(Germany) Marc Basseng (Germany) Markus Winkelhock	(Netherlands) Nicky Pastorelli (Germany) Dominik Schwager	Report
7	Paul Ricard	(United Kingdom) No. 23 JR Motorsports	(United Kingdom) No. 23 JR Motorsports	Report
7	Paul Ricard	(Germany) Lucas Luhr (Germany) Michael Krumm	(Germany) Lucas Luhr (Germany) Michael Krumm	Report
8	Ordos	(Belgium) No. 41 Marc VDS Racing Team	(Belgium) No. 41 Marc VDS Racing Team	Report
8	Ordos	(Belgium) Maxime Martin (France) Frédéric Makowiecki	(Belgium) Maxime Martin (France) Frédéric Makowiecki	Report
9	Beijing	(Germany) No. 7 Young Driver AMR	(Germany) No. 8 Young Driver AMR	Report
9	Beijing	(Czech Republic) Tomáš Enge (Germany) Alex Müller	(United Kingdom) Darren Turner (Germany) Stefan Mücke	Report
10	San Luis	No. 11 Exim Bank Team China	No. 11 Exim Bank Team China	Report
10	San Luis	(Netherlands) Yelmer Buurman (Netherlands) Francesco Pastorelli	(Netherlands) Yelmer Buurman (Netherlands) Francesco Pastorelli	Report

=== Championships ===
Championship points were awarded for the first six positions in each qualifying race and for the first ten positions in each championship race. Entries were required to complete 75% of the winning car's race distance in order to be classified and earn points. Individual drivers were required to participate for a minimum of 25 minutes in order to earn championship points in any race.

Points system
Race type	Position									
Race type	1st	2nd	3rd	4th	5th	6th	7th	8th	9th	10th
Qualifying race	8	6	4	3	2	1	0	0	0	0
Championship race	25	18	15	12	10	8	6	4	2	1

==== Drivers' Championship ====
Pos	Driver	Team	ABU (United Arab Emirates)		ZOL (Belgium)		ALG (Portugal)		SAC (Germany)		SIL (United Kingdom)		NAV (Spain)		PRI (France)		ORD (China)		BEI (China)		SAN (Argentina)		Total
Pos	Driver	Team	QR	CR	QR	CR	QR	CR	QR	CR	QR	CR	QR	CR	QR	CR	QR	CR	QR	CR	QR	CR	Total
1	(Germany) Michael Krumm (Germany) Lucas Luhr	(United Kingdom) JR Motorsports	3	14	7	9	2	1	11	9	2	1	9	6	1	1	11	9	4	3	2	Ret	137
2	(United Kingdom) Darren Turner (Germany) Stefan Mücke	(Germany) Young Driver AMR	Ret	5	Ret	7	4	2	3	3	Ret	Ret	6	Ret	3	2	7	5	2	1	DNS	DNS	120
3	(Germany) Christian Hohenadel (Italy) Andrea Piccini	(France) Hexis AMR	9	4	10	2	11	8	5	1	10	Ret	5	5	6	5	8	4	3	10	14	5	111
4	(Czech Republic) Tomáš Enge (Germany) Alex Müller	(Germany) Young Driver AMR	Ret	6	3	3	Ret	Ret	10	Ret	1	2	Ret	13	2	3	16	14	1	2	5	10	103
5	(Germany) Marc Basseng (Germany) Markus Winkelhock	(Germany) All-Inkl.com Münnich Motorsport	6	3	1	1	7	6	9	Ret	Ret	5	1	2	7	8	EX	8	12	Ret	6	Ret	102
6	(Belgium) Maxime Martin	(Belgium) Marc VDS Racing Team	1	8	5	8	6	Ret	1	Ret	NC	Ret	3	4	5	6	1	1	Ret	4	15	11	98
7	(Monaco) Clivio Piccione (Netherlands) Stef Dusseldorp	(France) Hexis AMR	5	1	6	6	13	Ret	2	11	5	4	10	8	Ret	11	4	3	5	Ret	8	3	95
8	(Netherlands) Nicky Pastorelli (Germany) Dominik Schwager	(Germany) All-Inkl.com Münnich Motorsport	Ret	11	Ret	Ret	5	4	7	2	6	10	2	1	Ret	9	6	6	9	Ret	3	Ret	80
9	(United Kingdom) Peter Dumbreck (United Kingdom) Richard Westbrook	(United Kingdom) JR Motorsports	2	2	Ret	Ret	1	12	6	7	Ret	Ret	7	9	4	Ret	2	2	7	7	NC	8	78
10	(Australia) David Brabham (United Kingdom) Jamie Campbell-Walter	(United Kingdom) Sumo Power GT	8	9	11	Ret	3	3	8	5	Ret	Ret	4	3	9	4	3	7	11	8	7	Ret	75
11	(France) Frédéric Makowiecki	(Belgium) Marc VDS Racing Team	1	8	5	8			1	Ret	NC	Ret			5	6	1	1					69
12	(Brazil) Enrique Bernoldi	(United Kingdom) Sumo Power GT	4	Ret	12	Ret	8	7	4	4	4	7	Ret	12	10	7	5	Ret	10	6	4	4	64
13	(Netherlands) Nick Catsburg	Exim Bank Team China	7	10	2	5	9	9	Ret	6													58
13	(Netherlands) Nick Catsburg	(United Kingdom) Sumo Power GT											Ret	12	10	7	5	Ret	10	6	4	4	58
14	(Netherlands) Mike Hezemans	Exim Bank Team China	7	10	2	5	9	9	Ret	6	3	3	Ret	Ret	Ret	Ret							46
15	(Netherlands) Yelmer Buurman (Netherlands) Francesco Pastorelli	Exim Bank Team China																			1	1	33
16	(Austria) Karl Wendlinger (Netherlands) Peter Kox	(Switzerland) Swiss Racing Team	10	7	4	4	10	5	12	Ret													31
17	(Belgium) Bertrand Baguette	(Belgium) Marc VDS Racing Team											3	4					Ret	4			28
18	(United Kingdom) Warren Hughes	(United Kingdom) Sumo Power GT							4	4	4	7											24
19	(Germany) Manuel Lauck	(Luxembourg) DKR Engineering															12	15	13	9	9	2	20
20	(Austria) Andreas Zuber	Exim Bank Team China									3	3			Ret	Ret							19
21=	(Germany) Christopher Haase	(Luxembourg) DKR Engineering																			9	2	18
21=	(Belgium) Bas Leinders	(Belgium) Marc VDS Racing Team	11	DNS	Ret	10	Ret	10	Ret	8	11	6	12	10	Ret	12	10	10	Ret	Ret	Ret	9	18
22	(France) Michaël Rossi	(Luxembourg) DKR Engineering	Ret	13	9	Ret	15	Ret			9	Ret	8	7	8	10							17
22	(France) Michaël Rossi	Exim Bank Team China															15	16	8	5	11	Ret	17
23	(Germany) Marc Hennerici	(Belgium) Marc VDS Racing Team	11	DNS	Ret	10	Ret	10	Ret	8	11	6	12	10	Ret	12	10	10	Ret	Ret			16
24	(France) Antoine Leclerc	(Belgium) Belgian Racing	14	Ret			16	Ret	13	10	8	8	Ret	Ret	Ret	Ret	13	11	Ret	Ret	10	6	13
25	(Finland) Markus Palttala	(Belgium) Belgian Racing									8	8									10	6	12
26	(Belgium) Nico Verdonck	Exim Bank Team China											Ret	Ret					8	5	11	Ret	10
27=	(Brazil) Ricardo Zonta	(United Kingdom) Sumo Power GT	4	Ret	12	Ret	8	7															9
27=	(Denmark) Christoffer Nygaard	(Belgium) Belgian Racing					14	11	Ret	Ret	7	9	11	11	Ret	13	9	Ret	6	Ret	12	7	9
28=	(Switzerland) Jonathan Hirschi	(Belgium) Belgian Racing															9	Ret	6	Ret	12	7	7
28=	(France) Dimitri Enjalbert	(Luxembourg) DKR Engineering									9	Ret	8	7	8	10							7
29=	(France) Yann Clairay	(Belgium) Marc VDS Racing Team					6	Ret													15	11	2
29=	(France) Yann Clairay	(Belgium) Belgian Racing							13	10			Ret	Ret	Ret	Ret	13	11	Ret	Ret			2
29=	(Belgium) Vanina Ickx	(Belgium) Belgian Racing			Ret	Ret	14	11	Ret	Ret	7	9	11	11	Ret	13							2
29=	(Switzerland) Benjamin Leuenberger	(Luxembourg) DKR Engineering															12	15	13	9			2
29=	(Argentina) Ricardo Risatti	(Belgium) Marc VDS Racing Team																			Ret	9	2
NC	(Sweden) Max Nilsson (Czech Republic) Jiří Janák	(Switzerland) Swiss Racing Team	13	Ret	8	DNS	12	Ret	Ret	Ret													0
NC	(Brazil) Jaime Camara	(Luxembourg) DKR Engineering	Ret	13	9	Ret																	0
NC	(Czech Republic) Martin Matzke	(Belgium) Belgian Racing	12	12	Ret	11	16	Ret															0
NC	(Serbia) Miloš Pavlović	(Belgium) Belgian Racing	12	12	Ret	11																	0
NC	(China) Ho-Pin Tung (Netherlands) Jeroen den Boer	Exim Bank Team China															Ret	12	14	11			0
NC	(United Kingdom) Jonathan Kennard (Germany) Christopher Brück	(Luxembourg) DKR Engineering															14	13	Ret	Ret	13	Ret	0
NC	(France) Fabien Giroix	(Belgium) Belgian Racing	14	Ret																			0
NC	(Brazil) Sérgio Jimenez	Exim Bank Team China															15	16					0
NC	(Italy) Matteo Bobbi	(Luxembourg) DKR Engineering					15	Ret															0
NC	(Switzerland) Mathias Beche	(Belgium) Belgian Racing			Ret	Ret																	0

Key
Colour	Result
Gold	Race winner
Silver	2nd place
Bronze	3rd place
Green	Points finish
Blue	Non-points finish
Blue	Non-classified finish (NC)
Purple	Did not finish (Ret)
Black	Disqualified (DSQ)
Black	Excluded (EX)
White	Did not start (DNS)
White	Race cancelled (C)
White	Withdrew (WD)
Blank	Did not participate

==== Teams' Championship ====
Pos	Team	Manufacturer	Car	ABU (United Arab Emirates)		ZOL (Belgium)		ALG (Portugal)		SAC (Germany)		SIL (United Kingdom)		NAV (Spain)		PRI (France)		ORD (China)		BEI (China)		SAN (Argentina)		Total
Pos	Team	Manufacturer	Car	QR	CR	QR	CR	QR	CR	QR	CR	QR	CR	QR	CR	QR	CR	QR	CR	QR	CR	QR	CR	Total
1	(France) Hexis AMR	Aston Martin	3	5	1	6	6	13	Ret	2	11	5	4	10	8	Ret	11	4	3	5	Ret	8	3	235
1	(France) Hexis AMR	Aston Martin	4	9	4	10	2	11	8	5	1	10	Ret	5	5	6	5	8	4	3	10	14	5	235
2	(United Kingdom) JR Motorsports	Nissan	22	2	2	Ret	Ret	1	12	6	7	Ret	Ret	7	9	4	Ret	2	2	7	7	NC	8	232
2	(United Kingdom) JR Motorsports	Nissan	23	3	14	7	9	2	1	11	9	2	1	9	6	1	1	11	9	4	3	2	Ret	232
3	(Germany) Young Driver AMR	Aston Martin	7	Ret	6	3	3	Ret	Ret	10	Ret	1	2	Ret	13	2	3	16	14	1	2	5	10	231
3	(Germany) Young Driver AMR	Aston Martin	8	Ret	5	Ret	7	4	2	3	3	Ret	Ret	6	Ret	3	2	7	5	2	1	DNS	DNS	231
4	(Germany) All-Inkl.com Münnich Motorsport	Lamborghini	37	Ret	11	Ret	Ret	5	4	7	2	6	10	2	1	Ret	9	6	6	9	Ret	3	Ret	190
4	(Germany) All-Inkl.com Münnich Motorsport	Lamborghini	38	6	3	1	1	7	6	9	Ret	Ret	5	1	2	7	8	EX	8	12	Ret	6	Ret	190
5	(United Kingdom) Sumo Power GT	Nissan	20	4	Ret	12	Ret	8	7	4	4	4	7	Ret	12	10	7	5	Ret	10	6	4	4	154
5	(United Kingdom) Sumo Power GT	Nissan	21	8	9	11	Ret	3	3	8	5	Ret	Ret	4	3	9	4	3	7	11	8	7	Ret	154
6	(Belgium) Marc VDS Racing Team	Ford	40	11	DNS	Ret	10	Ret	10	Ret	8	11	6	12	10	Ret	12	10	10	Ret	Ret	Ret	9	132
6	(Belgium) Marc VDS Racing Team	Ford	41	1	8	5	8	6	Ret	1	Ret	NC	Ret	3	4	5	6	1	1	Ret	4	15	11	132
7	(Belgium) Belgian Racing	Ford	9	14	Ret	Ret	Ret	14	11	Ret	Ret	7	9	11	11	Ret	13	9	Ret	6	Ret	12	7	39
7	(Belgium) Belgian Racing	Ford	10	12	12	Ret	11	16	Ret	13	10	8	8	Ret	Ret	Ret	Ret	13	11	Ret	Ret	10	6	39
8	(Switzerland) Swiss Racing Team	Lamborghini	5	10	7	4	4	10	5	12	Ret													32
8	(Switzerland) Swiss Racing Team	Lamborghini	6	13	Ret	8	DNS	12	Ret	Ret	Ret													32

Key
Colour	Result
Gold	Race winner
Silver	2nd place
Bronze	3rd place
Green	Points finish
Blue	Non-points finish
Blue	Non-classified finish (NC)
Purple	Did not finish (Ret)
Black	Disqualified (DSQ)
Black	Excluded (EX)
White	Did not start (DNS)
White	Race cancelled (C)
White	Withdrew (WD)
Blank	Did not participate

The Exim Bank Team China and DKR Engineering teams were deemed ineligible for the Teams' Championship after failing to provide two cars each for the full season as required by series regulations.
