= 2003 Formula Renault V6 Eurocup =

Motor racing season

Seasons
- ← none 2004 →

The 2003 Formula Renault V6 Eurocup season began on April, 5 at Circuit de Catalunya. 2003 was the first season of this championship created by Renault as a support series in Eurosport's Super Racing Weekends (ETCC and FIA GT Championship). The titles went to Argentinian driver José María López and French team ARTA-Signature.

== Entry list ==
| Team | No. | Driver | Rounds |
|---|---|---|---|
| (Switzerland) Jenzer Motorsport | 1 | (Switzerland) Neel Jani | All |
| (Switzerland) Jenzer Motorsport | 2 | (Switzerland) Fredy Lienhard, Jr. | All |
| (France) ARTA-Signature | 3 | (France) Tristan Gommendy | All |
| (France) ARTA-Signature | 4 | (Japan) Kousuke Matsuura | All |
| (Italy) RN Motorsport | 5 | (Japan) Hayanari Shimoda | All |
| (Italy) RD Motorsport | 7 | (Germany) Ralf Dekarski | 1-7 |
| (Italy) RD Motorsport | 8 | (New Zealand) Matt Halliday | 1-7 |
| (Italy) Bicar Racing | 9 | (Italy) Ivan Bellarosa | All |
| (France) DAMS | 11 | (Australia) Christian Murchison | 1-7 |
| (France) DAMS | 11 | (Belgium) Mike den Tandt | 8-10 |
| (France) DAMS | 27 | (Pakistan) Adam Khan | 1-6 |
| (France) DAMS | 27 | (Italy) Davide di Benedetto | 10 |
| (France) DAMS | 37 | (Argentina) José María López | All |
| (Sweden) SRTS | 12 | (Sweden) Thed Björk | 1-2 |
| (Sweden) SRTS | 12 | (United Kingdom) Charles Hall | 3, 7 |
| (Sweden) SRTS | 12 | (Estonia) Marko Asmer | 4 |
| (Sweden) SRTS | 12 | (Belgium) Vanina Ickx | 9 |
| (Sweden) SRTS | 12 | (United Kingdom) Ryan Sharp | 10 |
| (Sweden) SRTS | 14 | (Sweden) Edward Sandström | All |
| (Italy) AFC Motorsport | 15 | (Italy) Andrea Belicchi | All |
| (Italy) AFC Motorsport | 16 | (Italy) Andrea Scafuro | All |
| (Italy) Victory Engineering (Italy) Cram Competition | 18 | (France) Damien Pasini | 2-10 |
| (Italy) Victory Engineering (Italy) Cram Competition | 19 | (Brazil) Jaime Melo, Jr. | All |
| (Italy) Guidare Formula | 23 | (Italy) Davide di Benedetto | 1-5, 8-9 |
| (Italy) Guidare Formula | 23 | (Italy) Matteo Cressoni | 10 |
| (Italy) EuroInternational | 50 | (Turkey) Can Artam | 5-6 |
| (Italy) EuroInternational | 77 | (Switzerland) Giorgio Mondini | All |

== Race calendar and results ==
- 31 March and 2 April were test days for all drivers and teams at the circuits of Circuito de Albacete and Circuit de Catalunya in Spain.

| Round | | Location | Circuit | Date | Pole position | Fastest lap | Winning driver | Winning team |
|---|---|---|---|---|---|---|---|---|
| 1 | R1 | Montmeló, Spain | Circuit de Catalunya | 5 April | (Argentina) José María López | (Switzerland) Neel Jani | (Switzerland) Neel Jani | (Switzerland) Jenzer Motorsport |
| 1 | R2 | Montmeló, Spain | Circuit de Catalunya | 6 April | (Argentina) José María López | (Argentina) José María López | (Switzerland) Neel Jani | (Switzerland) Jenzer Motorsport |
| 2 | R1 | Magny-Cours, France | Circuit de Nevers Magny-Cours | 26 April | (France) Tristan Gommendy | (Brazil) Jaime Melo, Jr. | (Brazil) Jaime Melo, Jr. | (Italy) Cram Competition |
| 2 | R2 | Magny-Cours, France | Circuit de Nevers Magny-Cours | 27 April | (France) Tristan Gommendy | (Brazil) Jaime Melo, Jr. | (Brazil) Jaime Melo, Jr. | (Italy) Cram Competition |
| 3 | R | Monte Carlo, Monaco | Circuit de Monaco | 31 May | (New Zealand) Matt Halliday | (Brazil) Jaime Melo, Jr. | (Brazil) Jaime Melo, Jr. | (Italy) Cram Competition |
| 4 | R1 | Leicestershire, United Kingdom | Donington Park | 28 June | (Argentina) José María López | (Argentina) José María López | (Argentina) José María López | (France) DAMS |
| 4 | R2 | Leicestershire, United Kingdom | Donington Park | 29 June | (Japan) Kosuke Matsuura | (Japan) Kosuke Matsuura | (Japan) Kosuke Matsuura | (France) ARTA-Signature |
| 5 | R | Spa, Belgium | Circuit de Spa-Francorchamps | 26 July | (Brazil) Jaime Melo, Jr. | (Argentina) José María López | (Brazil) Jaime Melo, Jr. | (Italy) Cram Competition |
| 6 | R1 | Spa, Belgium | Circuit de Spa-Francorchamps | 30 August | (Switzerland) Neel Jani | (France) Tristan Gommendy | (Italy) Andrea Belicchi | (Italy) AFC Motorsport |
| 6 | R2 | Spa, Belgium | Circuit de Spa-Francorchamps | 31 August | (France) Tristan Gommendy | (France) Tristan Gommendy | (Argentina) José María López | (France) DAMS |
| 7 | R1 | Anderstorp, Sweden | Scandinavian Raceway | 6 September | (Argentina) José María López | (Argentina) José María López | (Argentina) José María López | (France) DAMS |
| 7 | R2 | Anderstorp, Sweden | Scandinavian Raceway | 7 September | (Argentina) José María López | (France) Tristan Gommendy | (France) Tristan Gommendy | (France) ARTA-Signature |
| 8 | R1 | Oschersleben, Germany | Motorsport Arena Oschersleben | 20 September | (Argentina) José María López | (Argentina) José María López | (Japan) Kosuke Matsuura | (France) ARTA-Signature |
| 8 | R2 | Oschersleben, Germany | Motorsport Arena Oschersleben | 21 September | (Argentina) José María López | (Argentina) José María López | (Argentina) José María López | (France) DAMS |
| 9 | R1 | Estoril, Portugal | Autódromo do Estoril | 4 October | (Argentina) José María López | (Argentina) José María López | (Argentina) José María López | (France) DAMS |
| 9 | R2 | Estoril, Portugal | Autódromo do Estoril | 5 October | (Japan) Kosuke Matsuura | (Switzerland) Neel Jani | (Japan) Kosuke Matsuura | (France) ARTA-Signature |
| 10 | R1 | Monza, Italy | Autodromo Nazionale Monza | 18 October | (Switzerland) Neel Jani | (Argentina) José María López | (Switzerland) Neel Jani | (Switzerland) Jenzer Motorsport |
| 10 | R2 | Monza, Italy | Autodromo Nazionale Monza | 19 October | (Switzerland) Neel Jani | (Switzerland) Neel Jani | (Switzerland) Neel Jani | (Switzerland) Jenzer Motorsport |

== Championship standings ==
Points are awarded in both race as following : 30, 24, 20, 14, 10, 8, 6, 4, 2. 2 bonus points were awarded for pole position and for the fastest lap. The French round's main race had to be stopped early, and subsequently half points were awarded.

=== Drivers ===
| Pos | Driver | SPA (Spain) | | FRA (France) | | MON (Monaco) | UK (United Kingdom) | | BEL1 (Belgium) | BEL2 (Belgium) | | SWE (Sweden) | | GER (Germany) | | POR (Portugal) | | ITA (Italy) | | Points |
| Pos | Driver | gra | spr | gra | spr | gra | gra | spr | gra | gra | spr | gra | spr | gra | spr | gra | spr | gra | spr | Points |
|---|---|---|---|---|---|---|---|---|---|---|---|---|---|---|---|---|---|---|---|---|
| 1 | (Argentina) José María López | Ret | 13 | Ret | 3 | 3 | 1 | 3 | 7 | 2 | 1 | 1 | 2 | 2 | 1 | 1 | 5 | 3 | Ret | 354 |
| 2 | (Switzerland) Neel Jani | 1 | 1 | 2 | 6 | Ret | 3 | 4 | 2 | 3 | 3 | 2 | 3 | 10 | 6 | 4 | 2 | 1 | 1 | 350 |
| 3 | (Japan) Kosuke Matsuura | 2 | Ret | 3 | Ret | 14 | 4 | 1 | DSQ | 7 | 5 | 5 | 4 | 1 | 2 | 3 | 1 | 2 | 2 | 286 |
| 4 | (France) Tristan Gommendy | 6 | 4 | 17† | 2 | 13 | 2 | 2 | DSQ | 4 | 2 | 4 | 1 | Ret | 3 | 2 | 3 | 6 | 3 | 286 |
| 5 | (Brazil) Jaime Melo, Jr. | 8 | 2 | 1 | 1 | 1 | Ret | 5 | 1 | 11 | 6 | 9 | 6 | Ret | 8 | 8 | 4 | 3 | 4 | 226 |
| 6 | (Italy) Andrea Belicchi | 3 | 7 | 5 | Ret | 9 | 5 | 8 | 3 | 1 | DNS | 3 | 5 | 4 | 11 | 6 | 7 | Ret | 7 | 180 |
| 7 | (Switzerland) Giorgio Mondini | 10 | 5 | 8 | Ret | Ret | 7 | 7 | 5 | 9 | 7 | Ret | 7 | 11 | 7 | 10 | 8 | 4 | 5 | 109 |
| 8 | (New Zealand) Matt Halliday | 4 | 3 | 4 | Ret | 2 | 6 | 6 | Ret | 5 | 13 | DNS | DNS | | | | | | | 102 |
| 9 | (Italy) Davide di Benedetto | 5 | Ret | 13 | 4 | 10 | 12 | 14 | 12 | | | | | 5 | 5 | 11 | 11 | 7 | 6 | 72 |
| 10 | (Australia) Christian Murchison | 9 | 10 | 6 | DNS | 7 | 9 | 9 | 6 | 6 | 4 | 7 | Ret | | | | | | | 69 |
| 11 | (Belgium) Mike den Tandt | | | | | | | | | | | | | 3 | 4 | 5 | 6 | 12 | 9 | 62 |
| 12 | (Japan) Hayanari Shimoda | Ret | 8 | 15 | 7 | 5 | 13 | 11 | 10 | Ret | 9 | 8 | Ret | 8 | 9 | 7 | 9 | Ret | 10 | 62 |
| 13 | (France) Damien Pasini | | | 10 | Ret | 4 | Ret | 13 | 4 | 14 | 12 | 11 | 13 | 6 | Ret | 9 | Ret | 5 | 13 | 59 |
| 14 | (Italy) Andrea Scafuro | 11 | 9 | 11 | 5 | Ret | 11 | 10 | 8 | 10 | 10 | 12 | 10 | Ret | 10 | Ret | 10 | 11 | 8 | 40 |
| 15 | (Italy) Ivan Bellarosa | 12 | Ret | 18† | 9 | 6 | Ret | 18 | 11 | 15 | 8 | Ret | 11 | 7 | Ret | Ret | Ret | 8 | 12 | 34 |
| 16 | (Sweden) Thed Björk | 7 | 6 | 9 | 8 | | | | | | | | | | | | | | | 26 |
| 17 | (Sweden) Edward Sandström | 13 | 10 | 7 | Ret | 8 | 10 | 12 | Ret | | | 13 | 8 | Ret | 12 | 12 | 12 | 10 | 11 | 22 |
| 18 | (United Kingdom) Charles Hall | | | | | Ret | | | | | | 6 | 9 | | | | | | | 14 |
| 19 | (Turkey) Can Artam | | | | | | | | 15 | 8 | 11 | | | | | | | | | 6 |
| 20 | (Estonia) Marko Asmer | | | | | | 8 | 15 | | | | | | | | | | | | 6 |
| 21 | (Switzerland) Fredy Lienhard Jr. | Ret | Ret | 12 | Ret | Ret | Ret | 17 | 13 | Ret | 14 | 10 | 12 | 9 | 13 | Ret | Ret | 13 | Ret | 6 |
| 22 | (Pakistan) Adam Khan | 14 | Ret | 14 | 11 | 11 | Ret | 16 | 9 | 12 | Ret | | | | | | | | | 4 |
| 23 | (United Kingdom) Ryan Sharp | | | | | | | | | | | | | | | | | 9 | 14 | 4 |
| 24 | (Germany) Ralf Dekarski | 15 | 12 | 16 | 10 | 12 | 14 | 19 | 14 | 13 | 15 | DNS | DNS | | | | | | | 2 |
| 25 | (Belgium) Vanina Ickx | | | | | | | | | | | | | | | 13 | 13 | | | 0 |
| 26 | (Italy) Matteo Cressoni | | | | | | | | | | | | | | | | | Ret | DNS | 0 |
| Pos | Driver | SPA (Spain) | | FRA (France) | | MON (Monaco) | UK (United Kingdom) | | BEL1 (Belgium) | BEL2 (Belgium) | | SWE (Sweden) | | GER (Germany) | | POR (Portugal) | | ITA (Italy) | | Points |
| Pos | Driver | gra | spr | gra | spr | gra | gra | spr | gra | gra | spr | gra | spr | gra | spr | gra | spr | gra | spr | Points |

| Colour | Result |
|---|---|
| Gold | Winner |
| Silver | Second place |
| Bronze | Third place |
| Green | Points classification |
| Blue | Non-points classification |
| Blue | Non-classified finish (NC) |
| Purple | Retired, not classified (Ret) |
| Red | Did not qualify (DNQ) |
| Red | Did not pre-qualify (DNPQ) |
| Black | Disqualified (DSQ) |
| White | Did not start (DNS) |
| White | Withdrew (WD) |
| White | Race cancelled (C) |
| Blank | Did not practice (DNP) |
| Blank | Did not arrive (DNA) |
| Blank | Excluded (EX) |

- † Driver did not finish but was classified, having completed more than 90% of race distance.

=== Teams ===
| Pos | Team | Drivers | SPA (Spain) | | FRA (France) | | MON (Monaco) | UK (United Kingdom) | | BEL1 (Belgium) | BEL2 (Belgium) | | SWE (Sweden) | | GER (Germany) | | POR (Portugal) | | ITA (Italy) | | Points |
| Pos | Team | Drivers | gra | spr | gra | spr | gra | gra | spr | gra | gra | spr | gra | spr | gra | spr | gra | spr | gra | spr | Points |
|---|---|---|---|---|---|---|---|---|---|---|---|---|---|---|---|---|---|---|---|---|---|
| 1 | (France) ARTA-Signature | Kosuke Matsuura | 2 | Ret | 3 | Ret | 14 | 4 | 1* | DSQ | 7 | 5 | 5 | 4 | 1 | 2 | 3 | 1 | 2 | 2 | 572 |
| 1 | (France) ARTA-Signature | Tristan Gommendy | 6 | 4 | 17† | 2 | 13 | 2 | 2 | DSQ | 4* | 2* | 4 | 1* | Ret | 3 | 2 | 3 | 6 | 4 | 572 |
| 2 | (France) DAMS | José María López | Ret | 13* | Ret | 3 | 3 | 1* | 3 | 7* | 2 | 1 | 1* | 2 | 2* | 1* | 1* | 5 | 3* | Ret | 505 |
| 2 | (France) DAMS | Davide di Benedetto | | | | | | | | | | | | | | | | | 7 | 6 | 505 |
| 2 | (France) DAMS | Christian Murchison | 9 | 10 | 6 | DNS | 7 | 9 | 9 | 6 | 6 | 4 | 7 | Ret | | | | | | | 505 |
| 2 | (France) DAMS | Mike den Tandt | | | | | | | | | | | | | 3 | 4 | 5 | 6 | 12 | 9 | 505 |
| 2 | (France) DAMS | Adam Khan | 14 | Ret | 14 | 11 | 11 | Ret | 16 | 9 | 12 | Ret | | | | | | | | | 505 |
| 3 | (Switzerland) Jenzer Motorsport | Neel Jani | 1* | 1 | 2 | 6 | Ret | 3 | 4 | 2 | 3 | 3 | 2 | 3 | 10 | 6 | 4 | 2* | 1 | 1* | 356 |
| 3 | (Switzerland) Jenzer Motorsport | Fredy Lienhard, Jr. | Ret | Ret | 12 | Ret | Ret | Ret | 17 | 13 | Ret | 14 | 10 | 12 | 9 | 13 | Ret | Ret | 13 | Ret | 356 |
| 4 | (Italy) Cram Competition | Jaime Melo, Jr. | 8 | 2 | 1* | 1* | 1* | Ret | 5 | 1 | 11 | 6 | 9 | 6 | Ret | 8 | 8 | 4 | 3 | Ret | 226 |
| 5 | (Italy) AFC Motorsport | Andrea Belicchi | 3 | 7 | 5 | Ret | 9 | 5 | 8 | 3 | 1 | DNS | 3 | 5 | 4 | 11 | 6 | 7 | Ret | 7 | 220 |
| 5 | (Italy) AFC Motorsport | Andrea Scafuro | 11 | 9 | 11 | 5 | Ret | 11 | 10 | 8 | 10 | 10 | 12 | 10 | Ret | 10 | Ret | 10 | 11 | 8 | 220 |
| 6 | (Italy) EuroInternational | Giorgio Mondini | 10 | 5 | 8 | Ret | Ret | 7 | 7 | 5 | 9 | 7 | Ret | 7 | 11 | 7 | 10 | 8 | 4 | 5 | 115 |
| 6 | (Italy) EuroInternational | Can Artam | | | | | | | | 15 | 8 | 11 | | | | | | | | | 115 |
| 7 | (Italy) RD Motorsport | Matt Halliday | 4 | 3 | 4 | Ret | 2 | 6 | 6 | Ret | 5 | 13 | DNS | DNS | | | | | | | 104 |
| 7 | (Italy) RD Motorsport | Ralf Dekarski | 15 | 12 | 16 | 10 | 12 | 14 | 19 | 14 | 13 | 15 | DNS | DNS | | | | | | | 104 |
| 8 | (Sweden) SRTS | Thed Björk | 7 | 6 | 9 | 8 | | | | | | | | | | | | | | | 72 |
| 8 | (Sweden) SRTS | Edward Sandström | 13 | 10 | 7 | Ret | 8 | 10 | 12 | Ret | | | 13 | 8 | Ret | 12 | 12 | 12 | 10 | 11 | 72 |
| 8 | (Sweden) SRTS | Charles Hall | | | | | Ret | | | | | | 6 | 9 | | | | | | | 72 |
| 8 | (Sweden) SRTS | Marko Asmer | | | | | | 8 | 15 | | | | | | | | | | | | 72 |
| 8 | (Sweden) SRTS | Ryan Sharp | | | | | | | | | | | | | | | | | 9 | 14 | 72 |
| 8 | (Sweden) SRTS | Vanina Ickx | | | | | | | | | | | | | | | 13 | 13 | | | 72 |
| 9 | (Italy) RN Motorsport | Hayanari Shimoda | Ret | 8 | 15 | 7 | 5 | 13 | 11 | 10 | Ret | 9 | 8 | Ret | 8 | 9 | 7 | 9 | Ret | 10 | 62 |
| 10 | (Italy) Victory Engineering/Cram Comp. | Damien Pasini | | | 10 | Ret | 4 | Ret | 13 | 4 | 14 | 12 | 11 | 13 | 6 | Ret | 9 | Ret | 5 | 13 | 59 |
| 11 | (Italy) Guidare Formula | Davide di Benedetto | 5 | Ret | 13 | 4 | 10 | 12 | 14 | 12 | | | | | 5 | 5 | 11 | 11 | | | 54 |
| 11 | (Italy) Guidare Formula | Matteo Cressoni | | | | | | | | | | | | | | | | | Ret | DNS | 54 |
| 12 | (Italy) Bicar Racing | Ivan Bellarosa | 12 | Ret | 18† | 9 | 6 | Ret | 18 | 11 | 15 | 8 | Ret | 11 | 7 | Ret | Ret | Ret | 8 | 12 | 34 |
| Pos | Team | Drivers | SPA (Spain) | | FRA (France) | | MON (Monaco) | UK (United Kingdom) | | BEL1 (Belgium) | BEL2 (Belgium) | | SWE (Sweden) | | GER (Germany) | | POR (Portugal) | | ITA (Italy) | | Points |
| Pos | Team | Drivers | gra | spr | gra | spr | gra | gra | spr | gra | gra | spr | gra | spr | gra | spr | gra | spr | gra | spr | Points |

| Colour | Result |
|---|---|
| Gold | Winner |
| Silver | Second place |
| Bronze | Third place |
| Green | Points classification |
| Blue | Non-points classification |
| Blue | Non-classified finish (NC) |
| Purple | Retired, not classified (Ret) |
| Red | Did not qualify (DNQ) |
| Red | Did not pre-qualify (DNPQ) |
| Black | Disqualified (DSQ) |
| White | Did not start (DNS) |
| White | Withdrew (WD) |
| White | Race cancelled (C) |
| Blank | Did not practice (DNP) |
| Blank | Did not arrive (DNA) |
| Blank | Excluded (EX) |

- † Driver did not finish but was classified, having completed more than 90% of race distance.
