= Andrés Ríos (racing driver) =

Argentine racing driver

Andres Miguel Ríos (born April 28, 1984 in Rosario, Santa Fe) is an Argentine racing driver. He has run in different series, and took part in 44 races. He achieved two wins, nine podiums and no pole positions, with a race win percentage of 5%. In 2009, he raced with Julio Francischetti, ending in the 22º position.

== Career highlights ==
- Argentina Formula Renault
- Italian Formula Renault Championship
- FIA GT3 European Championship
- TC2000
