= José María López =

Argentine race car driver (born 1983)

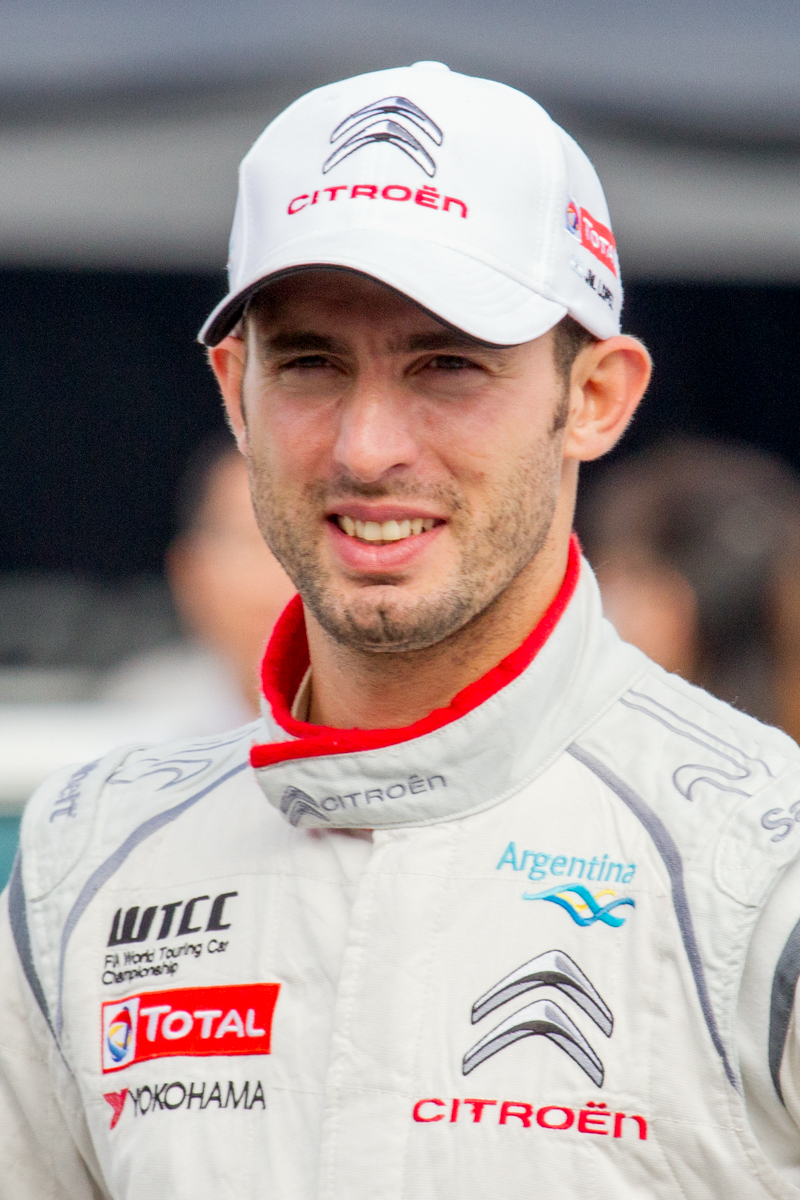
- López at the 2014 FIA WTCC Race of Japan
- Nationality: (Argentina) Argentine
- Born: 26 April 1983 (age 43) Río Tercero, Argentina

World Touring Car Championship career
- Debut season: 2013
- Current team: Citroën Racing
- Categorisation: FIA Platinum
- Car number: 37
- Former teams: Wiechers-Sport
- Starts: 71
- Wins: 29
- Podiums: 48
- Poles: 20
- Fastest laps: 29
- Best finish: 1st in 2014, 2015, 2016

Formula E career
- Debut season: 2016–17
- Car number: 7
- Former teams: DS Virgin Racing, Geox Dragon Racing
- Starts: 33
- Championships: 0
- Wins: 0
- Podiums: 2
- Poles: 0
- Fastest laps: 1
- Best finish: 9th in 2016–17
- Finished last season: 21st

Previous series
- 2012–13 2008–13 2008–13 2008 2007–11 2007 2005–06 2004 2003–04 2003, 2005–06 2002 2001–02: Super TC 2000; Top Race V6; Turismo Carretera; FIA GT Championship; TC 2000 Championship; American Le Mans Series; GP2 Series; International Formula 3000; Formula Renault V6 Eurocup; Formula One testing Formula Renault Italia; FR2000 Eurocup

Championship titles
- 2019–2021 2014–2016 2012 2009 2008–09 2003 2002: FIA World Endurance Championship; WTCC; Super TC 2000; Top Race V6; TC 2000 Championship; Formula Renault V6 Eurocup; Formula Renault Italia

José María "Pechito" López (born 26 April 1983) is an Argentine race car driver who is currently competing in the FIA World Endurance Championship with Akkodis ASP. He is three-time World Touring Champion with Citroën in 2014, 2015 and 2016, and two-time World Endurance Champion with Toyota Gazoo Racing in 2020 and 2021, also becoming that last year the second Argentine driver to win the 24 Hours of Le Mans since José Froilán González in 1954.

López raced in the 2006 GP2 Series for the Super Nova team, and previously for the DAMS team, and the CMS team in Formula 3000. He was also at Renault F1 as a test driver. He was supposed to make his Formula One debut in 2010 for US F1 Team but the team shut down before contesting a single race. On 16 December 2013, he joined the Citroën Total WTCC team for the 2014 World Touring Car Championship season. He won ten races that year and clinched his first World Touring Car Championship. In 2015, he repeated the feat, again winning ten races and the championship. In 2016, he again retained the title with eight wins.

== Career ==
=== Early career ===
López began in karting, before moving to the Formula Renault 2000 Eurocup in 2001, finishing in 17th position, taking one pole position and one fastest lap. He stayed in the series for the 2002 season driving for Cram Competition, finishing in fourth position, taking one victory. He also drove for Cram in Italian Formula Renault that year, where he became champion, taking four wins, beating Robert Kubica to the crown. He moved on to the Formula Renault V6 Eurocup in 2003, making his first association with the DAMS team, winning the title with five race wins.

=== Formula 3000 and GP2 ===
In 2004, López moved up to International Formula 3000 with the CMS team, finishing sixth overall. He also continued in the V6 Eurocup that year, driving in four races.

López raced in the inaugural season of the GP2 Series in 2005, making him one of only a select few drivers in the series who had previous experience of a full season in Formula 3000, the series which GP2 replaced. He finished ninth in the standings racing for the DAMS team. For 2006, he moved to the Super Nova Racing team, finishing tenth in the standings.

=== Return to Argentina ===
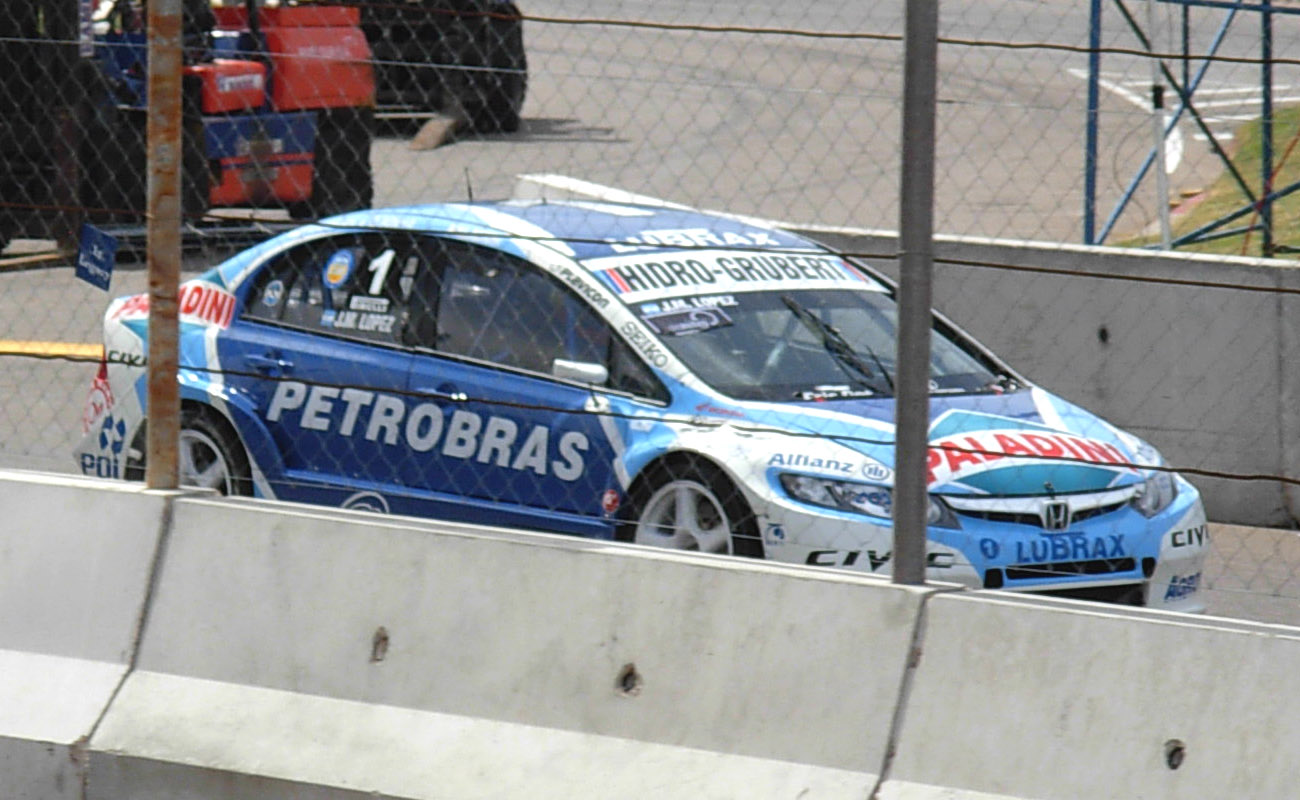
López won the opening round of the 2010 TC 2000 season in Punta del Este, Uruguay.

In the early part of 2007, López raced in the American Le Mans Series, racing a Ferrari 430 GT for Corsa Motorsports/White Lightning in the 12 Hours of Sebring, and for Risi Competizione at St. Petersburg.

López also returned to Argentina in 2007 to race in TC 2000, the country's major production-based touring car championship. He was fifth that year, won the drivers' title in 2008, and successfully defended this crown in 2009. López also joined the Turismo Carretera in 2008 and the Top Race V6 in 2009; he became TRV6 champion in 2009. He narrowly lost out on winning the 2009 Turismo Carretera title after crashing out on an oilspill on the 18th lap of the final race of the season, thereby losing the unique opportunity to win three different championships in the same season.

López also competed in selected races of the FIA GT Championship in 2008 for the ACA Argentina team.

=== Formula One ===
López was a member of the Renault Driver Development programme between 2004 and 2006, and was test driver for Renault F1 during the 2006 season.

In November 2009, López confirmed that he had a deal in place with the new US F1 Team to race in the 2010 Formula One season, provided he secured an eight million-dollar sponsorship package. Sources close to López claimed he already had eighty percent of the funds needed to secure his place in the team.

López was announced as a driver for US F1 on 25 January 2010. Former F1 driver Carlos Reutemann, a close friend of US F1 principal Peter Windsor and a leading politician in Argentina, helped put the funding package together for López. Complications in USF1's progress and uncertainty over whether USF1 would be able to stay in F1 for 2010 caused rumours to surface that López was in talks with rival team Campos, to secure his place in F1. This was confirmed by his manager in late February. On 2 March 2010, he was freed from his contract due to US F1 not being able to attempt to race. On 4 March, Karun Chandhok completed the 2010 grid by signing for Campos (later renamed as the Hispania Racing F1 Team), leaving López without a race drive.

=== Return to Argentina ===
In 2010, López remained driving for Honda in the Argentine TC 2000 championship, finishing 6th. In that year he was granted the Platinum Konex Award as the best racing driver of the last decade in Argentina. For 2011 he switched to Fiat. In 2012, he won the (super) TC2000 championship for a third time, with privateer team PSG16.

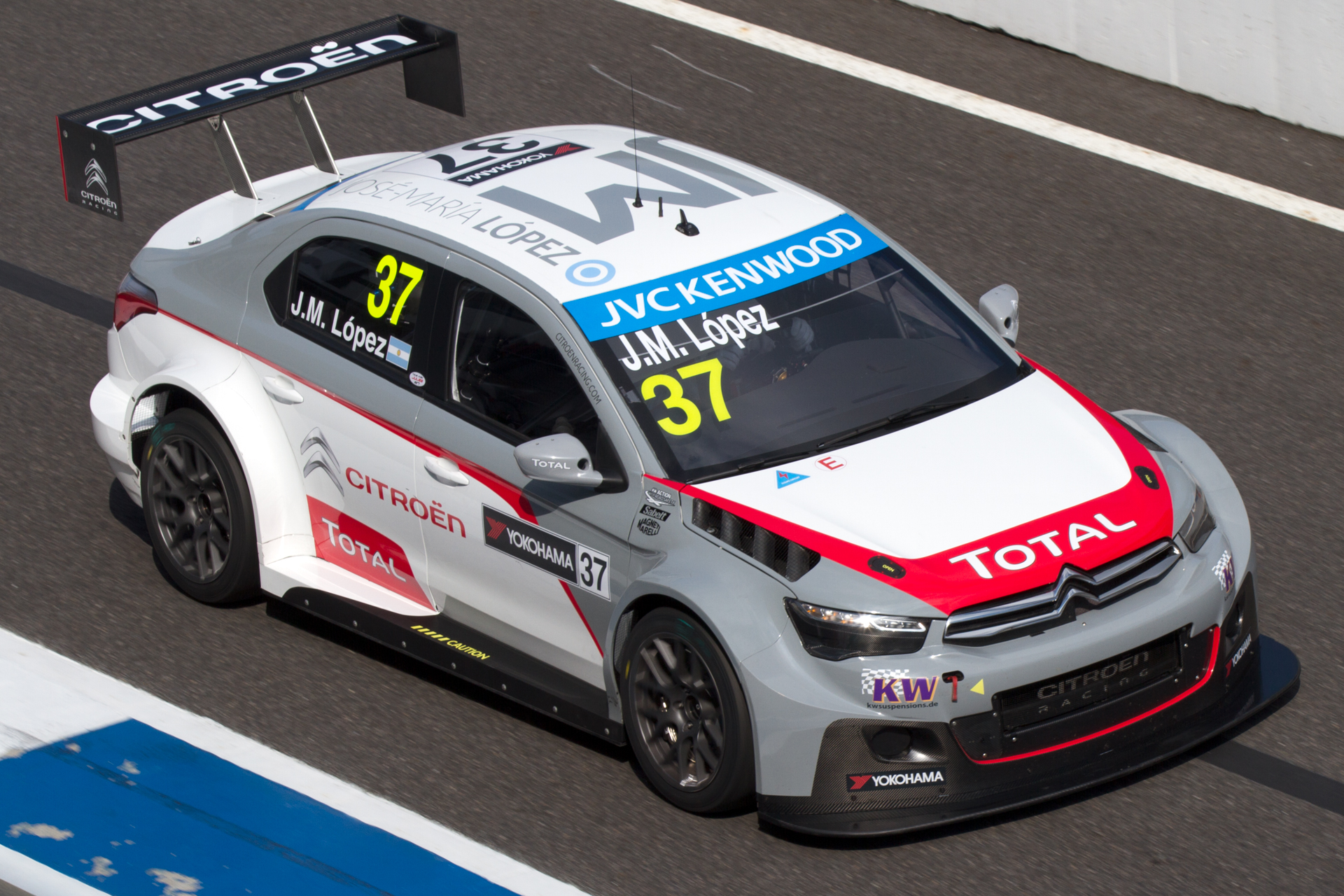
López's Citroën C-Elysée WTCC in the 2014 WTCC season.

=== World Touring Car Championship ===
López made his World Touring Car Championship début with Wiechers-Sport at the 2013 FIA WTCC Race of Argentina, substituting for their regular driver Fredy Barth. He took both Yokohama Independents' Trophy victories and scored an overall victory in race two.

In 2014, López moved to the Citroën team, and became 2014 World Touring Car Champion, clinching the title at Suzuka, thanks to his dominant race car -the Citroën C-Elysée WTCC that got seventeen victories out of 23 races-, but also dominating his two team-mates: Yvan Muller and the circuit races rookie Sébastien Loeb. López finished the season with ten victories, close to Yvan Muller's record.

In 2015, López expected to have more difficulties "I am aware the competition is going to be much stronger because the other drivers are going to know me, they will push harder and you can see this already how Honda is pushing more, the Chevrolet drivers and the same in my Citroën team.", yet he still dominated the first part of the season competition with his team-mates on the Citroën C-Elysée WTCC.

=== Formula E ===
In July 2016, López was confirmed as DS Virgin Racing's second driver for the third season of the FIA Formula E Championship and finished ninth in the Drivers' championship. He returned to Formula E for the 2017–18 campaign at the Marrakesh round for Dragon Racing, replacing the outgoing Neel Jani.

=== FIA World Endurance Championship ===
==== 2017: Debut with Toyota Gazoo Racing ====
On 4 February 2017, FIA World Endurance Championship side, Toyota Gazoo Racing announced that López will join the team for the 2017 FIA World Endurance Championship, driving the No. 7 Toyota TS050 Hybrid alongside Kamui Kobayashi and Mike Conway. Previously, he had expressed interest in driving for the team after several rounds of testing in 2015.

López made his WEC debut at Silverstone, where he crashed his car shortly after the half-way mark. He was evaluated for back pain and taken to a local hospital for precaution. As a result of his injury, he missed out on the Spa-Francorchamps round.

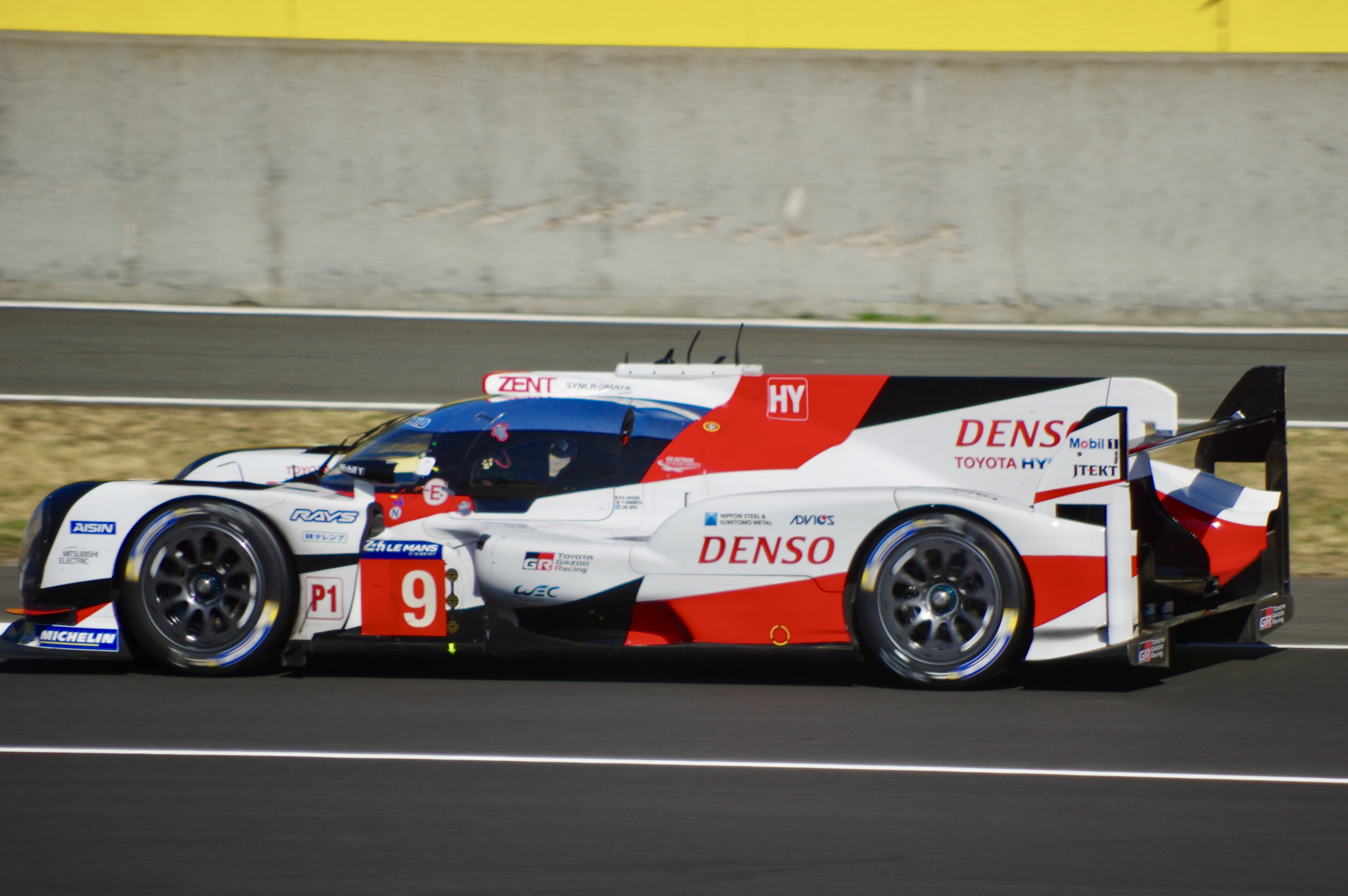
The No. 9 car during the 2017 24 Hours of Le Mans

On 16 May, Toyota announced that they decided to move López to their third car, the No. 9 for Le Mans, swapping seat with Stephane Sarrazin and linking up with Yuji Kunimoto and Nicolas Lapierre. The trio took fifth during qualifying but would retire from the race after the No. 9 car was hit in the rear by an LMP2 car, resulting in a broken wheel that damaged the car's hydraulic and oil lines.

López returned to the No. 7 car for the Nürburgring round where he took his first WEC podium by finishing third, a minute behind the race-winning No. 2 Porsche 919 Hybrid due to the TS050 Hybrid's struggle with grip and pace. The trio finished in back-to-back fourth places at Mexico and Austin.

The No. 7 car finished second behind the sister car No. 8 at their home race at Fuji, earning López's second WEC podium. He finished his debut season in sixth in the World Endurance Drivers' Championship with 84.5 points.

==== 2018–19: First wins and runner-up in the championship ====
On 30 January 2018, Toyota confirmed that López will contest the 2018–19 FIA World Endurance Championship in an unchanged No. 7 lineup.

== Racing record ==
=== Racing career summary ===
| Season | Series | Team | Races | Wins | Poles | F/Laps | Podiums | Points | Position |
|---|---|---|---|---|---|---|---|---|---|
| 2001 | Formula Renault 2000 Eurocup | Lucidi Motorsport | 10 | 2 | 1 | 1 | 2 | 24 | 17th |
| 2002 | Formula Renault 2000 Italia | Cram Competition | 10 | 4 | 5 | 4 | 7 | 205 | **1st** |
| 2002 | Formula Renault 2000 Eurocup | Cram Competition | 6 | 1 | 1 | 0 | 3 | 100 | 4th |
| 2003 | Formula Renault V6 Eurocup | DAMS | 18 | 5 | 8 | 8 | 12 | 354 | **1st** |
| 2004 | Formula Renault V6 Eurocup | DAMS | 4 | 0 | 1 | 0 | 0 | 2 | 27th |
| 2004 | International Formula 3000 Championship | CMS Performance | 10 | 0 | 0 | 2 | 2 | 28 | 6th |
| 2005 | GP2 Series | DAMS | 22 | 1 | 0 | 0 | 3 | 36 | 9th |
| 2006 | GP2 Series | Super Nova Racing | 21 | 0 | 1 | 1 | 3 | 30 | 10th |
| 2007 | TC 2000 Championship | Honda Racing | 11 | 3 | 2 | 3 | 5 | 104 | 5th |
| 2007 | American Le Mans Series – GT2 | Risi Competizione | 1 | 0 | 0 | 0 | 0 | 0 | NC† |
| 2008 | TC 2000 Championship | Honda Petrobras | 14 | 4 | 8 | 3 | 5 | 174 | **1st** |
| 2008 | Turismo Carretera | HAZ Racing Team | 13 | 0 | 0 | 0 | 0 | 109.5 | 15th |
| 2008 | FIA GT Championship – GT1 | Escudería ACA Argentina | 4 | 0 | 0 | 0 | 0 | 6 | 19th |
| 2009 | TC 2000 Championship | Equipo Petrobras | 13 | 4 | 9 | 7 | 7 | 158 | **1st** |
| 2009 | Turismo Carretera | HAZ Racing Team | 16 | 2 | 5 | 5 | 5 | 196.75 | **2nd** |
| 2009 | Top Race V6 | Sportteam V6 | 12 | 5 | 8 | 7 | 6 | 57 | **1st** |
| 2010 | TC 2000 Championship | Equipo Petrobras | 13 | 1 | 2 | 3 | 4 | 83 | 6th |
| 2010 | Turismo Carretera | Oil Competición | 10 | 0 | 0 | 0 | 0 | 28.5 | 36th |
| 2010 | Top Race V6 Copa América | AS Racing | 3 | 0 | 1 | 0 | 0 | 33 | 22nd |
| 2010 | Top Race V6 Torneo Clausura | Oil Competición | 6 | 0 | 0 | 0 | 2 | 5 | **3rd** |
| 2010 | FIA GT1 World Championship | Young Driver AMR | 2 | 0 | 1 | 0 | 0 | 10 | 37th |
| 2011 | TC 2000 Championship | Equipo Fiat Oil Combustibles | 11 | 1 | 2 | 1 | 4 | 149 | 5th |
| 2011 | Turismo Carretera | Oil Competición | 10 | 0 | 0 | 0 | 0 | 28.5 | 36th |
| 2011 | Top Race V6 | Oil Competición | 12 | 0 | 0 | 2 | 4 | 70 | **2nd** |
| 2012 | Súper TC2000 | Pro Racing | 13 | 4 | 6 | 6 | 5 | 203.5 | **1st** |
| 2012 | Turismo Carretera | Oil Competición | 14 | 0 | 1 | 1 | 0 | 95 | 23rd |
| 2012 | Top Race V6 | Tauro Guidi Team | 8 | 0 | 1 | 1 | 0 | 0 | 25th |
| 2013 | Súper TC2000 | Equipo Petronas | 12 | 1 | 1 | 2 | 5 | 147 | 5th |
| 2013 | Turismo Carretera | Oil C5N Competición | 14 | 1 | 4 | 2 | 4 | 367.25 | 9th |
| 2013 | Top Race V6 | PSG16 | 11 | 2 | 5 | 5 | 8 | 78 | **2nd** |
| 2013 | World Touring Car Championship | Wiechers-Sport | 2 | 1 | 0 | 0 | 1 | 35 | 15th |
| 2014 | World Touring Car Championship | Citroën Total WTCC | 23 | 10 | 7 | 11 | 17 | 462 | **1st** |
| 2015 | World Touring Car Championship | Citroën Total WTCC | 24 | 10 | 7 | 9 | 19 | 475 | **1st** |
| 2015 | Stock Car Brasil | Red Bull Racing | 1 | 0 | 0 | 0 | 0 | 0 | NC† |
| 2016 | World Touring Car Championship | Citroën Racing | 22 | 7 | 4 | 8 | 10 | 381 | **1st** |
| 2016–17 | Formula E | DS Virgin Racing | 10 | 0 | 0 | 0 | 2 | 65 | 9th |
| 2017 | FIA World Endurance Championship – LMP1 | Toyota Gazoo Racing | 8 | 0 | 3 | 0 | 2 | 84.5 | 6th |
| 2017 | 24 Hours of Le Mans – LMP1 | Toyota Gazoo Racing | 1 | 0 | 0 | 0 | 0 | N/A | DNF |
| 2017 | Súper TC2000 | Toyota Gazoo Racing Argentina | 1 | 0 | 0 | 0 | 0 | 0 | NC† |
| 2017–18 | Formula E | Dragon Racing | 12 | 0 | 0 | 1 | 0 | 14 | 17th |
| 2018 | 24 Hours of Le Mans – LMP1 | Toyota Gazoo Racing | 1 | 0 | 0 | 0 | 1 | N/A | **2nd** |
| 2018 | Súper TC2000 | Toyota Gazoo Racing Argentina | 1 | 0 | 0 | 0 | 0 | 0 | NC† |
| 2018–19 | FIA World Endurance Championship – LMP1 | Toyota Gazoo Racing | 8 | 2 | 1 | 1 | 6 | 157 | **2nd** |
| 2018–19 | Formula E | GEOX Dragon | 13 | 0 | 0 | 0 | 0 | 3 | 21st |
| 2019 | 24 Hours of Le Mans – LMP1 | Toyota Gazoo Racing | 1 | 0 | 1 | 0 | 1 | N/A | **2nd** |
| 2019–20 | FIA World Endurance Championship – LMP1 | Toyota Gazoo Racing | 8 | 4 | 3 | 1 | 4 | 207 | **1st** |
| 2020 | DTM Trophy | TGR Ring Racing | 4 | 0 | 0 | 0 | 0 | 12 | 17th |
| 2020 | 24 Hours of Le Mans – LMP1 | Toyota Gazoo Racing | 1 | 0 | 1 | 0 | 1 | N/A | **3rd** |
| 2021 | FIA World Endurance Championship – Hypercar | Toyota Gazoo Racing | 6 | 3 | 4 | 1 | 3 | 173 | **1st** |
| 2021 | 24 Hours of Le Mans – Hypercar | Toyota Gazoo Racing | 1 | 1 | 1 | 0 | 1 | N/A | **1st** |
| 2021 | Súper TC2000 | Toyota Gazoo Racing YPF Infinia | 1 | 0 | 0 | 0 | 0 | 0 | NC† |
| 2022 | FIA World Endurance Championship – Hypercar | Toyota Gazoo Racing | 6 | 2 | 1 | 1 | 3 | 133 | **3rd** |
| 2022 | 24 Hours of Le Mans – Hypercar | Toyota Gazoo Racing | 1 | 0 | 0 | 1 | 1 | N/A | **2nd** |
| 2022 | IMSA SportsCar Championship – DPi | Ally Cadillac | 2 | 0 | 0 | 0 | 0 | 566 | 17th |
| 2023 | FIA World Endurance Championship – Hypercar | Toyota Gazoo Racing | 7 | 4 | 3 | 0 | 5 | 145 | **2nd** |
| 2023 | European Le Mans Series – LMP2 | Cool Racing | 6 | 0 | 2 | 0 | 1 | 69 | 6th |
| 2023 | 24 Hours of Le Mans – Hypercar | Toyota Gazoo Racing | 1 | 0 | 0 | 0 | 0 | N/A | DNF |
| 2024 | FIA World Endurance Championship – LMGT3 | Akkodis ASP Team | 7 | 0 | 0 | 0 | 0 | 0 | 32nd |
| 2024 | FIA World Endurance Championship – Hypercar | Toyota Gazoo Racing | 1 | 0 | 0 | 0 | 1 | 36 | 16th |
| 2024 | 24 Hours of Le Mans – Hypercar | Toyota Gazoo Racing | 1 | 0 | 0 | 0 | 1 | N/A | **2nd** |
| 2024 | TCR South America Touring Car Championship | Toyota Team Argentina | | | | | | | |
| 2025 | FIA World Endurance Championship – LMGT3 | Akkodis ASP Team | 7 | 2 | 0 | 0 | 2 | 95 | **3rd** |
| 2025 | 24 Hours of Le Mans - LMGT3 | Akkodis ASP Team | 1 | 0 | 0 | 0 | 0 | N/A | 5th |
| 2025 | FIA World Endurance Championship – Hypercar | Toyota Gazoo Racing | 1 | 0 | 0 | 0 | 0 | 0 | 32nd |
| 2025 | 24 Hours of Le Mans - Hypercar | Toyota Gazoo Racing | Reserve driver | | | | | | |
| 2025 | IMSA SportsCar Championship – GTD Pro | Vasser Sullivan Racing | 1 | 0 | 0 | 0 | 0 | 224 | 38th |
| 2026 | FIA World Endurance Championship - LMGT3 | Akkodis ASP Team | 8 | 0 | 0 | 0 | 0 | 38 | 15th |
| 2026 | 24 Hours of Le Mans - LMGT3 | Akkodis ASP Team | 1 | 0 | 0 | 0 | 0 | N/A | 4th |
| 2026 | 24 Hours of Le Mans - Hypercar | Toyota Racing | Reserve driver | | | | | | |

^{†} As López was a guest driver, he was ineligible for championship points.

=== Complete Formula Renault 2.0 Eurocup results ===
(key) (Races in bold indicate pole position; races in italics indicate fastest lap.)

| Year | Entrant | 1 | 2 | 3 | 4 | 5 | 6 | 7 | 8 | 9 | 10 | DC | Points |
|---|---|---|---|---|---|---|---|---|---|---|---|---|---|
| 2001 | Lucidi Motorsport | MNZ; 11 | BRN; 23 | MAG; 24 | SIL; Ret | ZOL; Ret | HUN; 10 | A1R; 11 | **NÜR**; 24 | JAR; 7 | EST; 6 | 17th | 24 |
| 2002 | Cram Competition | MAG | SIL | JAR; 1 | AND; 7 | OSC; 4 | SPA; 2 | **IMO**; Ret | DON | EST; 3 | | 4th | 100 |

=== Complete Formula Renault 2.0 Italia results ===
(key) (Races in bold indicate pole position; races in italics indicate fastest lap.)

| Year | Entrant | 1 | 2 | 3 | 4 | 5 | 6 | 7 | 8 | 9 | 10 | DC | Points |
|---|---|---|---|---|---|---|---|---|---|---|---|---|---|
| 2002 | Cram Competition | VLL; 13 | PER; Ret | PER; 2 | **SPA**; 3 | MGI; 3 | **MNZ**; 1 | **VAR**; 1 | IMO; 5 | **MIS**; 1 | MUG; 1 | 1st | 205 |

=== Complete Formula Renault V6 Eurocup results ===
(key) (Races in bold indicate pole position) (Races in italics indicate fastest lap)

| Year | Entrant | 1 | 2 | 3 | 4 | 5 | 6 | 7 | 8 | 9 | 10 | 11 | 12 | 13 | 14 | 15 | 16 | 17 | 18 | 19 | DC | Points |
|---|---|---|---|---|---|---|---|---|---|---|---|---|---|---|---|---|---|---|---|---|---|---|
| 2003 | DAMS | **CAT**; **1** Ret | **CAT**; **2**; 13 | MAG; 1 Ret | MAG; 2; 3 | MON; 3 | **DON**; **1**; 1 | DON; 2; 3 | SPA1; 7 | SPA2; 1; 2 | SPA2; 2; 1 | **AND**; **1**; 1 | **AND**; **2**; 2 | **OSC**; **1**; 2 | **OSC**; **2**; 1 | **EST**; **1**; 1 | EST; 2; 5 | MNZ; 1; 3 | MNZ; 2 Ret | | 1st | 354 |
| 2004 | DAMS | MNZ; 1 | MNZ; 2 | VAL; 1 | VAL; 2 | MAG; 1 | MAG; 2 | MON | BRN; 1 | BRN; 2 | DON; 1 | DON; 2 | SPA; 1 | SPA; 2 | IMO; 1 | IMO; 2 | **OSC**; **1** Ret | OSC; 2 Ret | DUB; 1; 12 | DUB; 2; 11 | 27th | 2 |

=== Complete International Formula 3000 results ===
(key) (Races in bold indicate pole position; races in italics indicate fastest lap.)

| Year | Entrant | 1 | 2 | 3 | 4 | 5 | 6 | 7 | 8 | 9 | 10 | DC | Points |
|---|---|---|---|---|---|---|---|---|---|---|---|---|---|
| 2004 | CMS Performance | IMO; Ret | CAT; 6 | MON; 3 | NÜR; 5 | MAG; Ret | SIL; 4 | HOC; 6 | HUN; 8 | SPA; 3 | MNZ; Ret | 6th | 28 |

=== Complete GP2 Series results ===
(key) (Races in bold indicate pole position) (Races in italics indicate fastest lap)

| Year | Entrant | 1 | 2 | 3 | 4 | 5 | 6 | 7 | 8 | 9 | 10 | 11 | 12 | 13 | 14 | 15 | 16 | 17 | 18 | 19 | 20 | 21 | 22 | 23 | DC | Points |
|---|---|---|---|---|---|---|---|---|---|---|---|---|---|---|---|---|---|---|---|---|---|---|---|---|---|---|
| 2005 | DAMS | IMO; FEA; 2 | IMO; SPR; 11 | CAT; FEA; 6 | CAT; SPR; 1 | MON; FEA; Ret | NÜR; FEA; 13 | NÜR; SPR; 14 | MAG; FEA; 2 | MAG; SPR; Ret | SIL; FEA; 9 | SIL; SPR; DNS | HOC; FEA; 13 | HOC; SPR; 10 | HUN; FEA; Ret | HUN; SPR; Ret | IST; FEA; 6 | IST; SPR; 7 | MNZ; FEA; Ret | MNZ; SPR; Ret | SPA; FEA; 10 | SPA; SPR; 8 | BHR; FEA; 4 | BHR; SPR; 4 | 9th | 36 |
| 2006 | Super Nova International | VAL; FEA; 5 | VAL; SPR; Ret | IMO; FEA; Ret | IMO; SPR; 19^{†} | NÜR; FEA; 4 | NÜR; SPR; 3 | CAT; FEA; Ret | CAT; SPR; Ret | MON; FEA; NC | SIL; FEA; Ret | SIL; SPR; 14 | **MAG**; **FEA**; 3 | MAG; SPR; Ret | HOC; FEA; 7 | HOC; SPR; 2 | HUN; FEA; 8 | HUN; SPR; Ret | IST; FEA; 9 | IST; SPR; 11 | MNZ; FEA; Ret | MNZ; SPR; Ret | | | 10th | 30 |

=== Complete GT1 World Championship results ===
| Year | Team | Car | 1 | 2 | 3 | 4 | 5 | 6 | 7 | 8 | 9 | 10 | 11 | 12 | 13 | 14 | 15 | 16 | 17 | 18 | 19 | 20 | Pos | Points |
|---|---|---|---|---|---|---|---|---|---|---|---|---|---|---|---|---|---|---|---|---|---|---|---|---|
| 2010 | Young Driver AMR | Aston Martin DBR9 | ABU; QR | ABU; CR | SIL; QR | SIL; CR | BRN; QR | BRN; CR | PRI; QR | PRI; CR | SPA; QR | SPA; CR | NÜR; QR | NÜR; CR | ALG; QR | ALG; CR | NAV; QR | NAV; CR | INT; QR | INT; CR | SAN; QR; Ret | SAN; CR; 5 | 37th | 10 |

=== Complete World Touring Car Championship results ===
(key) (Races in bold indicate pole position) (Races in italics indicate fastest lap)

| Year | Team | Car | 1 | 2 | 3 | 4 | 5 | 6 | 7 | 8 | 9 | 10 | 11 | 12 | 13 | 14 | 15 | 16 | 17 | 18 | 19 | 20 | 21 | 22 | 23 | 24 | Pos. | Pts |
|---|---|---|---|---|---|---|---|---|---|---|---|---|---|---|---|---|---|---|---|---|---|---|---|---|---|---|---|---|
| 2013 | Wiechers-Sport | BMW 320 TC | ITA; 1 | ITA; 2 | MAR; 1 | MAR; 2 | SVK; 1 | SVK; 2 | HUN; 1 | HUN; 2 | AUT; 1 | AUT; 2 | RUS; 1 | RUS; 2 | POR; 1 | POR; 2 | ARG; 1; 5 | **ARG**; **2**; 1 | USA; 1 | USA; 2 | JPN; 1 | JPN; 2 | CHN; 1 | CHN; 2 | MAC; 1 | MAC; 2 | 15th | 35 |
| 2014 | Citroën Total WTCC | Citroën C-Elysée WTCC | **MAR**; **1**; 1 | MAR; 2; 2 | FRA; 1; 4 | FRA; 2; 1 | HUN; 1; 2 | HUN; 2; 6 | **SVK**; **1**; 2 | SVK; 2 C | AUT; 1; 3 | AUT; 2; 1 | **RUS**; **1**; 1 | RUS; 2 Ret | BEL; 1; 2 | BEL; 2; 1 | **ARG**; **1**; 1 | ARG; 2; 1 | BEI; 1; 3 | BEI; 2; 4 | **CHN**; **1**; 1 | CHN; 2; 3 | **JPN**; **1**; 1 | JPN; 2; 6 | **MAC**; **1**; 1 | MAC; 2; 5 | **1st** | **462** |
| 2015 | Citroën Total WTCC | Citroën C-Elysée WTCC | **ARG**; **1**; 1 | ARG; 2; 2 | **MAR**; **1**; 1 | MAR; 2; 3 | HUN; 1; 1 | HUN; 2; 6 | **GER**; **1**; 1 | GER; 2; 2 | RUS; 1; 2 | RUS; 2; 12 | SVK; 1; 2 | SVK; 2; 2 | FRA; 1; 3 | FRA; 2; 1 | **POR**; **1**; 1 | POR; 2; 5 | JPN; 1; 1 | JPN; 2 Ret | **CHN**; **1**; 1 | CHN; 2; 3 | **THA**; **1**; 1 | THA; 2; 3 | **QAT**; **1**; 1 | QAT; 2; 8 | 1st | 475 |
| 2016 | Citroën Racing | Citroën C-Elysée WTCC | FRA; 1; 6 | **FRA**; **2**; 1 | SVK; 1; 5 | SVK; 2; 1 | HUN; 1; 13 | **HUN**; **2**; 1 | MAR; 1; 2 | MAR; 2; 1 | GER; 1; 1 | **GER**; **2**; 1 | RUS; 1; 5 | RUS; 2; 8 | POR; 1; 5 | POR; 2; 5 | ARG; 1; 5 | **ARG**; **2**; 1 | JPN; 1; 4 | **JPN**; **2**; 2 | CHN; 1; 4 | **CHN**; **2**; 1 | QAT; 1; 9 | QAT; 2; 3 | | | 1st | 381 |

=== Complete Formula E results ===
(key) (Races in bold indicate pole position; races in italics indicate fastest lap)

| Year | Team | Chassis | Powertrain | 1 | 2 | 3 | 4 | 5 | 6 | 7 | 8 | 9 | 10 | 11 | 12 | 13 | Pos | Points |
|---|---|---|---|---|---|---|---|---|---|---|---|---|---|---|---|---|---|---|
| 2016–17 | DS Virgin Racing | Spark SRT01-e | DS Virgin DSV-02 | HKG; Ret | MRK; 10 | BUE; 10 | MEX; 6 | MCO; Ret | PAR; 2 | BER; 4 | BER; 5 | NYC | NYC | MTL; Ret | MTL; 3 | | 9th | 65 |
| 2017–18 | Dragon Racing | Spark SRT01-e | Penske EV-2 | HKG | HKG | MRK; 6 | SCL; Ret | MEX; 12 | PDE; 8 | RME; 17† | PAR; 10 | BER; 18 | ZUR; 12 | NYC; Ret | NYC; Ret | | 17th | 14 |
| 2018–19 | GEOX Dragon | Spark SRT05e | Penske EV-3 | ADR; Ret | MRK; 11 | SCL; 9 | MEX; 17 | HKG; 11 | SYX; Ret | RME; 16 | PAR; 13 | MCO; 10 | BER; 20 | BRN; DSQ | NYC; 12 | NYC; Ret | 21st | 3 |

^{†} Driver did not finish the race, but was classified as he completed more than 90% of the race distance.

=== Complete FIA World Endurance Championship results ===
| Year | Entrant | Class | Chassis | Engine | 1 | 2 | 3 | 4 | 5 | 6 | 7 | 8 | 9 | Rank | Points |
|---|---|---|---|---|---|---|---|---|---|---|---|---|---|---|---|
| 2017 | Toyota Gazoo Racing | LMP1 | Toyota TS050 Hybrid | Toyota H8909 2.4 L Turbo V6 (Hybrid) | **SIL**; 13 | SPA | LMS; Ret | **NÜR**; 3 | MEX; 4 | COA; 4 | FUJ; 2 | **SHA**; 4 | BHR; 4 | 6th | 84.5 |
| 2018–19 | Toyota Gazoo Racing | LMP1 | Toyota TS050 Hybrid | Toyota H8909 2.4 L Turbo V6 (Hybrid) | SPA; 2 | LMS; 2 | **SIL**; DSQ | FUJ; 1 | **SHA**; 1 | SEB; 2 | **SPA**; 6 | **LMS**; 2 | | 2nd | 157 |
| 2019–20 | Toyota Gazoo Racing | LMP1 | Toyota TS050 Hybrid | Toyota H8909 2.4 L Turbo V6 (Hybrid) | **SIL**; 1 | FUJ; 2 | SHA; 3 | BHR; 1 | COA; 3 | SPA; 1 | **LMS**; 3 | **BHR**; 1 | | 1st | 207 |
| 2021 | Toyota Gazoo Racing | Hypercar | Toyota GR010 Hybrid | Toyota H8909 3.5 L Turbo V6 (Hybrid) | **SPA**; 3 | ALG; 2 | **MNZ**; 1 | **LMS**; 1 | BHR; 1 | **BHR**; 2 | | | | 1st | 173 |
| 2022 | Toyota Gazoo Racing | Hypercar | Toyota GR010 Hybrid | Toyota H8909 3.5 L Turbo V6 (Hybrid) | SEB; Ret | SPA; 1 | LMS; 2 | MNZ; 3 | **FUJ**; 2 | BHR; 1 | | | | 3rd | 133 |
| 2023 | Toyota Gazoo Racing | Hypercar | Toyota GR010 Hybrid | Toyota H8909 3.5 L Turbo V6 (Hybrid) | SEB; 1 | ALG; 9 | **SPA**; 1 | LMS; Ret | **MNZ**; 1 | **FUJ**; 1 | BHR; 2 | | | 2nd | 145 |
| 2024 | Akkodis ASP Team | LMGT3 | Lexus RC F GT3 | Lexus 2UR-GSE 5.0 L V8 | QAT; 16 | IMO; 15 | SPA; 14 | | SÃO; 11 | COA; 11 | FUJ; 12 | BHR; Ret | | 32nd | 0 |
| 2024 | Toyota Gazoo Racing | Hypercar | Toyota GR010 Hybrid | Toyota H8909 3.5L Turbo V6 (Hybrid) | | | | LMS; 2 | | | | | | 16th | 36 |
| 2025 | Akkodis ASP Team | LMGT3 | Lexus RC F GT3 | Lexus 2UR-GSE 5.0 L V8 | QAT; Ret | IMO; 4 | SPA; Ret | LMS; 5 | SÃO; 1 | | FUJ; 15 | BHR; 1 | | 3rd | 95 |
| 2025 | Toyota Gazoo Racing | Hypercar | Toyota GR010 Hybrid | Toyota H8909 3.5L Turbo V6 (Hybrid) | | | | | | COA; 14 | | | | 32nd | 0 |
| 2026 | Akkodis ASP Team | LMGT3 | Lexus RC F GT3 | Lexus 2UR-GSE 5.0 L V8 | IMO; Ret | SPA; 6 | LMS; 4 | SÃO; 7 | COA; 13 | FUJ; 11 | CAT; 13 | MNZ; Ret | | 15th | 38 |

=== Complete 24 Hours of Le Mans results ===
| Year | Team | Co-Drivers | Car | Class | Laps | Pos. | Class Pos. |
|---|---|---|---|---|---|---|---|
| 2017 | (Japan) Toyota Gazoo Racing | (France) Nicolas Lapierre (Japan) Yuji Kunimoto | Toyota TS050 Hybrid | LMP1 | 160 | DNF | DNF |
| 2018 | (Japan) Toyota Gazoo Racing | (United Kingdom) Mike Conway (Japan) Kamui Kobayashi | Toyota TS050 Hybrid | LMP1 | 386 | **2nd** | **2nd** |
| 2019 | (Japan) Toyota Gazoo Racing | (United Kingdom) Mike Conway (Japan) Kamui Kobayashi | Toyota TS050 Hybrid | LMP1 | 385 | **2nd** | **2nd** |
| 2020 | (Japan) Toyota Gazoo Racing | (United Kingdom) Mike Conway (Japan) Kamui Kobayashi | Toyota TS050 Hybrid | LMP1 | 381 | **3rd** | **3rd** |
| 2021 | (Japan) Toyota Gazoo Racing | (United Kingdom) Mike Conway (Japan) Kamui Kobayashi | Toyota GR010 Hybrid | Hypercar | 371 | **1st** | **1st** |
| 2022 | (Japan) Toyota Gazoo Racing | (United Kingdom) Mike Conway (Japan) Kamui Kobayashi | Toyota GR010 Hybrid | Hypercar | 380 | **2nd** | **2nd** |
| 2023 | (Japan) Toyota Gazoo Racing | (United Kingdom) Mike Conway (Japan) Kamui Kobayashi | Toyota GR010 Hybrid | Hypercar | 103 | DNF | DNF |
| 2024 | (Japan) Toyota Gazoo Racing | (Japan) Kamui Kobayashi (Netherlands) Nyck de Vries | Toyota GR010 Hybrid | Hypercar | 311 | **2nd** | **2nd** |
| 2025 | (France) Akkodis ASP Team | (Austria) Clemens Schmid (Romania) Petru Umbrărescu | Lexus RC F GT3 | LMGT3 | 340 | 37th | 5th |
| 2026 | (France) Akkodis ASP Team | (Austria) Clemens Schmid (Romania) Petru Umbrărescu | Lexus RC F GT3 | LMGT3 | 335 | 36th | 4th |

=== Complete IMSA SportsCar Championship results ===
(key)(Races in bold indicate pole position)

| Year | Team | Class | Make | Engine | 1 | 2 | 3 | 4 | 5 | 6 | 7 | 8 | 9 | 10 | Rank | Points |
|---|---|---|---|---|---|---|---|---|---|---|---|---|---|---|---|---|
| 2022 | Ally Cadillac | DPi | Cadillac DPi-V.R | Cadillac 5.5 L V8 | DAY; 5 | SEB; 6 | LBH | LGA | MDO | DET | WGL | MOS | ELK | PET | 17th | 566 |
| 2025 | Vasser Sullivan Racing | GTD Pro | Lexus RC F GT3 | Toyota 2UR-GSE 5.0 L V8 | DAY | SEB; 11 | LGA | DET | WGL | MOS | ELK | VIR | IMS | PET | 38th | 224 |

=== Complete European Le Mans Series results ===
(key) (Races in bold indicate pole position; results in italics indicate fastest lap)

| Year | Entrant | Class | Chassis | Engine | 1 | 2 | 3 | 4 | 5 | 6 | Rank | Points |
|---|---|---|---|---|---|---|---|---|---|---|---|---|
| 2023 | Cool Racing | LMP2 | Oreca 07 | Gibson GK428 4.2 L V8 | **CAT**; 4 | **LEC**; 4 | ARA; 5 | SPA; 3 | POR; 4 | ALG; 7 | 6th | 69 |

Sporting positions
| Preceded by Ryan Briscoe | Italian Formula Renault Championship; Champion; 2002 | Succeeded by Franck Perera |
| Preceded by Inaugural | Formula Renault V6 Eurocup; Champion; 2003 | Succeeded by Giorgio Mondini |
| Preceded by Juan Manuel Silva; Ezequiel Bosio | Winner of the 200 km de Buenos Aires; 2008; With: Anthony Reid | Succeeded by Norberto Fontana; Ricardo Mauricio |
| Preceded by Matías Rossi | TC 2000 Championship; Champion; 2008–2009 | Succeeded by Norberto Fontana |
| Preceded by Emiliano Spataro | Top Race V6; Champion; 2009 | Succeeded by Guido Falaschi (Copa América); Agustín Canapino (Close Tournament) |
| Preceded by Matías Rossi | Súper TC 2000 Championship; Champion; 2012 | Succeeded by Matías Rossi |
| Preceded by Yvan Muller | World Touring Car Championship; Champion; 2014, 2015, 2016 | Succeeded by Thed Björk |
| Preceded by Sébastien Buemi; Kazuki Nakajima; Fernando Alonso | World Endurance Drivers Champion; 2019–20, 2021; With: Mike Conway & Kamui Kobayashi | Succeeded by Sébastien Buemi; Brendon Hartley; Ryō Hirakawa |
| Preceded by Sébastien Buemi; Brendon Hartley; Kazuki Nakajima | Winner of the 24 Hours of Le Mans; 2021; With: Mike Conway & Kamui Kobayashi | Succeeded by Sébastien Buemi; Brendon Hartley; Ryō Hirakawa |
