= 2017 6 Hours of Silverstone =

Sports car endurance race held at Silverstone Circuit, Northamptonshire, England

Track layout of the Silverstone Circuit

The 2017 6 Hours of Silverstone was an endurance sports car racing event held at the Silverstone Circuit in Northamptonshire, England on 14–16 April 2017. Silverstone served as the opening round of the 2017 FIA World Endurance Championship, and was the sixth running of the event as part of the championship. The event was won by the #8 Toyota Gazoo Racing TS050 Hybrid

== Qualifying ==
=== Qualifying results ===
Pole position winners in each class are marked in bold.

| Pos | Class | Team | Average Time | Gap | Grid |
|---|---|---|---|---|---|
| 1 | **LMP1** | **No. 7 Toyota Gazoo Racing** | **1:37.304** | — | **1** |
| 2 | LMP1 | No. 8 Toyota Gazoo Racing | 1:37.593 | +0.289 | 2 |
| 3 | LMP1 | No. 1 Porsche LMP Team | 1:38.615 | +1.311 | 3 |
| 4 | LMP1 | No. 2 Porsche LMP Team | 1:39.063 | +1.759 | 4 |
| 5 | **LMP2** | **No. 26 G-Drive Racing** | **1:44.387** | **+7.083** | **5** |
| 6 | LMP2 | No. 36 Signatech Alpine Matmut | 1:44.433 | +7.129 | 6 |
| 7 | LMP2 | No. 38 Jackie Chan DC Racing | 1:44.591 | +7.287 | 7 |
| 8 | LMP2 | No. 31 Vaillante Rebellion | 1:45.194 | +7.890 | 8 |
| 9 | LMP1 | No. 4 ByKolles Racing Team | 1:45.235 | +7.931 | 9 |
| 10 | LMP2 | No. 13 Vaillante Rebellion | 1:45.323 | +8.019 | 10 |
| 11 | LMP2 | No. 24 CEFC Manor TRS Racing | 1:46.102 | +8.798 | 11 |
| 12 | LMP2 | No. 28 TDS Racing | 1:46.183 | +8.879 | 12 |
| 13 | LMP2 | No. 25 CEFC Manor TRS Racing | 1:46.494 | +9.190 | 13 |
| 14 | LMP2 | No. 37 Jackie Chan DC Racing | 1:47.250 | +9.946 | 14 |
| 15 | **LMGTE Pro** | **No. 67 Ford Chip Ganassi Team UK** | **1:56.202** | **+18.898** | **15** |
| 16 | LMGTE Pro | No. 71 AF Corse | 1:57.011 | +19.707 | 16 |
| 17 | LMGTE Pro | No. 95 Aston Martin Racing | 1:57.117 | +19.813 | 17 |
| 18 | LMGTE Pro | No. 66 Ford Chip Ganassi Team UK | 1:57.269 | +19.965 | 18 |
| 19 | LMGTE Pro | No. 97 Aston Martin Racing | 1:57.414 | +20.110 | 19 |
| 20 | LMGTE Pro | No. 51 AF Corse | 1:57.466 | +20.162 | 20 |
| 21 | LMGTE Pro | No. 91 Porsche GT Team | 1:58.003 | +20.699 | 21 |
| 22 | LMGTE Pro | No. 92 Porsche GT Team | 1:58.066 | +20.762 | 22 |
| 23 | **LMGTE Am** | **No. 98 Aston Martin Racing** | **1:59.562** | **+22.258** | **23** |
| 24 | LMGTE Am | No. 54 Spirit of Race | 2:00.608 | +23.304 | 24 |
| 25 | LMGTE Am | No. 77 Dempsey-Proton Racing | 2:01.347 | +24.043 | 25 |
| 26 | LMGTE Am | No. 61 Clearwater Racing | 2:01.621 | +24.317 | 26 |
| 27 | LMGTE Am | No. 86 Gulf Racing | 2:01.925 | +24.621 | 27 |

== Race ==
=== Race result ===
The minimum number of laps for classification (70% of the overall winning car's race distance) was 138 laps. Class winners in bold.

| Pos | Class | No | Team | Drivers | Chassis | Tyre | Laps | Time/Retired |
| Pos | Class | No | Team | Drivers | Engine | Tyre | Laps | Time/Retired |
|---|---|---|---|---|---|---|---|---|
| 1 | **LMP1** | **8** | **(Japan) Toyota Gazoo Racing** | **(United Kingdom) Anthony Davidson (Switzerland) Sébastien Buemi (Japan) Kazuki Nakajima** | **Toyota TS050 Hybrid** | MI | **197** | **06:00:33.211** |
| 1 | **LMP1** | **8** | **(Japan) Toyota Gazoo Racing** | **(United Kingdom) Anthony Davidson (Switzerland) Sébastien Buemi (Japan) Kazuki Nakajima** | **Toyota 2.4 L Turbo V6** | MI | **197** | **06:00:33.211** |
| 2 | LMP1 | 2 | (Germany) Porsche LMP Team | (Germany) Timo Bernhard (New Zealand) Earl Bamber (New Zealand) Brendon Hartley | Porsche 919 Hybrid | MI | 197 | +6.173 |
| 2 | LMP1 | 2 | (Germany) Porsche LMP Team | (Germany) Timo Bernhard (New Zealand) Earl Bamber (New Zealand) Brendon Hartley | Porsche 2.0 L Turbo V4 | MI | 197 | +6.173 |
| 3 | LMP1 | 1 | (Germany) Porsche LMP Team | (Switzerland) Neel Jani (United Kingdom) Nick Tandy (Germany) André Lotterer | Porsche 919 Hybrid | MI | 197 | +46.956 |
| 3 | LMP1 | 1 | (Germany) Porsche LMP Team | (Switzerland) Neel Jani (United Kingdom) Nick Tandy (Germany) André Lotterer | Porsche 2.0 L Turbo V4 | MI | 197 | +46.956 |
| 4 | **LMP2** | **38** | **(China) Jackie Chan DC Racing** | **(Netherlands) Ho-Pin Tung (United Kingdom) Oliver Jarvis (France) Thomas Laurent** | **Oreca 07** | D | **184** | **+13 Laps** |
| 4 | **LMP2** | **38** | **(China) Jackie Chan DC Racing** | **(Netherlands) Ho-Pin Tung (United Kingdom) Oliver Jarvis (France) Thomas Laurent** | **Gibson GK428 4.2 L V8** | D | **184** | **+13 Laps** |
| 5 | LMP2 | 31 | (Switzerland) Vaillante Rebellion | (France) Julien Canal (France) Nicolas Prost (Brazil) Bruno Senna | Oreca 07 | D | 184 | +13 Laps |
| 5 | LMP2 | 31 | (Switzerland) Vaillante Rebellion | (France) Julien Canal (France) Nicolas Prost (Brazil) Bruno Senna | Gibson GK428 4.2 L V8 | D | 184 | +13 Laps |
| 6 | LMP2 | 28 | (France) TDS Racing | (France) François Perrodo (France) Matthieu Vaxiviere (France) Emmanuel Collard | Oreca 07 | D | 184 | +13 Laps |
| 6 | LMP2 | 28 | (France) TDS Racing | (France) François Perrodo (France) Matthieu Vaxiviere (France) Emmanuel Collard | Gibson GK428 4.2 L V8 | D | 184 | +13 Laps |
| 7 | LMP2 | 36 | (France) Signatech Alpine Matmut | (France) Nicolas Lapierre (United States) Gustavo Menezes (United Kingdom) Matt Rao | Alpine A470 | D | 183 | +14 Laps |
| 7 | LMP2 | 36 | (France) Signatech Alpine Matmut | (France) Nicolas Lapierre (United States) Gustavo Menezes (United Kingdom) Matt Rao | Gibson GK428 4.2 L V8 | D | 183 | +14 Laps |
| 8 | LMP2 | 26 | (Russia) G-Drive Racing | (Russia) Roman Rusinov (France) Pierre Thiriet (United Kingdom) Alex Lynn | Oreca 07 | D | 183 | +14 Laps |
| 8 | LMP2 | 26 | (Russia) G-Drive Racing | (Russia) Roman Rusinov (France) Pierre Thiriet (United Kingdom) Alex Lynn | Gibson GK428 4.2 L V8 | D | 183 | +14 Laps |
| 9 | LMP2 | 24 | (China) CEFC Manor TRS Racing | (Thailand) Tor Graves (Switzerland) Jonathan Hirschi (France) Jean-Éric Vergne | Oreca 07 | D | 183 | +14 Laps |
| 9 | LMP2 | 24 | (China) CEFC Manor TRS Racing | (Thailand) Tor Graves (Switzerland) Jonathan Hirschi (France) Jean-Éric Vergne | Gibson GK428 4.2 L V8 | D | 183 | +14 Laps |
| 10 | LMP2 | 25 | (China) CEFC Manor TRS Racing | (Mexico) Roberto González (Switzerland) Simon Trummer (Russia) Vitaly Petrov | Oreca 07 | D | 182 | +15 Laps |
| 10 | LMP2 | 25 | (China) CEFC Manor TRS Racing | (Mexico) Roberto González (Switzerland) Simon Trummer (Russia) Vitaly Petrov | Gibson GK428 4.2 L V8 | D | 182 | +15 Laps |
| 11 | LMP2 | 37 | (China) Jackie Chan DC Racing | (United States) David Cheng (United Kingdom) Alex Brundle (France) Tristan Gommendy | Oreca 07 | D | 182 | +15 Laps |
| 11 | LMP2 | 37 | (China) Jackie Chan DC Racing | (United States) David Cheng (United Kingdom) Alex Brundle (France) Tristan Gommendy | Gibson GK428 4.2 L V8 | D | 182 | +15 Laps |
| 12 | LMP2 | 13 | (Switzerland) Vaillante Rebellion | (Switzerland) Mathias Beche (Denmark) David Heinemeier Hansson (Brazil) Nelson Piquet Jr. | Oreca 07 | D | 172 | +25 Laps |
| 12 | LMP2 | 13 | (Switzerland) Vaillante Rebellion | (Switzerland) Mathias Beche (Denmark) David Heinemeier Hansson (Brazil) Nelson Piquet Jr. | Gibson GK428 4.2 L V8 | D | 172 | +25 Laps |
| 13 | **LMGTE; Pro** | **67** | **(United States) Ford Chip Ganassi Team UK** | **(United Kingdom) Andy Priaulx (United Kingdom) Harry Tincknell (Brazil) Pipo Derani** | **Ford GT** | MI | **171** | **+26 Laps** |
| 13 | **LMGTE; Pro** | **67** | **(United States) Ford Chip Ganassi Team UK** | **(United Kingdom) Andy Priaulx (United Kingdom) Harry Tincknell (Brazil) Pipo Derani** | **Ford EcoBoost 3.5 L Turbo V6** | MI | **171** | **+26 Laps** |
| 14 | LMGTE; Pro | 51 | (Italy) AF Corse | (United Kingdom) James Calado (Italy) Alessandro Pier Guidi | Ferrari 488 GTE | MI | 171 | +26 Laps |
| 14 | LMGTE; Pro | 51 | (Italy) AF Corse | (United Kingdom) James Calado (Italy) Alessandro Pier Guidi | Ferrari F154CB 3.9 L Turbo V8 | MI | 171 | +26 Laps |
| 15 | LMGTE; Pro | 91 | (Germany) Porsche GT Team | (Austria) Richard Lietz (France) Frédéric Makowiecki | Porsche 911 RSR | MI | 171 | +26 Laps |
| 15 | LMGTE; Pro | 91 | (Germany) Porsche GT Team | (Austria) Richard Lietz (France) Frédéric Makowiecki | Porsche 4.0 L Flat-6 | MI | 171 | +26 Laps |
| 16 | LMGTE; Pro | 66 | (United States) Ford Chip Ganassi Team UK | (Germany) Stefan Mücke (France) Olivier Pla (United States) Billy Johnson | Ford GT | MI | 171 | +26 Laps |
| 16 | LMGTE; Pro | 66 | (United States) Ford Chip Ganassi Team UK | (Germany) Stefan Mücke (France) Olivier Pla (United States) Billy Johnson | Ford EcoBoost 3.5 L Turbo V6 | MI | 171 | +26 Laps |
| 17 | LMGTE; Pro | 71 | (Italy) AF Corse | (Italy) Davide Rigon (United Kingdom) Sam Bird | Ferrari 488 GTE | MI | 170 | +27 Laps |
| 17 | LMGTE; Pro | 71 | (Italy) AF Corse | (Italy) Davide Rigon (United Kingdom) Sam Bird | Ferrari F154CB 3.9 L Turbo V8 | MI | 170 | +27 Laps |
| 18 | LMGTE; Pro | 95 | (United Kingdom) Aston Martin Racing | (Denmark) Nicki Thiim (Denmark) Marco Sørensen (New Zealand) Richie Stanaway | Aston Martin Vantage GTE | D | 170 | +27 Laps |
| 18 | LMGTE; Pro | 95 | (United Kingdom) Aston Martin Racing | (Denmark) Nicki Thiim (Denmark) Marco Sørensen (New Zealand) Richie Stanaway | Aston Martin 4.5 L V8 | D | 170 | +27 Laps |
| 19 | LMGTE; Pro | 97 | (United Kingdom) Aston Martin Racing | (United Kingdom) Darren Turner (United Kingdom) Jonathan Adam (Brazil) Daniel Serra | Aston Martin Vantage GTE | D | 168 | +29 Laps |
| 19 | LMGTE; Pro | 97 | (United Kingdom) Aston Martin Racing | (United Kingdom) Darren Turner (United Kingdom) Jonathan Adam (Brazil) Daniel Serra | Aston Martin 4.5 L V8 | D | 168 | +29 Laps |
| 20 | **LMGTE; Am** | **61** | **(Singapore) Clearwater Racing** | **(Singapore) Weng Sun Mok (Japan) Keita Sawa (Republic of Ireland) Matt Griffin** | **Ferrari 488 GTE** | MI | **166** | **+31 Laps** |
| 20 | **LMGTE; Am** | **61** | **(Singapore) Clearwater Racing** | **(Singapore) Weng Sun Mok (Japan) Keita Sawa (Republic of Ireland) Matt Griffin** | **Ferrari F154CB 3.9 L Turbo V8** | MI | **166** | **+31 Laps** |
| 21 | LMGTE; Am | 98 | (United Kingdom) Aston Martin Racing | (Canada) Paul Dalla Lana (Portugal) Pedro Lamy (Austria) Mathias Lauda | Aston Martin Vantage GTE | D | 166 | +31 Laps |
| 21 | LMGTE; Am | 98 | (United Kingdom) Aston Martin Racing | (Canada) Paul Dalla Lana (Portugal) Pedro Lamy (Austria) Mathias Lauda | Aston Martin 4.5 L V8 | D | 166 | +31 Laps |
| 22 | LMGTE; Am | 77 | (Germany) Dempsey-Proton Racing | (Germany) Christian Ried (Italy) Matteo Cairoli (Germany) Marvin Dienst | Porsche 911 RSR | D | 166 | +31 Laps |
| 22 | LMGTE; Am | 77 | (Germany) Dempsey-Proton Racing | (Germany) Christian Ried (Italy) Matteo Cairoli (Germany) Marvin Dienst | Porsche 4.0 L Flat-6 | D | 166 | +31 Laps |
| 23 | LMP1 | 7 | (Japan) Toyota Gazoo Racing | (United Kingdom) Mike Conway (Japan) Kamui Kobayashi (Argentina) José María López | Toyota TS050 Hybrid | MI | 159 | +38 Laps |
| 23 | LMP1 | 7 | (Japan) Toyota Gazoo Racing | (United Kingdom) Mike Conway (Japan) Kamui Kobayashi (Argentina) José María López | Toyota 2.4 L Turbo V6 | MI | 159 | +38 Laps |
| 24 | LMGTE; Am | 86 | (United Kingdom) Gulf Racing | (United Kingdom) Michael Wainwright (United Kingdom) Ben Barker (Australia) Nick Foster | Porsche 911 RSR | D | 143 | +54 Laps |
| 24 | LMGTE; Am | 86 | (United Kingdom) Gulf Racing | (United Kingdom) Michael Wainwright (United Kingdom) Ben Barker (Australia) Nick Foster | Porsche 4.0 L Flat-6 | D | 143 | +54 Laps |
| DNF | LMGTE; Am | 54 | (Switzerland) Spirit of Race | (Switzerland) Thomas Flohr (Italy) Francesco Castellacci (Spain) Miguel Molina | Ferrari 488 GTE | MI | 165 | Spun |
| DNF | LMGTE; Am | 54 | (Switzerland) Spirit of Race | (Switzerland) Thomas Flohr (Italy) Francesco Castellacci (Spain) Miguel Molina | Ferrari F154CB 3.9 L Turbo V8 | MI | 165 | Spun |
| DNF | LMP1 | 4 | (Austria) ByKolles Racing Team | (United Kingdom) Oliver Webb (Austria) Dominik Kraihamer (United Kingdom) James Rossiter | ENSO CLM P1/01 | MI | 155 | Collision |
| DNF | LMP1 | 4 | (Austria) ByKolles Racing Team | (United Kingdom) Oliver Webb (Austria) Dominik Kraihamer (United Kingdom) James Rossiter | Nismo VRX30A 3.0 L Turbo V6 | MI | 155 | Collision |
| DNF | LMGTE; Pro | 92 | (Germany) Porsche GT Team | (Denmark) Michael Christensen (France) Kévin Estre | Porsche 911 RSR | MI | 95 | Fire |
| DNF | LMGTE; Pro | 92 | (Germany) Porsche GT Team | (Denmark) Michael Christensen (France) Kévin Estre | Porsche 4.0 L Flat-6 | MI | 95 | Fire |

== Standings after the race ==
2017 LMP FIA World Endurance Drivers Championship standings

| Pos. | +/– | Driver | Points |
|---|---|---|---|
| 1 | | (United Kingdom) Anthony Davidson (Japan) Kazuki Nakajima (Switzerland) Sébastien Buemi | 25 |
| 2 | | (New Zealand) Brendon Hartley (New Zealand) Earl Bamber (Germany) Timo Bernhard | 18 |
| 3 | | (Germany) André Lotterer (Switzerland) Neel Jani (United Kingdom) Nick Tandy | 15 |
| 4 | | (Netherlands) Ho-Pin Tung (United Kingdom) Oliver Jarvis (France) Thomas Laurent | 12 |
| 5 | | (Brazil) Bruno Senna (France) Julien Canal (France) Nicolas Prost | 10 |

2017 LMP1 FIA World Endurance Manufacturers Championship standings

| Pos. | +/– | Constructor | Points |
|---|---|---|---|
| 1 | | (Germany) Porsche | 33 |
| 2 | | (Japan) Toyota | 26.5 |

- Note: Only the top five positions are included for the Drivers' Championship standings.

2017 GT FIA World Endurance Drivers Championship standings

| Pos. | +/– | Driver | Points |
|---|---|---|---|
| 1 | | (United Kingdom) Andy Priaulx (United Kingdom) Harry Tincknell (Brazil) Pipo Derani | 26 |
| 2 | | (Italy) Alessandro Pier Guidi (United Kingdom) James Calado | 18 |
| 3 | | (France) Frédéric Makowiecki (Austria) Richard Lietz | 15 |
| 4 | | (United States) Billy Johnson (France) Olivier Pla (Germany) Stefan Mücke | 12 |
| 5 | | (Italy) Davide Rigon (United Kingdom) Sam Bird | 10 |

2017 GT FIA World Endurance Manufacturers Championship standings

| Pos. | +/– | Constructor | Points |
|---|---|---|---|
| 1 | | (United States) Ford | 38 |
| 2 | | (Italy) Ferrari | 28 |
| 3 | | (Germany) Porsche | 16 |
| 4 | | (United Kingdom) Aston Martin | 14 |

- Note: Only the top five positions are included for the Drivers' Championship standings.
