= Porsche 919 Hybrid =

Le Mans Prototype 1 racing car by Porsche

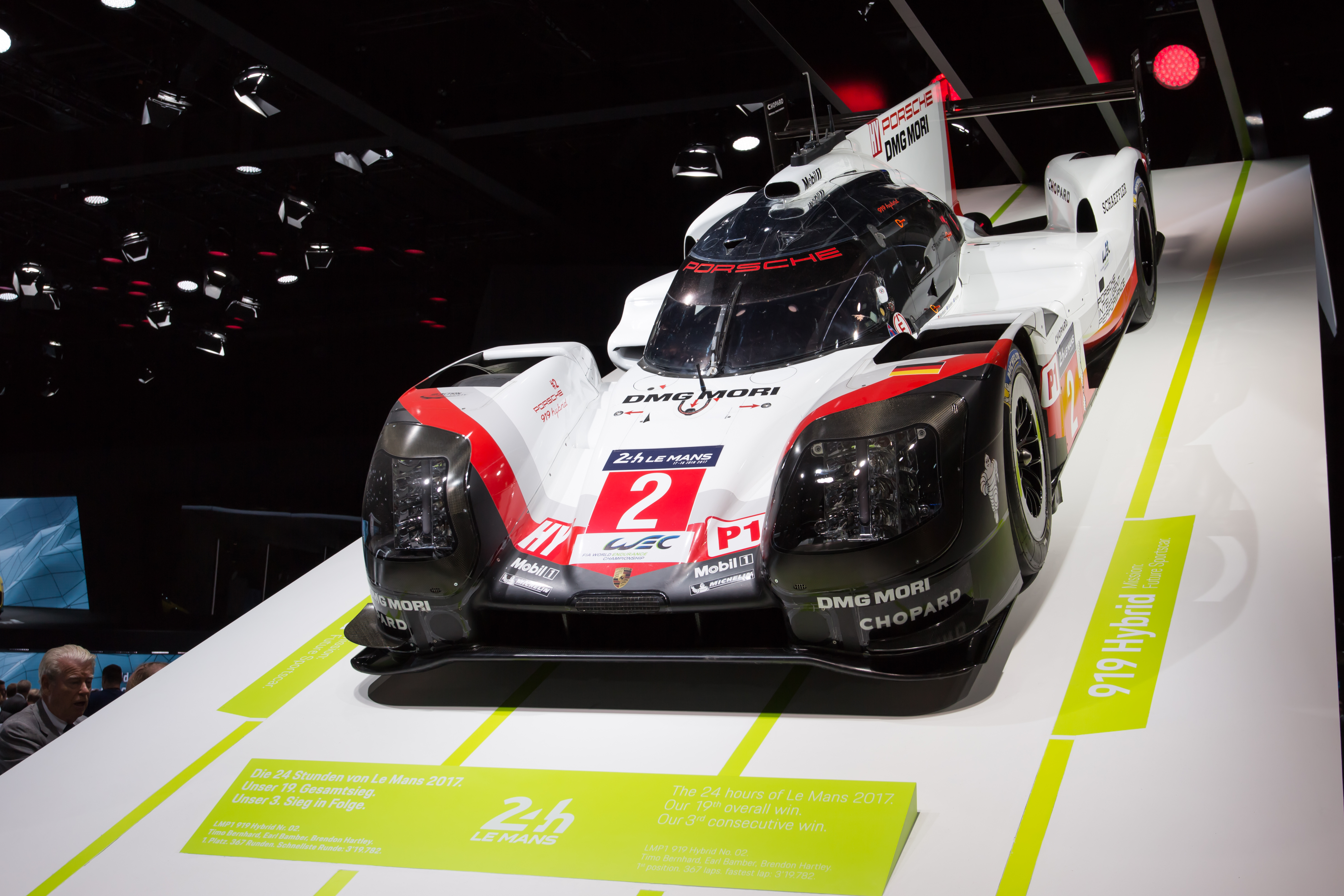
- The Porsche 919 Hybrid at the IAA 2017
- Category: LMP1-H
- Constructor: Porsche AG
- Designer: Alex Hitzinger (Technical Director)
- Predecessor: Porsche RS Spyder (LMP2)
- Successor: Porsche 963 (LMDh)

Technical specifications
- Chassis: Composite of carbon fibre with honeycomb aluminium core
- Suspension (front): Independent multi-link pushrod configuration with adjustable shock absorbers
- Suspension (rear): Same as front
- Length: 4,650 mm (183 in)
- Width: 1,900 mm (75 in)
- Height: 1,050 mm (41 in)
- Engine: Porsche 9R9 2.0 L (122 cu in) direct-injected turbocharged V4 engine mid-mounted longitudinal configuration with 4WD system
- Transmission: Porsche 7-speed electro-hydraulic actuated sequential gearbox with rear-lock differential
- Battery: Lithium-ion battery for energy recovery
- Power: 2014–2017 Spec: 373 kW (500 hp; 507 PS) (ICE) + 300 kW (402 hp; 408 PS) (electric motors); 671 kW (900 hp) (combined) Evo Spec: 530 kW (711 hp; 721 PS) (ICE) + 324 kW (434 hp; 441 PS) (electric motors); 854 kW (1,145 hp) (combined)
- Weight: 2014–2017 Spec: 875 kg (1,929 lb); (before driver or fuel) Evo Spec: 849 kg (1,872 lb); (before driver or fuel)
- Fuel: Shell V-Power 80% unleaded Petrol + Ethanol E20
- Lubricants: Mobil 1
- Tyres: Michelin Radial 310/710-18, front and rear

Competition history
- Notable entrants: (Germany) Porsche Team, (Germany) Porsche LMP Team
- Notable drivers: (New Zealand) Earl Bamber; (Germany) Timo Bernhard; (France) Romain Dumas; (New Zealand) Brendon Hartley; (Germany) Nico Hülkenberg; (Switzerland) Neel Jani; (Germany) Marc Lieb; (Australia) Mark Webber; (United Kingdom) Nick Tandy; (Germany) André Lotterer
- Debut: 2014 6 Hours of Silverstone
- First win: 2014 6 Hours of São Paulo
- Last win: 2017 6 Hours of Circuit of the Americas
- Last event: 2017 6 Hours of Bahrain
Races	Wins	Podiums	Poles	F/Laps
34	17	43	20	4
- Constructors' Championships: 3 (2015 FIA WEC, 2016 FIA WEC, 2017 FIA WEC)
- Drivers' Championships: 3 (2015 FIA WEC, 2016 FIA WEC, 2017 FIA WEC)

The Porsche 919 Hybrid is a Le Mans Prototype 1 (LMP1) dual hybrid racing car built and used by Porsche in the 2014, 2015, 2016 and 2017 seasons of the FIA World Endurance Championship. It has a two-litre (120 cu in) 90-degree V4 mid-mounted mono-turbocharged petrol engine that produces 500 hp (370 kW) and acts as a chassis load-bearing member – and two separate energy-recovery hybrid systems to recover thermal energy from exhaust gases and convert kinetic energy into electrical energy under braking for storage into lithium-ion battery packs. In accordance with the 2014 regulations, the vehicle was placed in the 6 MJ (1.7 kWh) class.

On 4 March 2014, the 919 Hybrid was shown to the press for the first time during the Geneva Motor Show. Porsche supplied two cars, driven by six drivers, for the season. Romain Dumas, Neel Jani, and Marc Lieb won three pole positions and the season-ending 6 Hours of São Paulo as Timo Bernhard, Brendon Hartley and Mark Webber helped the team to finish third in the World Manufacturers' Championship. In 2015, the car was further developed and was categorized into the 8 MJ (2.2 kWh) category. Bernhard, Hartley, and Webber won four out of eight races to claim the 2015 World Endurance Drivers' Championship and the World Manufacturers' Championship. Earl Bamber, Nico Hülkenberg and Nick Tandy won the 6 Hours of Spa-Francorchamps and 24 Hours of Le Mans, driving a third 919 Hybrid.

In 2016 Dumas, Jani, and Lieb won the 6 Hours of Silverstone and the 24 Hours of Le Mans with the car after further development. Consistent performances from the trio won them the 2016 World Endurance Drivers' Championship and the team's second. Although Bernhard, Hartley, and Webber had reliability issues in the season's first three races, the trio won four of the six remaining rounds to help Porsche win its second consecutive World Manufacturers' Championship. The next year, 2017, Tandy and former Audi LMP1 driver André Lotterer joined Jani in place of Dumas and Lieb, and Bamber teamed up with Bernhard and Hartley, replacing the retired Webber. Porsche finished on the podium in the first two rounds. Bamber, Bernhard, and Hartley recovered from a 13-lap deficit to win the 24 Hours of Le Mans and three more races for Porsche's third consecutive World Drivers' and Manufacturers' Championships at the season's penultimate round, the 2017 6 Hours of Shanghai. After 2017, the 919 Hybrid project was discontinued as Porsche entered Formula E. An evolution of the car, called the 919 Evo, was demonstrated in 2018, setting multiple lap records as the overall lap record for the notorious Nordschleife.

== Development ==
=== Concept ===
In mid-May 2011, Porsche decided to compete as a works team in the Le Mans Prototype 1 (LMP1) category for the FIA World Endurance Championship, which began in 2012. Two months later, Porsche publicly announced the plans and stated that the car would debut in 2014. Around this time, the Porsche Motorsport Centre Flacht in Weissach expanded to 200 full-time employees working on the project's design, assembly and deployment. In late 2011, Porsche employed Fritz Enzinger from fellow German marque BMW to serve as the vice-president of LMP1. Enzinger oversaw the organisation of the vehicle's construction. At the end of the year, Porsche employed Alex Hitzinger—former Head of F1 Development for engine builder Cosworth and later Red Bull Racing's Head of Advanced Technologies—to oversee the car's technical design.

The car was named the 919 Hybrid to acknowledge Porsche's embarkation into hybrid car technology and honour its tradition of having similarly named vehicles compete at the 24 Hours of Le Mans. It was Porsche's first sports car prototype built since the RS Spyder debuted in 2005, the first prototype Porsche constructed to compete in the top category of sports car racing since the 1998 Porsche 911 GT1-98 and Porsche LMP1-98 and the first sports car prototype to be raced by Porsche as a factory operation since the Porsche 911 GT1-98 and Porsche LMP1-98. A total of nine chassis were built.

=== Design ===
At the end of 2012, the monocoque was finalised to comply with a request from Porsche, which wanted it to be ready for testing in June 2013. It was designed for maximum efficiency while meeting the 2014 LMP1 regulations on driver visibility with a raised cockpit. The car's developers were inexperienced in the LMP1 category, but they drew upon the 911 GT3 R Hybrid and the 918 Spyder hybrid-powered sports car. The 2014 LMP1 regulations mandated that the car be no longer than 4,650 mm (183 in), be around 1,800 mm (71 in) to 1,900 mm (75 in) wide and 1,050 mm (41 in) tall. Aerodynamic fine-tuning of the carbon fibre with honeycomb aluminum core chassis began in February 2012, with 2,000 hours spent in wind tunnels at Porsche's Weissach facilities and the University of Stuttgart. It combined the car's low weight with a high amount of torsional rigidity and safety, allowing for the foundation of a precise wheel location via its independent multi-link suspension with pushrods and adjustable shock absorbers to exploit its 360 mm (14 in) Michelin tyres. The regulations reduced the car's maximum weight to 870 kg (1,920 lb).

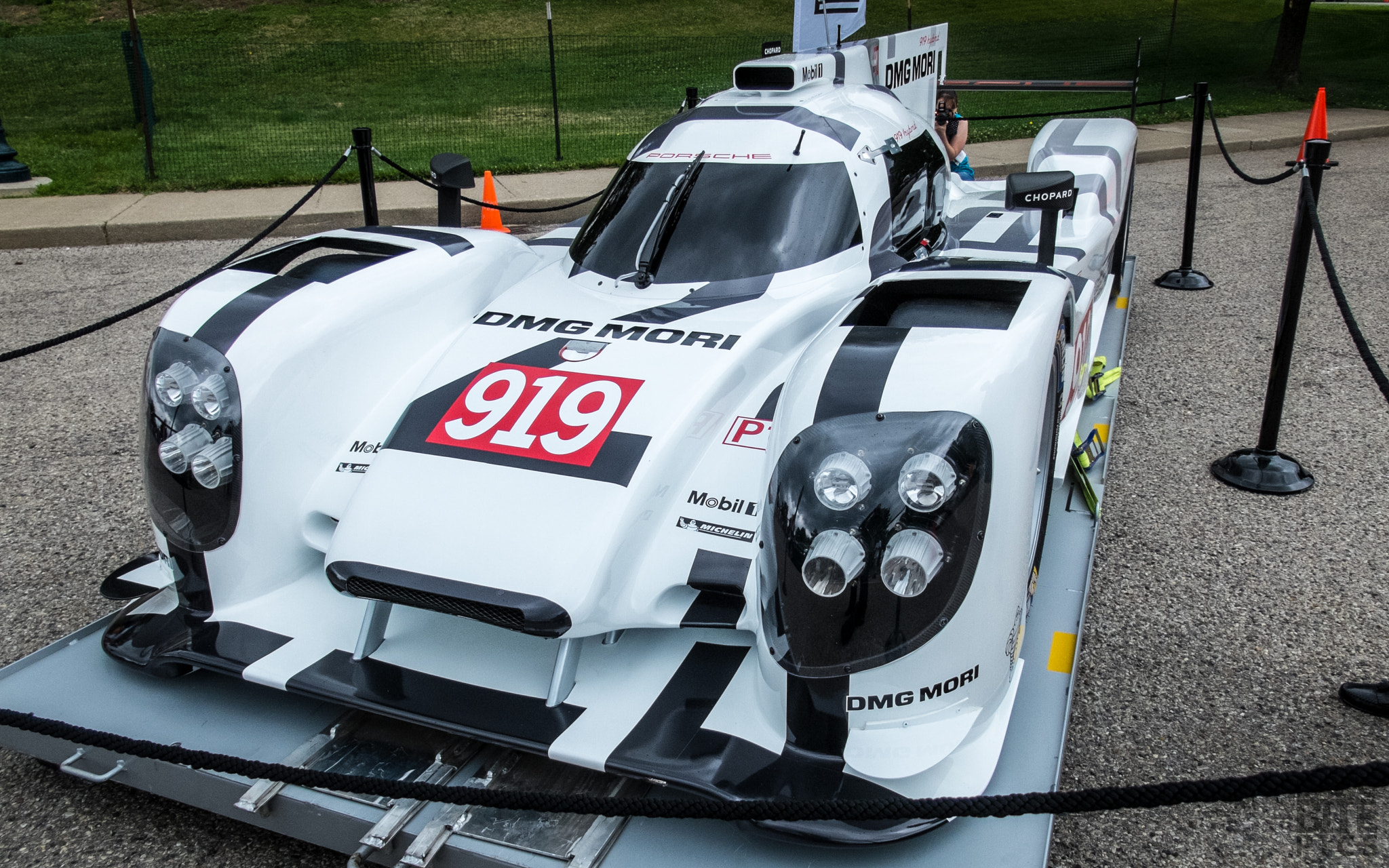
The front view of the Porsche 919 Hybrid on display at the 2014 Concours d'Elegance

The compact and lightweight engine was a two-litre (120 cu in) 90-degree V4 cylinder bank mid-mounted mono-turbocharged petrol engine. It ran at 9,000 rpm, with performance coming from a direct fuel-injection system and a single Garrett-designed turbocharger with a dual overhead camshaft. It produced approximately 500 hp (370 kW) and acted as a chassis load-bearing member. Due to the small size of the engine, the transmission casing was fitted to the rear suspension and was almost a third of the car's length. Engine cooling was achieved through a carbon-fibre-and-gold thermal airbox in its centre. Front airflow was enabled by louvres along its flank, and a single curved roll-hoop intake was mounted on its roof to allow air cooling. The car had traction control and a hydraulically operated paddle-shift seven-speed sequential gearbox with rear-lock differential mounted inside a carbon-fibre casing with titanium inserts around its high-stress sections. The brake discs were made from internally ventilated light-alloy carbon ceramic materials, and the car has power steering. For night driving, Porsche designed two four-point LED headlights at both sides of the vehicle for better visibility.

The 919 Hybrid had two separate energy-recovery hybrid systems. The rear exhaust system used a two-turbine electric generator to recover thermal energy from exhaust gasses, which exited from an off-central outlet on one side of the engine cover's dorsal fin. The front system utilised a 185 kW (248 hp) motor–generator (MGU) on the front axle; during braking, kinetic energy was converted into electrical energy, which was stored in water-cooled A123 Systems lithium-ion battery packs installed on the passenger side, and eliminating turbo lag. Under acceleration the motor-generator operates as an electric motor to run the front wheels via a differential while the petrol engine drives the rear wheels. This temporarily made the car four-wheel drive as the electric motor directed an extra 400 hp (300 kW) to the front wheels for a total of 1,000 hp (750 kW). The 2014 regulations divided the MGU hierarchy into 2 MJ (0.56 kWh) increments, from 2 to 8 MJ (0.56 to 2.22 kWh). Porsche chose the 6 MJ (1.7 kWh) category, allowing the 919 Hybrid to use 4.78 L (1.05 imp gal; 1.26 US gal) per lap at Le Mans, although Porsche designed it to operate in the 8 MJ (2.2 kWh) class due to incompatibility.

=== Preparation ===
In April 2013, Porsche named its first two drivers. Two-time co-champions of the American Le Mans Series Le Mans Prototype 2 (LMP2) class and 2010 24 Hours of Le Mans winners Timo Bernhard and Romain Dumas were chosen for their previous experience in Le Mans Prototype racing for Porsche. Two months later, Neel Jani was drafted from the Rebellion Racing team on a multi-year contract, and Red Bull Racing Formula One driver Mark Webber, whose last experience in sports car racing was the 1999 24 Hours of Le Mans for AMG-Mercedes, joined the team two days later. In December 2013, the programme's final two drivers were announced, with Mercedes-Benz Formula One test driver and Murphy Prototypes European Le Mans Series LMP2 competitor Brendon Hartley and long-time Grand Touring racer Marc Lieb completing the lineup.

Dumas shared the No. 14 car with Jani and Lieb while Bernhard was paired with Webber and Hartley in the No. 20 entry. According to Enzinger, Dumas and Bernhard were paired separately because Porsche wanted to create parity in terms of experience and driver weight within both crews. Enzinger said both drivers had "the most prototype experience of [the] drivers, so [they] decided to split them" and that they had "two newcomers to Porsche in Neel [Jani] and Brendon [Hartley] and decided to put one in each car. The other factor was weight. [They] looked at the weight of the drivers" and "tried to equalise that across the two cars ... to be absolutely fair to give both cars an equal chance."

=== Livery, testing and launch ===
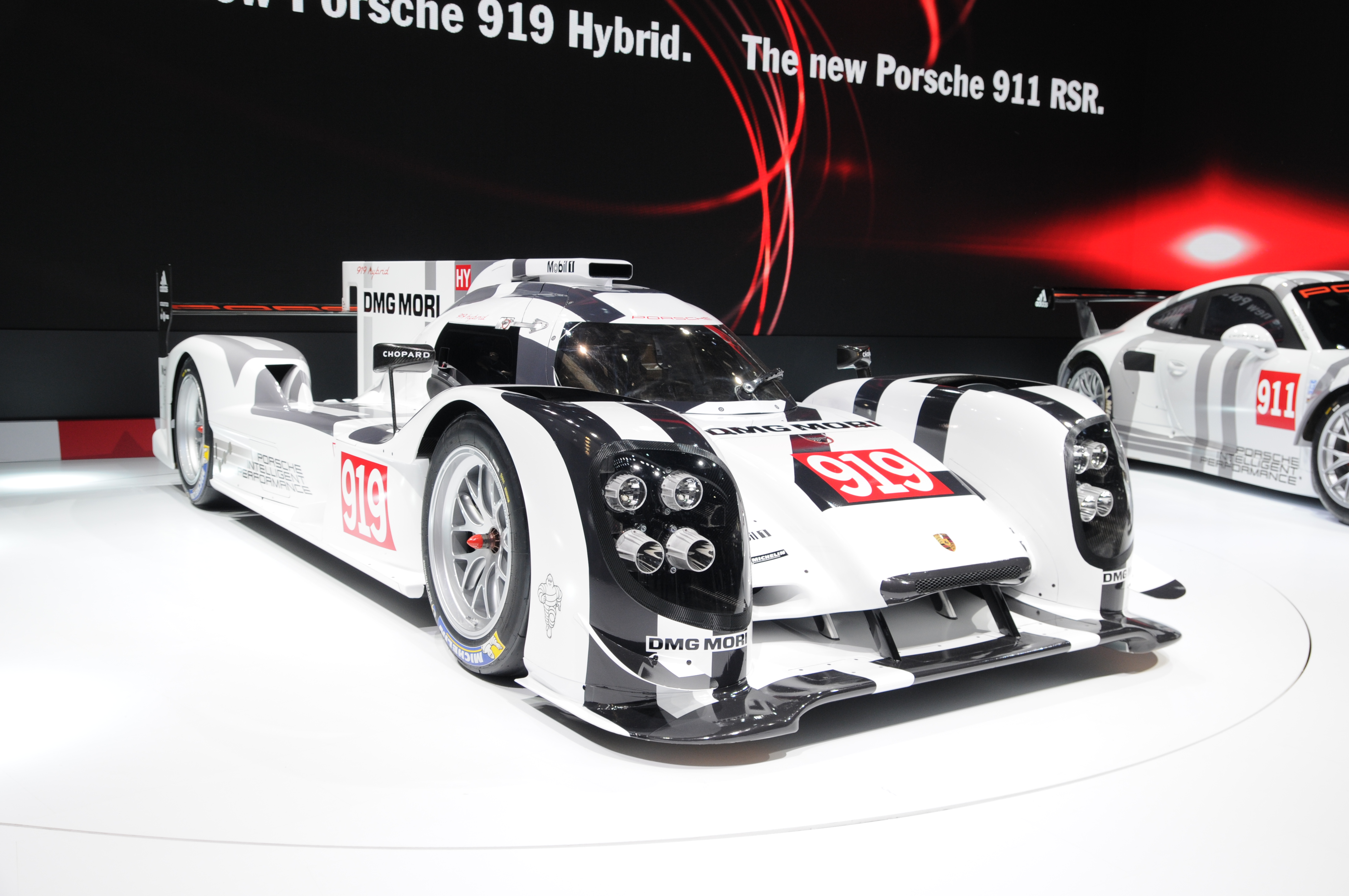
The Porsche 919 Hybrid at its official reveal at the 2014 Geneva Motor Show

The 919 Hybrid was liveried in white and incorporated the 'Porsche Intelligent Performance' slogan, with the first letters of each word emblazoned down the vehicle when viewed from the top. The rear wing was liveried in black with the word 'Porsche' in red letters. The team had no title sponsor, with few sponsor stickers adorning the car. Its race number was put in a red square in the middle of the top of its sidepods and near both fenders but below both door panels. On 12 June 2013, Bernhard drove the 919 Hybrid in a one-day private test session under a camouflage livery at Porsche's Weissach test track. Testing continued into September, with car development carried out at France's Circuit de Nevers Magny-Cours and Circuit Paul Ricard, Italy's Autodromo Nazionale Monza and Germany's EuroSpeedway Lausitz. Its 2013 schedule concluded at Portugal's Algarve International Circuit in December.

On 4 March 2014, the car was officially revealed at a press conference during the Geneva Motor Show. From 24 to 26 March, Porsche held its first two-car endurance tests at the Circuit Paul Ricard and fine-tuned the 919 Hybrid's setups with its drivers, covering a total of 4,756 km (2,955 mi) with multiple technical problems stopping both cars several times during the three-day session. The team stayed at the track for the official two-day pre-season test. During the Friday night session, Hartley set the fastest overall lap time of 1 minute, 41.289 seconds in a low-downforce setup.

== Subsequent alterations ==
=== 2015 version ===
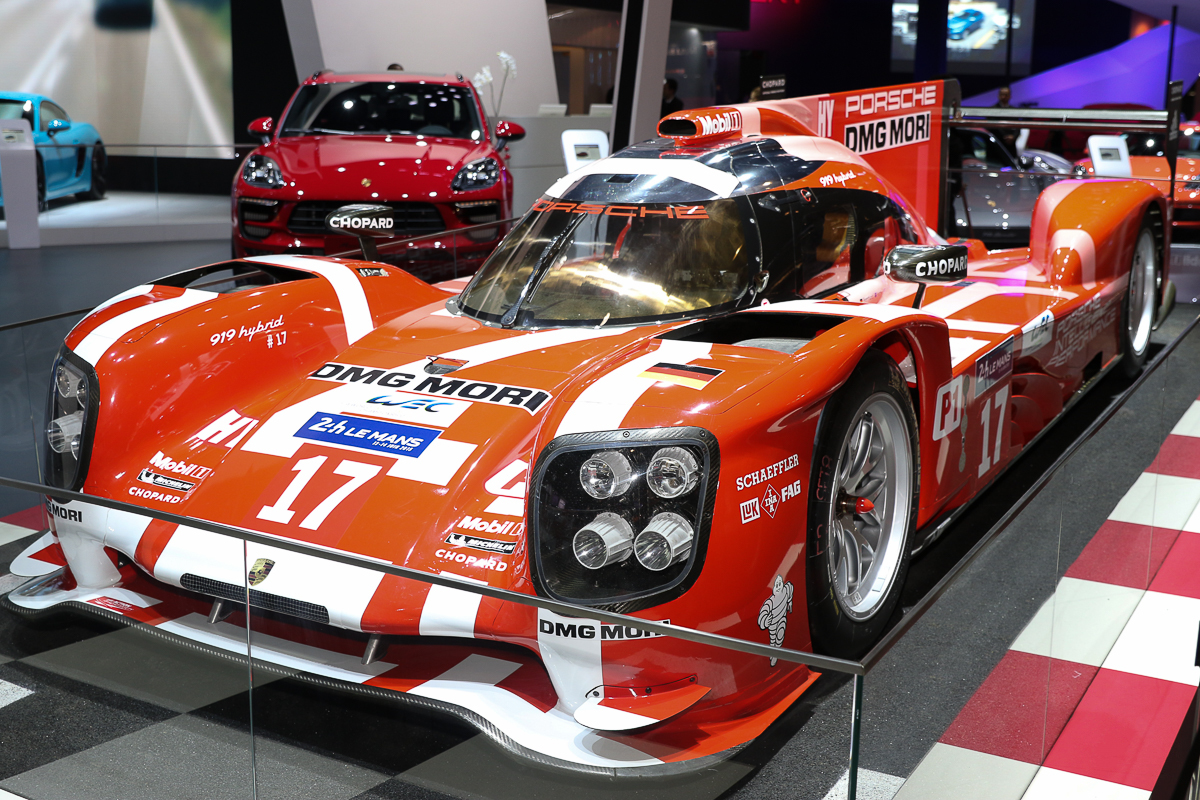
The red liveried No. 17 Porsche 919 Hybrid that was driven in the 2015 24 Hours of Le Mans

Porsche redesigned the 919 Hybrid for the 2015 season, carrying over the concept from 2014. It featured a new chassis with an identical layout, manufactured as one piece to save weight, dropping from 900 kg (2,000 lb) overall to 870 kg (1,920 lb). The car was categorised into the 8 MJ (2.2 kWh) class because of a lighter, refined and improved hybrid system increasing its maximum power to 294 hp (219 kW), following a decision made by Porsche around early March 2015. The car's nose-cone impact structure was lowered and narrowed, with its lead supported by the front bodywork's leading edge. Its curved louvres were replaced by two straight slats with a bulge on the rear floor. Porsche changed the car's centralised exhaust system to a twin exhaust-pipe layout arranged symmetrically to the axis for improved output and more efficient aerodynamics.

The 2015 car began private testing at Porsche's Weissach test track with Lieb in December 2014. Drivers further tested it at UAE's Yas Marina Circuit, the Bahrain International Circuit and Spain's Ciudad del Motor de Aragón from January to March. The first pictures of the car were published online on 16 January, and it was officially revealed to the press at Circuit Paul Ricard's official two-day pre-season test session on 26 March. Porsche used three liveries for the 24 Hours of Le Mans. The No. 17 car was adorned in red as a tribute to Porsche's first overall victory at Le Mans with the Porsche 917 in 1970. The No. 18 entry was liveried in black to showcase the close technical similarities between the 919 Hybrid and the 918 Spyder. The No. 19 vehicle was adorned in white, Germany and Porsche's national standard colour.

=== 2016 version ===
The carbon fibre sandwich chassis was retained for 2016, but many of the car's components were improved because of detailed performance enhancements and weight reduction. The wheel rim was redesigned to be deeper in an attempt to reduce drag. The mandatory air extractor, which cooled the top of the front wheel arches, had a turning vane on its inner edge. The car had new rear wing endplates with a small extension at its base as part of the car's bodywork. The 2016-specification 919 Hybrid had three distinct aerodynamic packages. They were used depending on the type of circuit, with two high-downforce configurations for the Silverstone Circuit and a low-downforce package for the Circuit de Spa-Francorchamps and Le Mans (developed in Williams Grand Prix Engineering's wind tunnel in Grove, England with full-scale testing in Germany).

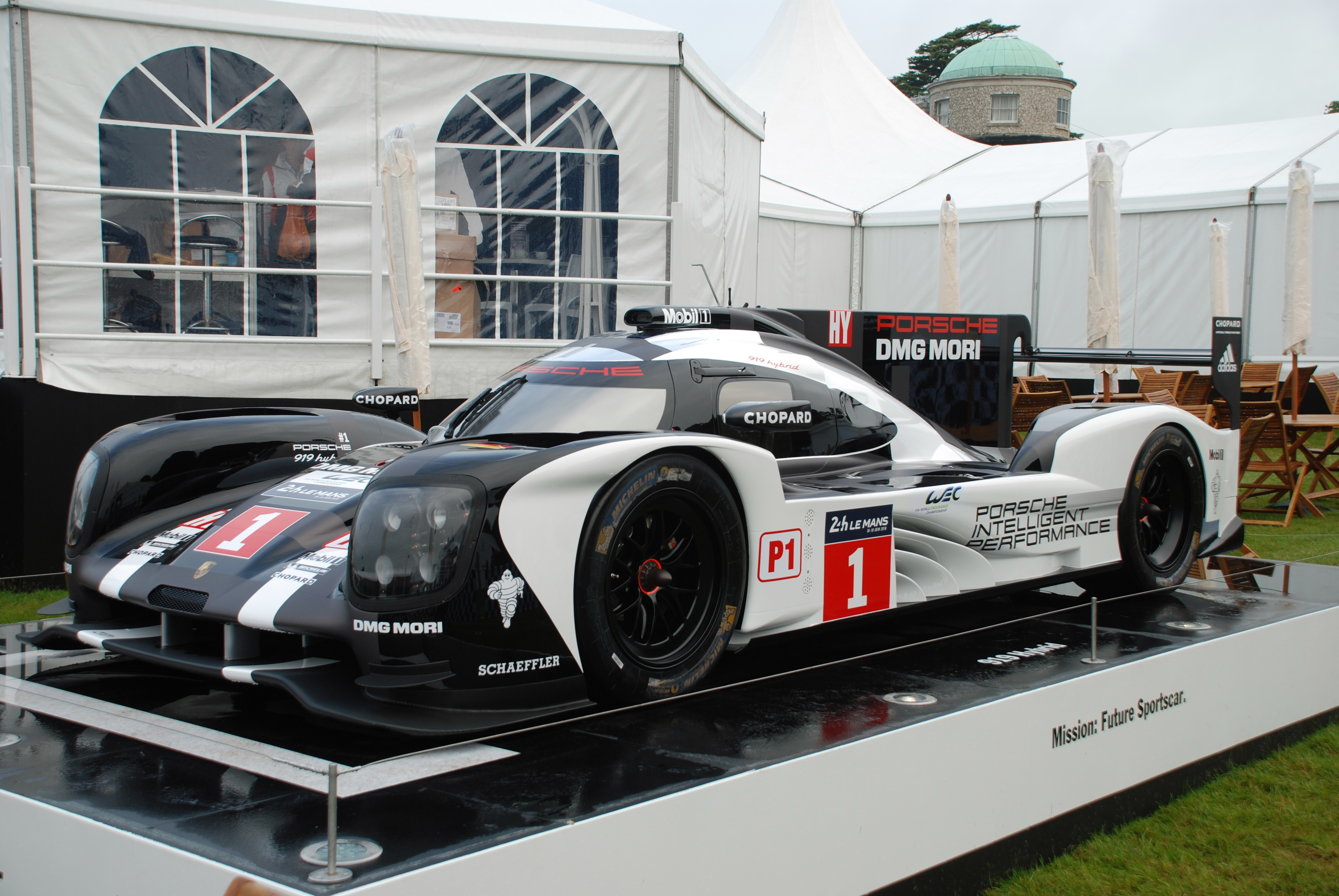
The No. 1 Porsche 919 Hybrid on display at the 2016 Goodwood Festival of Speed

Because of a new World Endurance Championship regulation that restricted the amount of available electrical energy and fuel by 8%, Porsche's engineers redesigned the engine to be lighter and produce around 480 to 495 hp (358 to 369 kW). Within the kinetic energy recovery system, the electric motor on the front axle, the power electronics and a new generation of lithium-ion battery cells in the in-house designed car battery were optimised to produce more horsepower. The power delivered by the front axle was more than 400 hp (300 kW) using an 800-volt battery, with a cumulative total of 900 hp (670 kW) from both the front and rear.

In mid-February 2016, Porsche held an eight-day tyre development test session at the Yas Marina Circuit, covering a total of 6,201 km (3,853 mi) between its six drivers. On 23 March, the car was officially revealed online, two days before the annual pre-season test session at Circuit Paul Ricard. The livery, which differed from that in the previous two years, was mostly black and white, with touches of red.

=== 2017 version ===
According to Porsche, it retained the monocoque from 2016, but from 60 to 70% of the 2017 car was new, with the largest alterations being to its aerodynamic demands. This included a major redesign of the front of the 919 Hybrid with wider arches for the front wheels to make it less aerodynamically sensitive from small bits of discarded rubber from the track surface. To the car's side, a new channel from the monocoque to the wheel arch was made visible, along with redesigned rearward air intakes for the radiators to cool the engine. New cost-cutting regulations mandated LMP1 teams to slow the cars and use just two aerodynamic packages for the season, restricting the amount of flexibility depending on the type of track. One aerodynamic alteration raised the front splitter to lower its cornering speeds and featured two strakes on its underside. Porsche elected for a low-downforce package that minimised air resistance at the 24 Hours of Le Mans and a second that compensated for an increased amount of drag and downforce for tighter circuits.

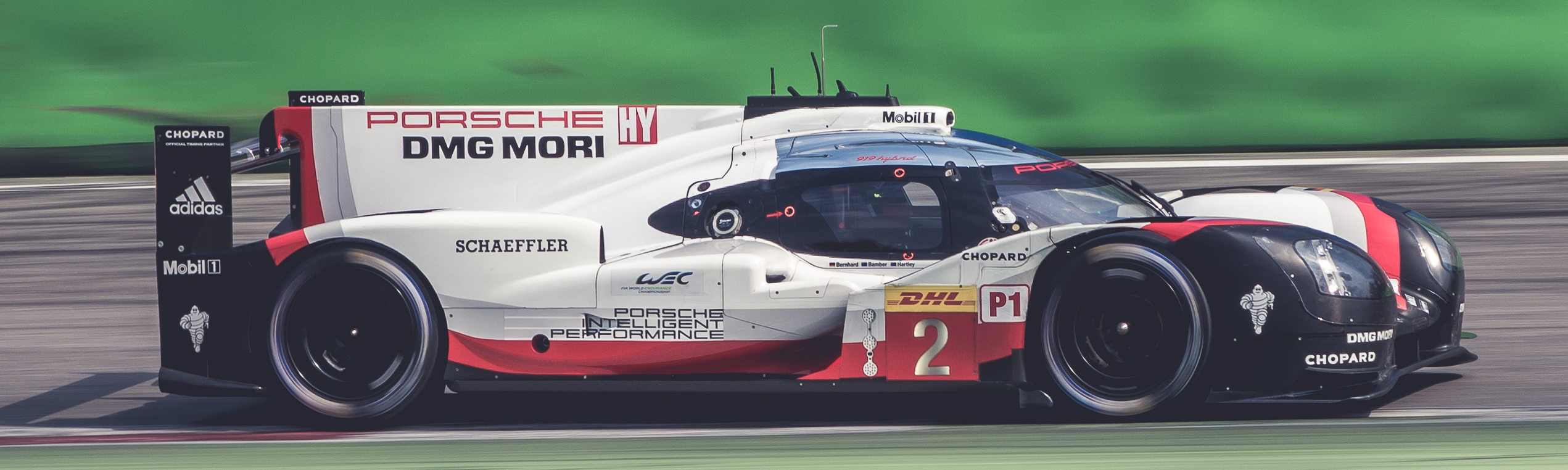
The 2017-specification Porsche 919 Hybrid being tested at the Autodromo Nazionale Monza

Porsche remained in the 8 MJ (2.2 kWh) MGU category for the 2017 season. The engine was modified to be lighter and more compact, and Porsche stated that it was its most-efficient ever. The power output was less than 500 hp (370 kW) and slightly more than 400 hp (300 kW) when the car's dual kinetic-energy recovery systems were active, for a total of 900 hp (670 kW). Approximately 60% of kinetic energy produced under braking was recovered by its front kinetic energy recovery system, and the remaining 40% was generated by the rear dual exhaust pipe system. Exhaust gases allowed the turbine to run at more than 120,000 rpm, operating a MGU that converted kinetic energy into electricity and stored it into the third-generation lithium-ion battery. The turbine was designed to run efficiently with variable geometry when there was low exhaust pressure at low speeds. The 919 Hybrid's livery was changed to white and black, with grey and red lines adorning its body.

In December 2016, testing of the car began at the Ciudad del Motor de Aragón for one week. Two months later, the team returned to the track for five days of further vehicle-development testing and endurance runs of 7,200 km (4,500 mi). The first spy photographs of the 2017 919 Hybrid testing at the Circuit Paul Ricard were published on 27 March 2017. Four days later, the car was officially revealed to the press. The two cars ran with its six drivers in the official two-day pre-season test session at the Autodromo Nazionale Monza.

=== 2018 – Porsche 919 Evo ===
Having retired from international competitions after the 2017 season, Porsche on 11 April 2018 revealed an evolution of the 919 Hybrid that was not intended for competition, and not limited by rules and reliability for endurance racing. Fuel flow restrictions were removed from the engine, allowing it to produce 720 PS (530 kW; 710 hp). The amount of recovered energy that could be used was increased from 6.37 MJ (1.77 kWh) to 8.49 MJ (2.36 kWh) for the Circuit de Spa-Francorchamps, and the output of the electric motors was increased from 400 to 440 PS (294 to 324 kW; 395 to 434 hp). By removing air conditioning, windscreen wipers, headlights and other electrical devices, the car's weight was reduced by 39 kg (86 lb); it weighed at 849 kg (1,872 lb) dry and 888 kg (1,958 lb) with driver ballast. Extensive aerodynamic upgrades to the 919 Evo increased downforce by 53% and increased aerodynamic efficiency by 66%, compared to the 919 Hybrid's 2017 6 Hours of Spa-Francorchamps qualifying specifications. These upgrades consist of the inclusion of an active drag-reduction system, an enlarged rear wing, a wider front diffuser and fixed-height side skirts.

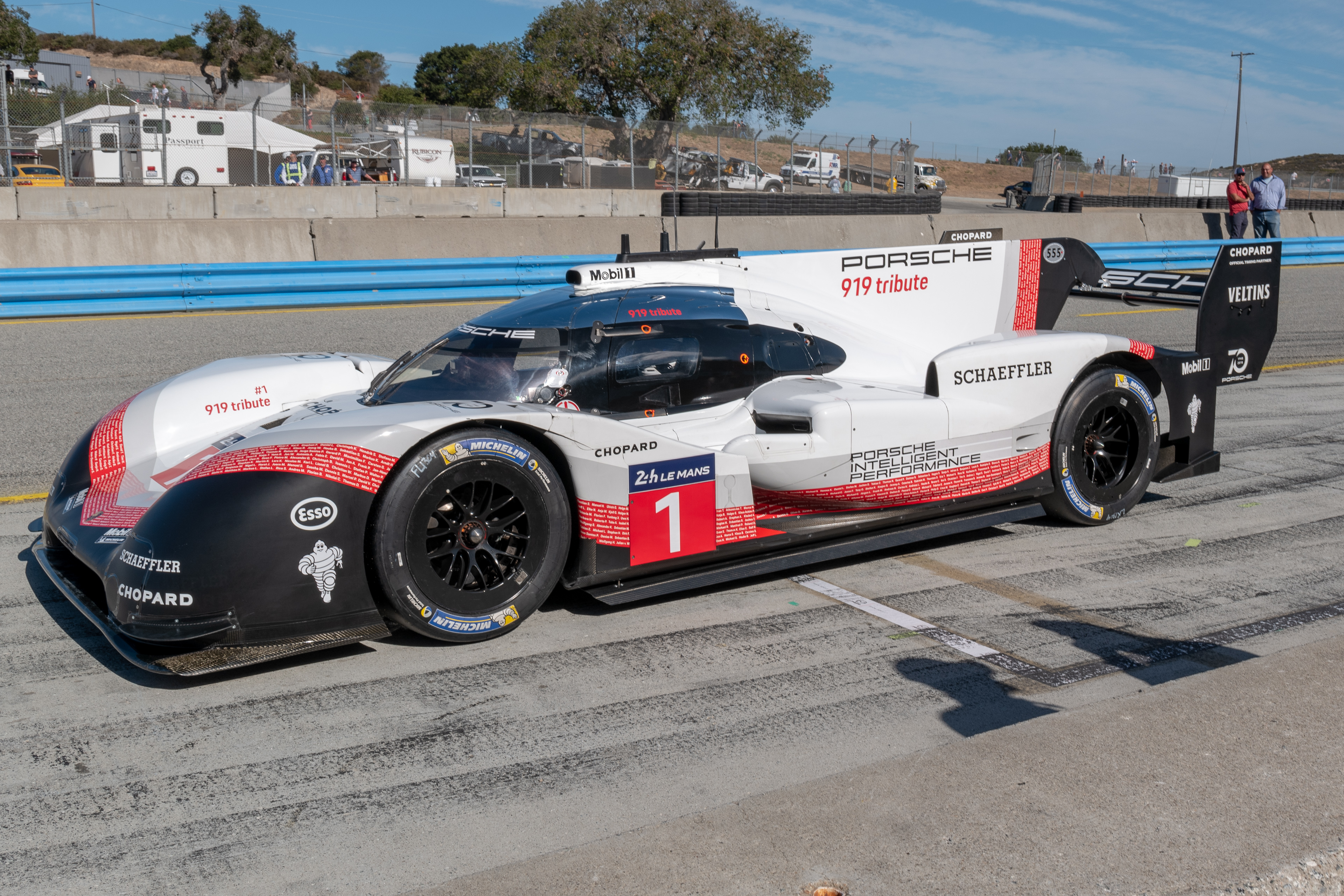
The No. 1 919 Evo during the Porsche Rennsport Reunion VI in 2018.

The Evo set what was then the fastest unofficial lap ever recorded at the Circuit de Spa-Francorchamps with a lap time of 1 minute, 41.77 seconds, with Neel Jani behind the wheel. Jani was more than 12 seconds faster than the standard 919 Hybrid's 2017 pole position lap of 1 minute, 54.097 seconds. During the lap, Jani recorded a speed trap at 359 km/h (223.1 mph) on the Kemmel Straight, with an average speed of 245.61 km/h (152.6 mph). This record has since been broken by Oscar Piastri in a McLaren MCL39, who set a 1:40.510 during sprint qualifying for the 2025 Belgian Grand Prix.

Throughout 2018, the 919 Evo was driven in demonstration runs as part of the "919 Tribute Tour" at the Nürburgring Nordschleife for the 2018 24 Hours of Nürburgring, at the Goodwood Festival of Speed in June, the Festival of Porsche at Brands Hatch and at WeatherTech Raceway Laguna Seca as part of Porsche Rennsport Reunion VI. On the 29th of June, Porsche ran the 919 Evo on the Nürburgring, and Timo Bernhard recorded a lap time of 5 minutes, 19.546 seconds, breaking the May 1983 record of 6 minutes, 11.13 seconds set by Stefan Bellof in a Porsche 956.

== Racing history ==
=== 2014 ===
At the season-opening 6 Hours of Silverstone, Dumas and Jani's No. 14 car started from third while Webber and Bernhard's No. 20 car was sixth. In the opening laps of the race, a problem with the front left wheel bearing forced Jani to the garage before retiring with an unrelated hydraulic problem after 30 laps. Bernhard passed Alexander Wurz's No. 7 Toyota TS040 Hybrid for second place at the beginning of the second hour on lap 53, but the No. 20 car slowed after it began raining because of its low-downforce package, ultimately finishing the weather-shortened race in third. Two weeks later, Jani and Lieb took the car's first pole position in changeable weather in the qualifying's final seconds at the 6 Hours of Spa-Francorchamps while Bernhard and Hartley began from fifth place. The No. 14 car led the first two hours until Sébastien Buemi's No. 8 Toyota passed it. An electrical fault disabled the No. 14's hybrid system and losing the car two laps, falling to 23rd overall with a subsequent rear damper problem and two front driveshaft faults.

In the trio of qualifying sessions held to determine the grid for the 24 Hours of Le Mans, Hartley's No. 20 vehicle set the first session's fastest lap, but the car fell to fourth the next day despite Bernhard improving its lap time in the second session. Jani's No. 14 car was second after the first session, maintaining it through the remaining two sessions as Dumas twice bettered its lap. The No. 20 entry failed to finish enough laps for classification due to a broken anti-roll bar, and fuel pressure and gearbox problems left the No. 14 car in eleventh overall. For the 6 Hours of Circuit of the Americas, Jani and Dumas qualified the No. 14 car second despite a transgression of energy recovery system limits nullifying one of Jani's laps; Hartley and Webber's No. 20 entry took third. In a race that was red flagged for 77 minutes because of a thunderstorm flooding the Circuit of the Americas, Jani overtook the Toyota cars to lead at the restart, but a loss of engine power left the No. 14 car in fourth. Bernhard aquaplaned and beached the No. 20 car in a gravel trap, but he, Webber and Hartley finished fifth.

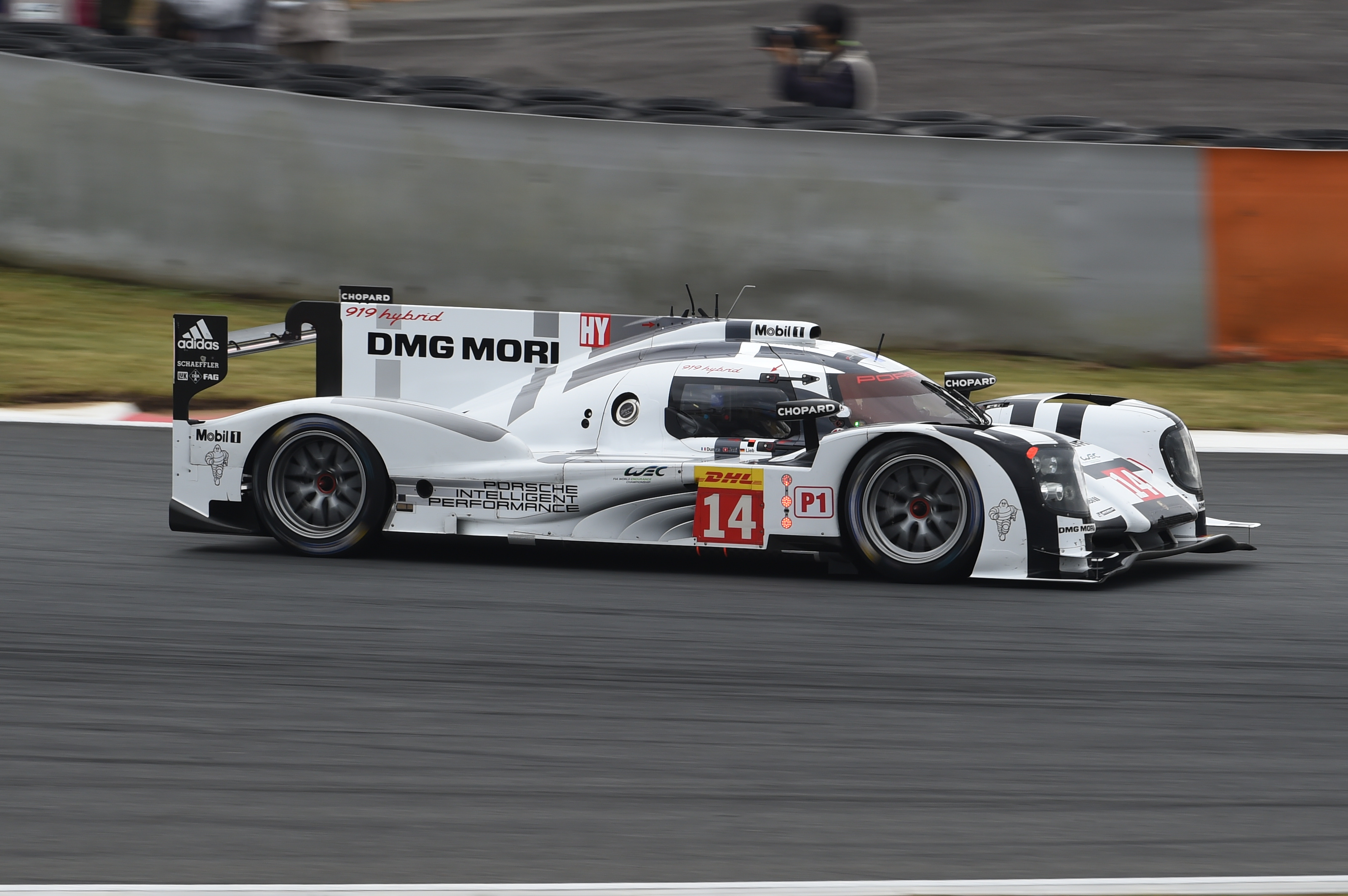
The No. 14 Porsche 919 Hybrid (pictured at the 2014 6 Hours of Fuji) took Porsche's first overall victory in endurance prototype motor racing since 1989 in São Paulo.

At the season's fifth race, the 6 Hours of Fuji, Webber and Bernard's No. 20 Porsche were beaten to the pole position by Buemi and Anthony Davidson's No. 8 Toyota with less than two minutes left in qualifying; the No. 14 entry of Jani and Lieb took third. Webber and the two Toyota cars duelled until a pit stop to replace a slow puncture lost him time by double stinting his tyres. He led twelve laps, and Porsche took its second podium of 2014 by finishing the No. 20 car third after power issues. The sister No. 14 car was a further lap adrift in fourth. Three weeks later at the 6 Hours of Shanghai, Jani and Dumas qualified with an identical two-lap average to Buemi and Davidson's No. 8 Toyota; the pole position was awarded to the former because they set their times first. Webber and Hartley's No. 14 car was 0.024 seconds slower in third. Dumas led until his teammate Hartley passed him on the 22nd lap. After the No. 20 Porsche's first pit stop in the second hour, Hartley sustained a puncture and fell to sixth. Jani's No. 14 car contested Tom Kristensen's No. 1 Audi R18 e-tron quattro for third, winning the battle with assistance from Webber to claim Porsche's third podium of 2014.

Jani and Dumas took Porsche's third pole position of the season and their second in a row at the 6 Hours of Bahrain while Bernhard and Hartley were 1.046 seconds slower in third. Dumas exchanged the lead and matched Toyota's pace to secure its first double podium, with the No. 14 car second and the sister No. 20 vehicle third despite brake temperature problems. At the season-closing 6 Hours of São Paulo, Webber and Bernhard took the No. 20 vehicle's first pole position of 2014; Jani and Lieb were 0.107 seconds slower in second. Webber and later his teammate Lieb led the first quarter until a battle developed between Porsche, Toyota and Audi mid-race. Although the car deviated from the normal pit stop sequence due to a puncture, Jani advanced the No. 14 Porsche to first. He led Davidson by 14 seconds until a major collision involving Webber and Matteo Cressoni's No. 90 8 Star Motorsports Ferrari 458 Italia ended the race under safety car conditions. The No. 14 Porsche won the race while the No. 20 car was unclassified. (Note: The No. 14 car's overall victory was Porsche's first in world endurance prototype motor racing since 1989 and the first since the manufacturer competed with the RS Spyder in the American Le Mans Series.) Competing with the 919 Hybrid, Porsche scored 193 points to finish third in the World Endurance Manufacturers' Championship.

=== 2015 ===
Porsche retained all six of its drivers for 2015. For the 6 Hours of Spa-Francorchamps and the 24 Hours of Le Mans, a third 919 Hybrid was entered for GT racers Earl Bamber and Nick Tandy and Force India Formula One driver Nico Hülkenberg. Webber and Hartley qualified the re-numbered No. 17 car on pole position, and Jani and Dumas's No. 18 car took second at the season-opening 6 Hours of Silverstone. 1 hour and 20 minutes in, Webber's No. 17 Porsche retired from the lead with a rear drivetrain failure. Jani, Lieb and Dumas's sister No. 18 car used its better acceleration and straight-line speed to exchange the overall lead with André Lotterer, Marcel Fässler and Benoît Tréluyer's No. 7 Audi in slower traffic over the rest of the race but lost the battle and finished second.

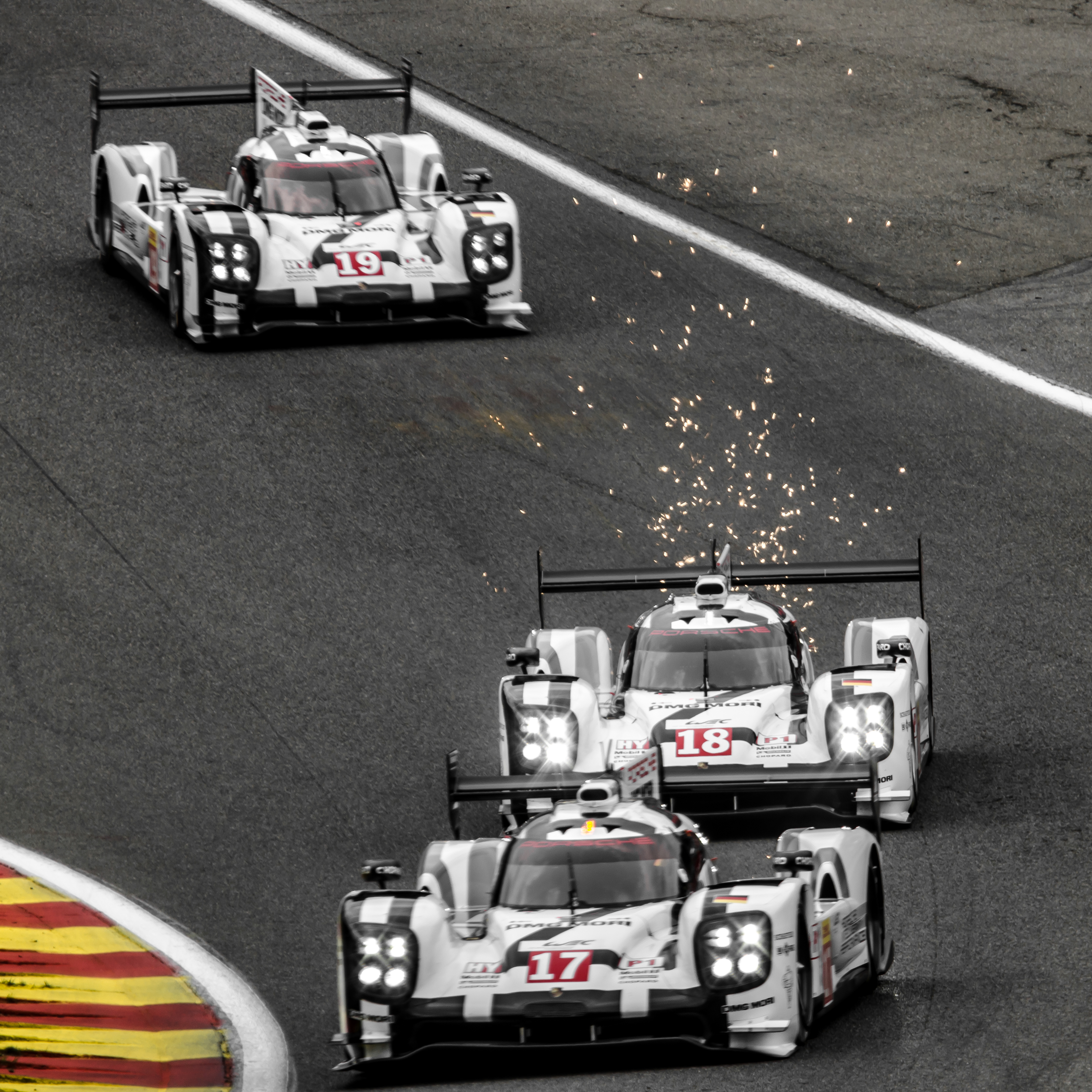
The three Porsche 919 Hybrids at the 2015 6 Hours of Spa-Francorchamps

During qualifying for the 6 Hours of Spa-Francorchamps, Porsche took the first three starting positions, with Hartley and Bernhard's No. 17 car earning pole position, Hülkenberg and Tandy's No. 19 vehicle starting second and Jani and Lieb's No. 18 entry qualifying third. Hartley led until he incurred a 15-second stop-and-go penalty for driving onto an escape road at the Bus Stop chicane, entering a gap in a tyre wall where marshals were stationed. A damper problem while he was relieved by Webber lost him more time, giving Lieb the lead. Jani and later Lieb battled Tréluyer's No. 7 Audi for the victory in the final two hours, and finished in second. The sister No. 17 recovered to third and the No. 19 came through the field for sixth after contact with Kévin Estre's No. 91 Porsche 911 RSR.

At Le Mans, Bernhard's No. 17 car broke the 2008 track record of the Circuit de la Sarthe until Jani bettered it to claim pole position in the first qualifying session. Tandy put the No. 19 Porsche in third as the team's other two cars did not improve their lap times in the following two sessions. During the race, Porsche battled with Audi, pulling away as night fell and asphalt temperatures lowered, and allowing Porsche to push harder on their tyres, matching Audi's pace though Dumas braked too late for Mulsanne Corner and hit a tyre barrier. The No. 18 car drove to the pit lane for bodywork repairs, and it recovered to finish fifth. Later, Webber was observed passing in a yellow flag zone, earning him a one-minute stop-and-go penalty and relegating the No. 17 car to second. Tandy went faster, and later Bamber took the lead midway through the 14th hour, maintaining it in Porsche's first overall Le Mans win since 1998.

For the season's fourth round, the 6 Hours of Nürburgring, Lieb and Dumas continued Porsche's unbroken streak in qualifying with pole position; Webber and Bernhard secured second. Jani led the opening stint while a broken front diveplane slowed Bernhard. An early pit stop where Webber relieved Bernhard saw the diveplane repaired, and he inherited a large lead when the No. 18 car incurred three separate stop-and-go penalties for excess fuel flow due to a faulty engine sensor. Jani recovered to second after prevailing over Lucas di Grassi and Lotterer's Audi cars as the No. 17 car won. Although Jani lacked hybrid boost on his first lap, he and Lieb won the pole position for the 6 Hours of Circuit of the Americas while Hartley and Bernhard took second. Webber overtook Jani at the start, maintaining his lead until his co-driver Bernhard took a minute stop-and-go penalty because a mechanic touched his car under refuelling conditions. Dumas's No. 18 car appeared likely to win, but a 12-volt onboard circuit issue forced him into the garage with 35 minutes left. He returned to the track to complete the final lap in 12th while Hartley achieved the No. 17 car's second successive win.

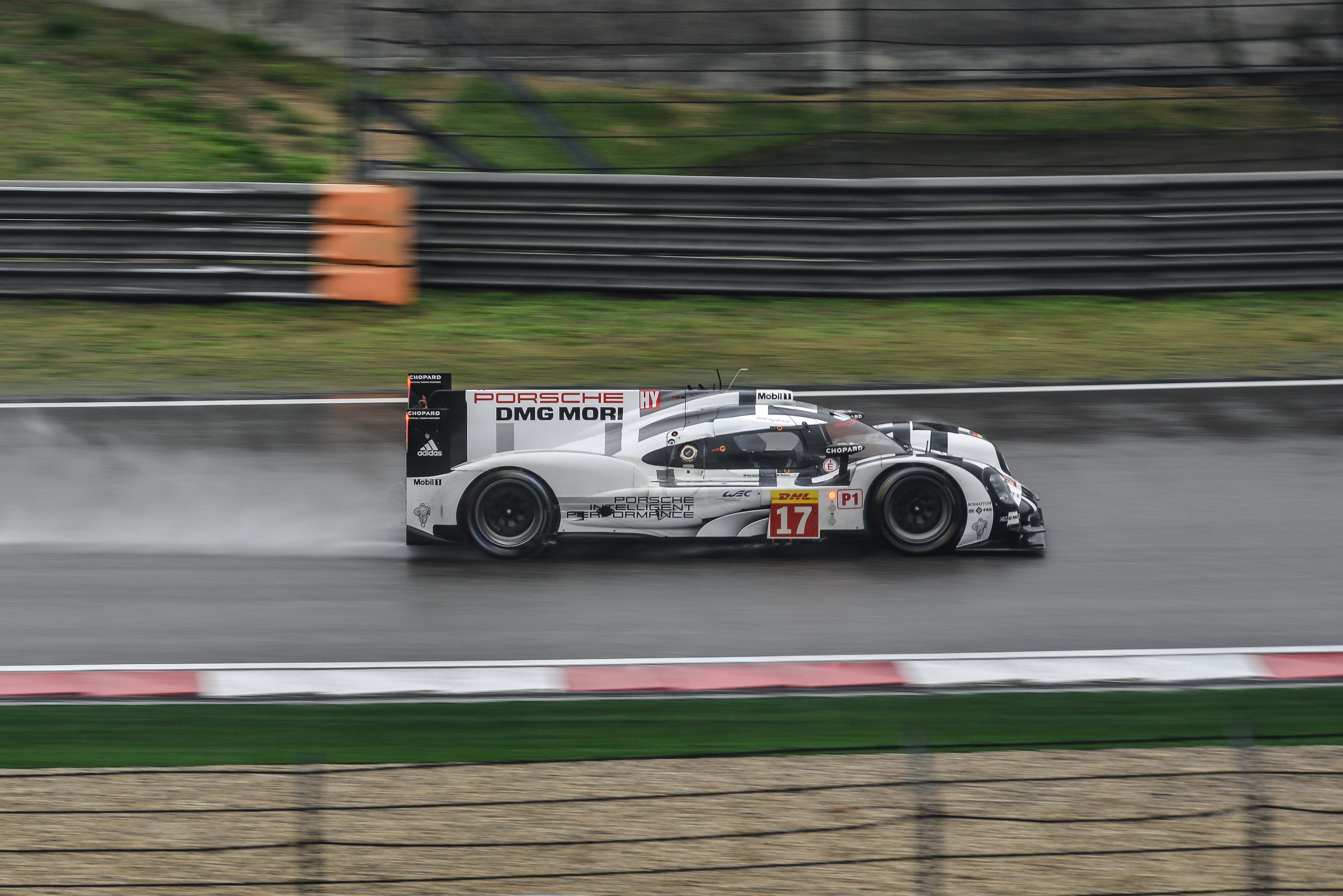
The No. 17 Porsche 919 Hybrid of Timo Bernhard, Brendon Hartley and Mark Webber won four races and the 2015 World Endurance Drivers' Championship.

In qualifying for the 6 Hours of Fuji, Porsche secured the front row with Bernhard and Webber on pole position and Dumas and Lieb in second. The race began after 40 minutes behind the safety car on a wet track, in mist and fog. Webber immediately fell to fourth following a driver error. Once the track dried, Dumas took the lead, but his crew incurred a drive-through penalty for passing under full course yellow flag conditions. Porsche invoked team orders on Jani on the final lap to give Bernhard, Webber and Hartley the win. At the 6 Hours of Shanghai, Hartley and Webber took another pole position with Lieb and Dumas again in second. Hartley led the weather-affected race from the start, but Lieb hit Lotterer's No. 7 Audi and spun on a kerb. Jani took over the No. 18 entry; he recovered to pass the Audi cars for the lead, but Dumas spun with 1 hour and 20 minutes to go. The No. 18 car recovered to second while Bernhard and Webber's No. 17 car won its fourth race of 2015 and the World Manufacturers' Championship for Porsche with one race left in the season. (Note: It was Porsche's 13th Manufacturers' Championship in endurance racing and its first title since Derek Bell won the 1986 World Sportscar Championship.)

Entering the season-closing 6 Hours of Bahrain, Bernhard, Hartley and Webber led the World Endurance Drivers' Championship by 12 points over Lotterer, Fässler and Tréluyer's No. 7 Audi; a fifth-place finish by them and a first-place finish by their rivals would lose them the title. They increased their advantage by one point after Hartley and Bernhard set the fastest two-lap average in qualifying. This also ensured that Porsche won every pole position of 2015. Jani and Lieb began from second. Bernhard lost five laps due to a broken throttle actuator and a front axle energy recovery system failure in the fifth hour. Webber completed the race on hybrid power in fifth to secure his, Hartley's and Bernhard's first Drivers' Championship. Dumas, Jani and Lieb beat the mechanically impaired Audi cars in a mid-race battle for the No. 18 team's only win of 2015. Competing with the 919 Hybrid for the second successive year, Porsche accumulated 344 points to win the World Manufacturers' Championship. At the inaugural post-season rookie test at the Bahrain International Circuit, GP2 Series driver Mitch Evans and two-time Indianapolis 500 winner Juan Pablo Montoya shared a 919 Hybrid.

=== 2016 ===
Porsche kept all six of its drivers for 2016. The company made a joint decision with Audi not to field a third car for the 24 Hours of Le Mans as a cost-cutting measure in anticipation of potential financial penalties from the Volkswagen emissions scandal. At the season-opening 6 Hours of Silverstone, Hartley and Webber's No. 1 entry qualified third while Jani and Dumas's sister No. 2 entry took fourth, ending Porsche's streak of pole positions that extended back to the 2014 6 Hours of Fuji. Webber passed the Audi cars of Oliver Jarvis and Lotterer in the first hour before Hartley relieved him. The No. 1 car retired from heavy contact with Michael Wainwright's No. 86 Gulf Racing Porsche 911 RSR at the exit of Farm Corner. The No. 2 car battled the No. 7 Audi for the lead until Jani made an unscheduled pit stop to replace a puncture, finishing 47 seconds behind in second. Later, Porsche inherited the victory after the Audi was disqualified for illegal skid block wear.

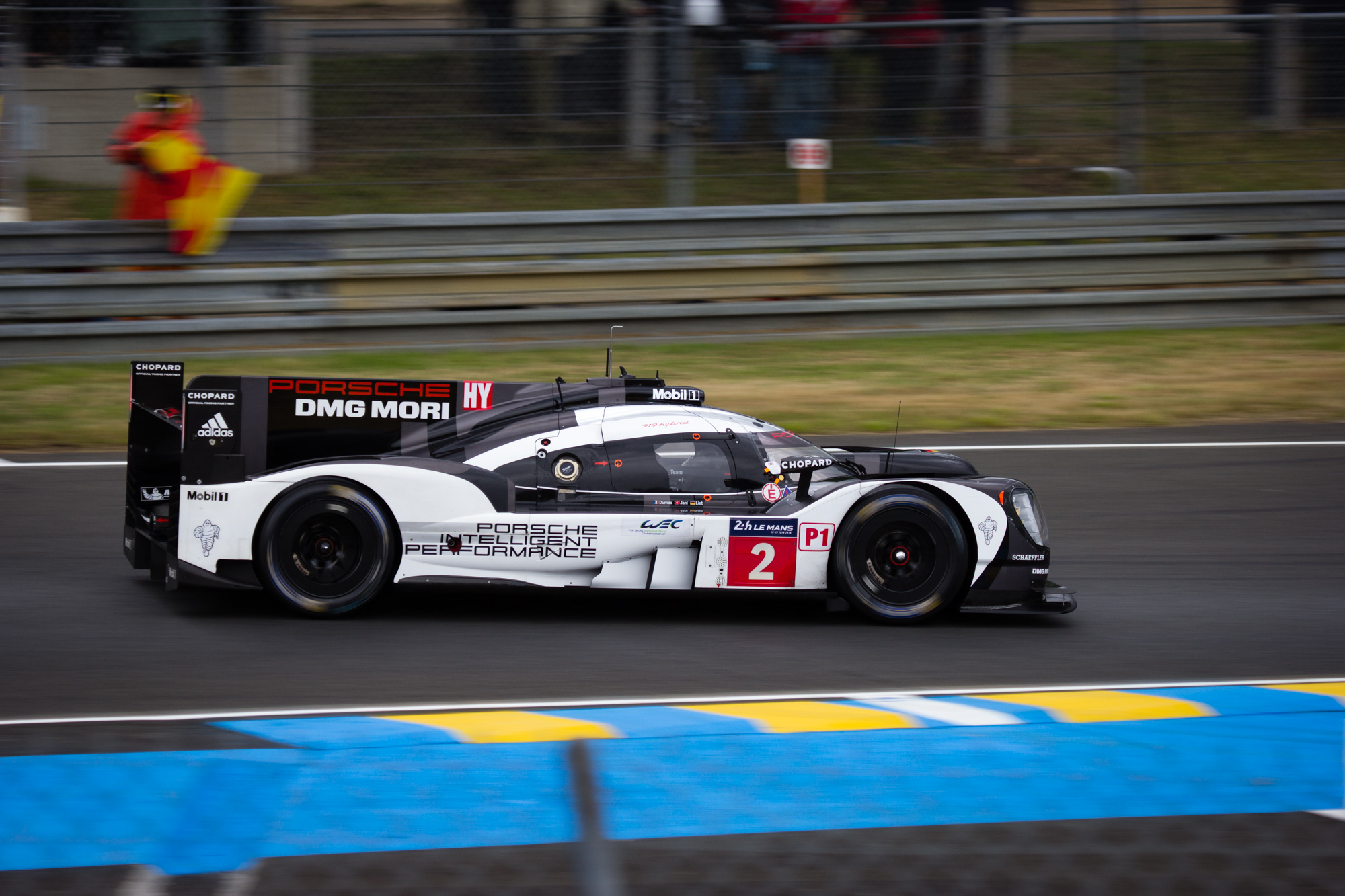
The No. 2 Porsche 919 Hybrid of Romain Dumas, Neel Jani and Marc Lieb won two races, including the 24 Hours of Le Mans, and the team's second consecutive World Endurance Drivers' Championship.

Hartley and Bernhard won Porsche's first pole position of 2016 in qualifying for the 6 Hours of Spa-Francorchamps and were joined by Jani and Lieb on the grid's front row. In the race, the No. 1 car led until Bernhard and later Webber sustained two left-front punctures and spent 1 hour, 40 minutes replacing the front axle gearbox. It later emerged on the track to finish 27th overall and earned championship points for completing 70% of the total distance. The No. 2 car's main energy recovery system was switched off, stopping its drivers unable from using the car's full electric power capability though they came second. At Le Mans, Jani took pole position in the first ten minutes of qualifying while Bernard took second as heavy rain fell the following day. Porsche's No. 2 car battled Toyota for the win. The No. 1 car required a water pump change and recovered to finish 13th overall. Jani, Lieb and Dumas changed their fuel strategy to match Toyota with 14 laps on track and took Porsche's 18th overall Le Mans victory after the No. 5 Toyota's connector line linking the turbocharger and intercooler failed.

Webber and Bernhard qualified ahead of Jani and Lieb at the 6 Hours of Nürburgring; they started third and fourth, respectively. Porsche prevailed against Audi by making pit stops during a series of full course yellow flags and passed Jarvis' car. Although a slow puncture put the No. 1 team off strategy, Bernhard overtook his teammate Jani to win after the latter incurred a drive-through penalty for hitting the No. 88 Abu Dhabi-Proton Racing Porsche 911 RSR. The No. 2 car finished fourth after Lotterer's No. 7 Audi passed Jani. At the inaugural 6 Hours of Mexico, Dumas and Jani put the No. 2 car in second, and Hartley and Webber's No. 1 car qualified fourth. The No. 1 car led early in the second hour and maintained it until a drive-through penalty two hours later for crossing the pit entry line after aborting a pit stop. Nonetheless, tyre changes in response to inclement weather allowed Bernhard to win. The No. 2 car was slower and finished fourth after Nicolas Lapierre's No. 36 Signatech Alpine A460 hit Lieb and removed part of the Porsche's rear-left bodywork.

For the 6 Hours of Circuit of the Americas, Bernhard and Hartley's No. 1 car qualified in third and Dumas and Jani's No. 2 car took fifth after Dumas's fastest lap was deleted for a track limits violation. After multiple mechanical problems and driver errors from Audi and the activation of a full course yellow flag with two hours and seven minutes remaining, the No. 1 car won its third race in a row. The No. 2 team lacked its sister vehicle's speed and finished a lap adrift in fourth. At the 6 Hours of Fuji four weeks later, Bernhard and Webber qualified the No. 1 car in second while a handling imbalance left Jani and Dumas's No. 2 car in sixth. The No. 1 car lost a tactical exchange of position to Toyota's No. 6 TS050 Hybrid and fell to third with an aerodynamic and car balance inefficiency. The sister No. 2 vehicle was fifth after tyre debris in its front bodywork disrupted its aerodynamics and handling and necessitated a replacement after 110 laps.

At the season's penultimate round, the 6 Hours of Shanghai in November, Hartley and Webber claimed pole position despite Hartley's first lap being nullified for a track limits violation while Lieb and Jani qualified sixth after Lieb's first lap was voided for excess fuel consumption. Hartley lost the lead to Buemi at the start but retook it soon after, and the No. 1 team won to claim Porsche's second consecutive World Endurance Manufacturers' Championship despite replacing the front wing following rubber debris accumulation. The No. 2 team lost to Toyota and came fourth. It entered the season-ending 6 Hours of Bahrain 17-points ahead of Toyota's No. 6 team, needing to finish at least fifth if the latter squad finished first to earn Porsche's second consecutive World Drivers' Championship. Hartley and Bernhard's No. 1 entry started second and Jani and Lieb's No. 2 car third. The No. 1 car held off the No. 5 Toyota to finish third, and the No. 2 Porsche claimed the World Drivers' Championship after finishing three laps down in sixth; Jani sustained a left-rear puncture and rear bodywork damage from contact with KCMG 's No. 78 Porsche 911 RSR 50 minutes in. Competing with the 919 Hybrid for the third successive year, Porsche accrued 324 points to win the World Manufacturers' Championship. The day after the 6 Hours of Bahrain, 2016 LMP2 champion Gustavo Menezes and driver adviser Yannick Dalmas tested a 919 Hybrid at the post-season rookie test at the Bahrain International Circuit.

=== 2017 ===
After the 2016 season, Lieb and Dumas were dropped from the team, and Webber retired from motor racing. Lieb and Dumas were replaced by Lotterer, who transferred from Audi's discontinued LMP1 project, and Tandy was promoted from Porsche's IMSA WeatherTech SportsCar Championship GT team, to share the No. 1 car with Jani. Bamber moved from Porsche's GT programme to share the No. 2 car with Bernhard and Hartley. Tandy and Jani qualified third at the season-opening 6 Hours of Silverstone while Bernhard and Hartley started fourth. A final late pit stop for fuel put Hartley in the lead, but he lost the win to a pass by Buemi's No. 8 Toyota with 12 minutes remaining; the No. 2 team were 6.173 seconds adrift in second. Tandy led during a brief rain shower in the third hour though the No. 1 car lost position during a pit stop to change from the intermediate compound tyre to slick dry tyres when the weather improved, taking third.

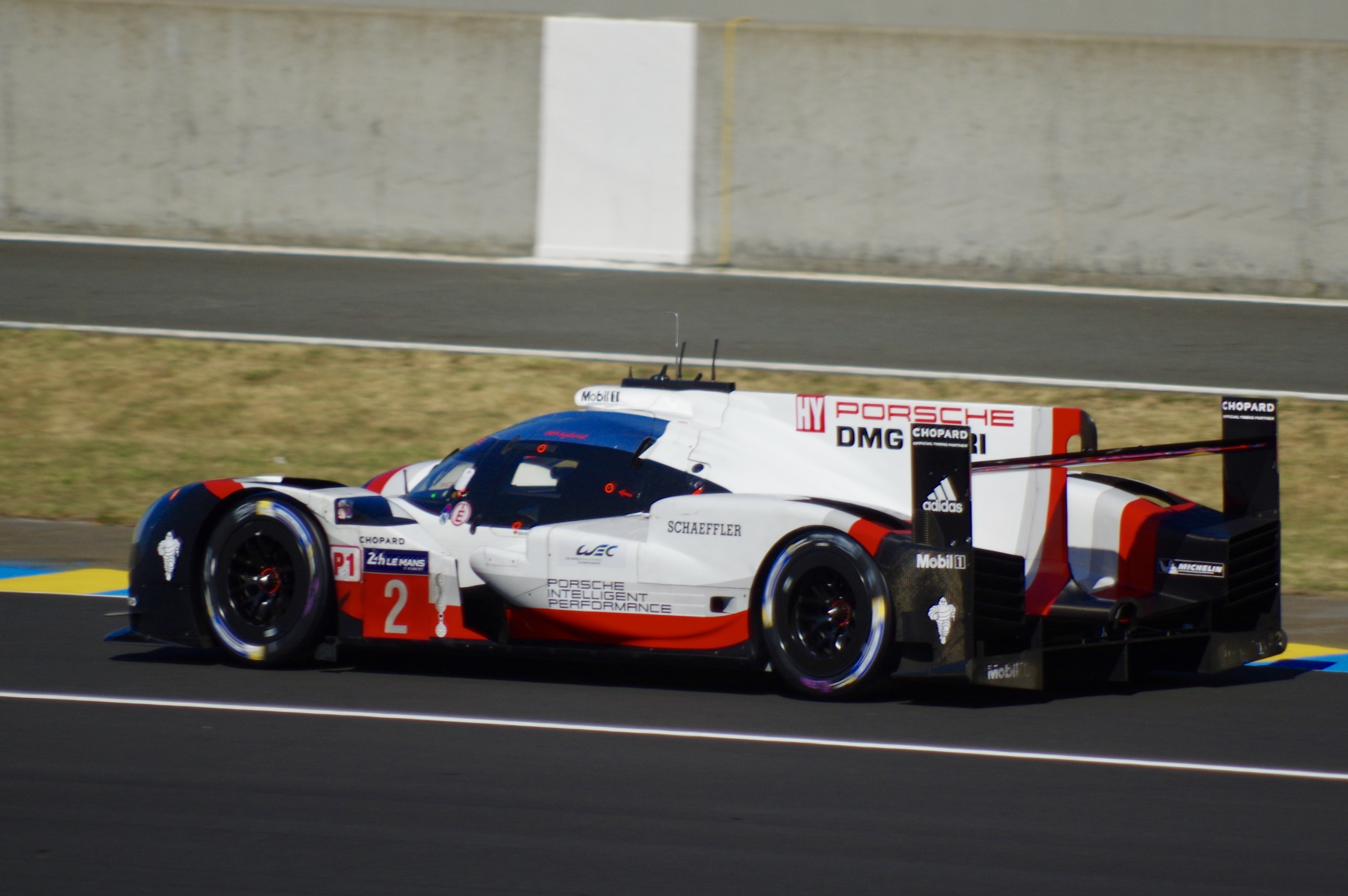
The 2017 24 Hours of Le Mans race-winning No. 2 Porsche 919 Hybrid

Three weeks later in qualifying at the 6 Hours of Spa-Francorchamps, the No. 1 car of Jani and Lotterer earned Porsche's first pole position of the season, and three Toyotas separated Hartley and Bernhard's No. 2 car in fifth after Hartley made an error at the Bus Stop chicane. Hartley recovered from a slow puncture in the third hour to pass Mike Conway's No. 7 Toyota for second place two hours later, but contact with Dumas's No. 36 Singatech Alpine A470 forced the No. 2 Porsche into the pit lane to replace its front-left corner, relegating it to third. Tyre wear restricted the No. 1 car to fourth. At Le Mans, Jani and Bernhard set the team's best times in the second qualifying session to start from third and fourth, respectively. The No. 2 Porsche was delayed for 65 minutes and 19 laps because of a front MGU replacement. The No. 1 car took the lead when the No. 7 Toyota retired with a broken clutch during the night. Engine problems in the 21st hour forced Lotterer to retire the No. 1 car. Bernhard's No. 2 car recovered and overtook Ho-Pin Tung's No. 38 Jackie Chan DC Racing Oreca 07 with 1 hour and 7 minutes left to achieve Porsche's third consecutive and 19th overall Le Mans victory.

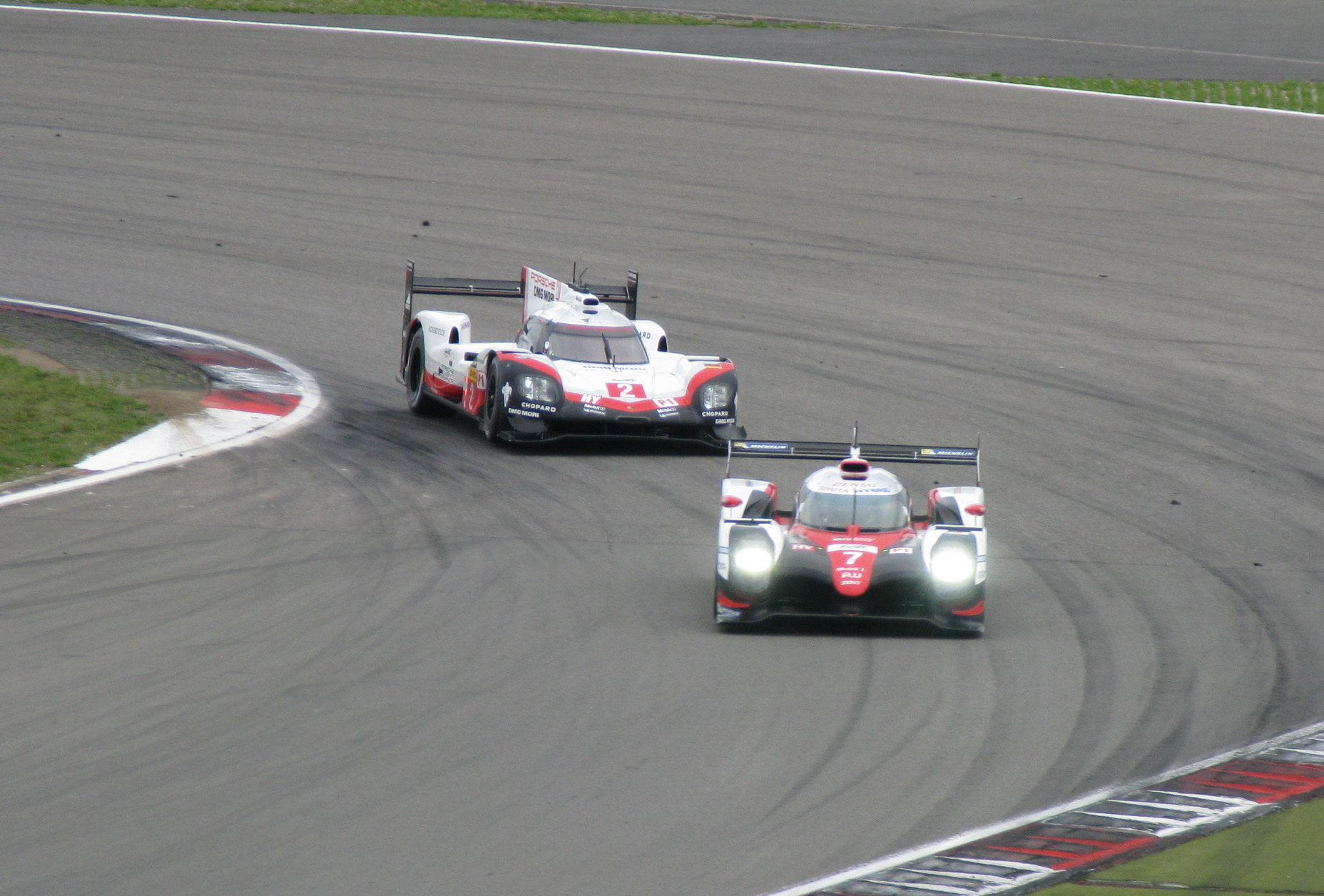
Brendon Hartley's No. 2 Porsche 919 Hybrid battling José María López's No. 7 Toyota TS050 Hybrid at the 2017 6 Hours of Nürburgring

During qualifying for the 6 Hours of Nürburgring a month later, Toyota outpaced Porsche, and Bernhard and Hartley's No. 2 car started second with Jani and Lotterer's No. 1 car third. Hartley overtook José María López's No. 7 Toyota for the lead in the second hour; the two Porsches exchanged the lead several times and controlled the pace. At the last pit stop in the final ten minutes, Porsche invoked team orders to delay Lotterer for 20 seconds, allowing the No. 2 car to win for the second successive race. Bernhard and Hartley's No. 2 car qualified ahead of Tandy and Lotterer's No. 1 car in its first pole position of 2017 at the 6 Hours of Mexico. Hartley led Tandy, who fell back when Lotterer took a drive-through penalty for pit lane over-speeding because of a faulty speed limiter. Bamber had a defective FIA-mandated fuel flow sensor replaced at a pit stop. The No. 2 car won by 7.141 seconds over the sister No. 1 car.

Although Tandy's first qualifying lap of the 6 Hours of Circuit of the Americas was deleted for a track limits transgression, he and Jani were 0.2 seconds faster than Bamber and Bernhard's No. 2 car for pole position. Porsche won a near race-long battle with Toyota as the No. 1 car was issued team orders to relinquish the lead to Bernhard with eight minutes remaining, and the latter took the No. 2 team's fourth consecutive win by 0.276 seconds. One month later at the 6 Hours of Fuji, Bamber and Hartley took the No. 2 car's second pole position of 2017 while Lotterer and Tandy qualified the No. 1 car in second. Lotterer damaged the No. 1 car's dive plane against the rear of Buemi's Toyota in the first hour; although it slowed the car, its crew finished the rain-shortened event in third while the No. 2 car finished fourth after failing to match Toyota's speed.

Entering the 6 Hours of Shanghai, the No. 2 car was 39 points ahead of Toyota's No. 8 car and had to finish at least third to win Porsche's third World Endurance Drivers' Championship with one race to go. In qualifying, Tandy and Lotterer's No. 1 car took second despite Lotterer's first lap being disallowed for a track limits violation. Bamber and Hartley started fourth after Bamber spun. The No. 2 car was slower than the Toyota, but it finished second to win the World Endurance Drivers' Championship. The No. 1 car recovered from a faulty throttle sensor for third and achieved Porsche's third consecutive World Manufacturers' Championship. At the season-closing 6 Hours of Bahrain, Tandy and Jani's No. 1 car took pole position, and Bernhard and Hartley's No. 2 car was third. The following day, a trackside bollard got lodged underneath the No. 2 vehicle's front bodywork, and Bernhard lost 80 seconds in the pit lane but he recovered to second place. Jani was overtaken by Buemi in the first hour, and Tandy damaged his left-front corner in lapping Nick Foster's No. 86 Gulf Racing Porsche 911 RSR in the fourth hour, earning him a drive-through penalty, but the No. 1 car took third. Competing with the 919 Hybrid for the fourth successive season, Porsche won the World Endurance Manufacturers' Championship with 337 points.

==== Retirement from competition ====
During the post-season rookie test session at the Bahrain International Circuit, the day after the 6 Hours of Bahrain, a 919 Hybrid was driven by the 2017 World Series Formula V8 3.5 champion Pietro Fittipaldi, who shared it with Bernhard. Afterwards, Porsche ended the 919 Hybrid programme to concentrate on the all-electric single-seater Formula E championship in the 2019–20 season but increased its commitment to its global GT programmes.

== Complete World Endurance Championship results ==
(key) Races in bold indicates pole position. Races in italics indicates fastest lap.

Complete FIA World Endurance Championship results
Year	Entrant	Class	Drivers	No.	Rds.	Rounds									Pts.	Pos.
Year	Entrant	Class	Drivers	No.	Rds.	1	2	3	4	5	6	7	8	9	Pts.	Pos.
2014	Porsche Team	LMP1-H	(France) Romain Dumas (Switzerland) Neel Jani (Germany) Marc Lieb	14	1–8; 1–8; 1–8	SIL; Ret	**SPA**; **4**	LMS; 4	COA; 4	FUJ; 4	**SHA**; **3**	**BHR**; **2**	SÃO; 1		193	3rd
2014	Porsche Team	LMP1-H	(Germany) Timo Bernhard (New Zealand) Brendon Hartley (Australia) Mark Webber	20	1–8; 1–8; 1–8	SIL; 3	SPA; 8	LMS; NC	COA; 5	FUJ; 3	SHA; 6	BHR; 3	**SÃO**; **Ret**		193	3rd
2015	Porsche Team	LMP1	(Germany) Timo Bernhard (New Zealand) Brendon Hartley (Australia) Mark Webber	17	1–8; 1–8; 1–8	**SIL**; **Ret**	**SPA**; **3**	LMS; 2	NÜR; 1	COA; 1	**FUJ**; **1**	**SHA**; **1**	**BHR**; **5**		344	1st
2015	Porsche Team	LMP1	(France) Romain Dumas (Switzerland) Neel Jani (Germany) Marc Lieb	18	1–8; 1–8; 1–8	SIL; 2	SPA; 2	**LMS**; **5**	**NÜR**; **2**	**COA**; **5**	FUJ; 2	SHA; 2	BHR; 1		344	1st
2015	Porsche Team	LMP1	(New Zealand) Earl Bamber (Germany) Nico Hülkenberg (United Kingdom) Nick Tandy	19	2–3; 2–3; 2–3		SPA; 6	LMS; 1							344	1st
2016	Porsche Team	LMP1	(Germany) Timo Bernhard (New Zealand) Brendon Hartley (Australia) Mark Webber	1	1–9; 1–9; 1–9	SIL; Ret	**SPA**; **4**	LMS; 5	NÜR; 1	MEX; 1	COA; 1	FUJ; 3	SHA; **1**	BHR; 3	324	1st
2016	Porsche Team	LMP1	(France) Romain Dumas (Switzerland) Neel Jani (Germany) Marc Lieb	2	1–9; 1–9; 1–9	SIL; 1	SPA; 2	**LMS**; **1**	NÜR; 4	MEX; 4	COA; 4	FUJ; 5	**SHA**; 4	BHR; 6	324	1st
2017	Porsche LMP Team	LMP1	(Switzerland) Neel Jani (United Kingdom) Nick Tandy (Germany) André Lotterer	1	1–9; 1–9; 1–9	SIL; 3	**SPA**; **4**	LMS; Ret	NÜR; 2	MEX; 2	**COA**; **2**	FUJ; 3	SHA; 3	**BHR**; **3**	337	1st
2017	Porsche LMP Team	LMP1	(Germany) Timo Bernhard (New Zealand) Brendon Hartley (New Zealand) Earl Bamber	2	1–9; 1–9; 1–9	SIL; 2	SPA; 3	LMS; 1	NÜR; 1	**MEX**; **1**	COA; 1	**FUJ**; **4**	SHA; 2	BHR; 2	337	1st

== 24 Hours of Le Mans results ==
Year	Team	Drivers	Car #	Class	Laps	Pos.	Class Pos.
2014	(Germany) Porsche Team	(France) Romain Dumas (Switzerland) Neel Jani (Germany) Marc Lieb	14	LMP1-H	348	11th	4th
2014	(Germany) Porsche Team	(Germany) Timo Bernhard (New Zealand) Brendon Hartley (Australia) Mark Webber	20	LMP1-H	346	NC	NC
2015	(Germany) Porsche Team	(Germany) Timo Bernhard (New Zealand) Brendon Hartley (Australia) Mark Webber	17	LMP1	394	2nd	2nd
2015	(Germany) Porsche Team	(France) Romain Dumas (Switzerland) Neel Jani (Germany) Marc Lieb	18	LMP1	391	5th	5th
2015	(Germany) Porsche Team	(New Zealand) Earl Bamber (Germany) Nico Hülkenberg (United Kingdom) Nick Tandy	19	LMP1	395	1st	1st
2016	(Germany) Porsche Team	(Germany) Timo Bernhard (New Zealand) Brendon Hartley (Australia) Mark Webber	1	LMP1	346	13th	5th
2016	(Germany) Porsche Team	(France) Romain Dumas (Switzerland) Neel Jani (Germany) Marc Lieb	2	LMP1	384	1st	1st
2017	(Germany) Porsche LMP Team	(Switzerland) Neel Jani (United Kingdom) Nick Tandy (Germany) Andre Lotterer	1	LMP1	318	DNF	DNF
2017	(Germany) Porsche LMP Team	(Germany) Timo Bernhard (New Zealand) Brendon Hartley (New Zealand) Earl Bamber	2	LMP1	346	1st	1st

== See also ==
- Audi R18 e-tron quattro
- Nissan GT-R LM Nismo
- Toyota TS040 Hybrid
- Toyota TS050 Hybrid
