= 2017 6 Hours of Bahrain =

Sports car endurance race held at Bahrain International Circuit, Sakhir, Bahrain

Coordinates: 26°1′57″N 50°30′38″E

Event information
- Round 9 of 9 in the 2017 FIA World Endurance Championship
- Date: 18 November 2017
- Location: Sakhir
- Venue: Bahrain International Circuit
- Duration: 6 Hours

Results
- Laps completed: 199
- Distance (km): 1076.988
- Distance (miles): 669.237
- LMP1

Pole position
- Time: 1:39.383
- Team: (Germany) Porsche LMP Team

Winners
- Team: (Japan) Toyota Gazoo Racing
- Drivers: (United Kingdom) Anthony Davidson (Switzerland) Sébastien Buemi (Japan) Kazuki Nakajima
- LMP2

Winners
- Team: (Switzerland) Rebellion Racing
- Drivers: (France) Julien Canal (France) Nicolas Prost (Brazil) Bruno Senna
- LMGTE Pro

Winners
- Team: (Italy) AF Corse
- Drivers: (Italy) Davide Rigon (United Kingdom) Sam Bird
- LMGTE Am

Winners
- Team: (United Kingdom) Aston Martin Racing
- Drivers: (Canada) Paul Dalla Lana (Portugal) Pedro Lamy (Austria) Mathias Lauda

The 2017 6 Hours of Bahrain was an endurance sports car racing event held at the Bahrain International Circuit, Sakhir, Bahrain on 16–18 November 2017, and served as the ninth and last race of the 2017 FIA World Endurance Championship. Toyota's Anthony Davidson, Sébastien Buemi and Kazuki Nakajima won the race driving the No. 8 Toyota TS050 Hybrid. This was the last race of the Porsche 919 Hybrid. This would be the last time the race would be run in a 6 Hours format, with the race being extended to 8 hours for the 2019–20 FIA World Endurance Championship, after being absent from the 2018–19 FIA World Endurance Championship.

== Qualifying ==
=== Qualifying result ===
Performance done during the qualifying session (Pole position in Class is in bold)
Pos	Class	N°	Team	Driver	Times	Grid A
**1**	**LMP1**	**1**	**(Germany) Porsche LMP Team**	**(Switzerland) Neel Jani**	**1 min 39 s 383**	**1**
2	LMP1	7	(Japan) Toyota Gazoo Racing	(United Kingdom) Mike Conway	1 min 39 s 646	2
3	LMP1	2	(Germany) Porsche LMP Team	(Germany) Timo Bernhard	1 min 40 s 011	3
4	LMP1	8	(Japan) Toyota Gazoo Racing	(Japan) Kazuki Nakajima	1 min 40 s 774	4
**5**	**LMP2**	**36**	**(France) Signatech Alpine Matmut**	**(Brazil) André Negrão**	**1 min 47 s 227**	**5**
6	LMP2	38	(China) Jackie Chan DC Racing	(France) Thomas Laurent	1 min 47 s 612	6
7	LMP2	31	(Switzerland) Vaillante Rebellion	(Brazil) Bruno Senna	1 min 47 s 721	7
8	LMP2	26	(Russia) G-Drive Racing	(France) Loïc Duval	1 min 47 s 989	8
9	LMP2	25	(China) CEFC Manor TRS Racing	(Russia) Vitaly Petrov	1 min 48 s 176	9
10	LMP2	24	(China) CEFC Manor TRS Racing	(United Kingdom) Ben Hanley	1 min 48 s 374	10
11	LMP2	28	(France) TDS Racing	(France) Matthieu Vaxiviere	1 min 48 s 386	11
12	LMP2	13	(Switzerland) Vaillante Rebellion	(Brazil) Nelson Piquet Jr.	1 min 48 s 387	12
13	LMP2	37	(China) Jackie Chan DC Racing	(France) Tristan Gommendy	1 min 49s 102	13
**14**	**LMGTE-Pro**	**71**	**(Italy) AF Corse**	**(Italy) Davide Rigon**	**1 min 56 s 033**	**14**
15	LMGTE-Pro	97	(United Kingdom) Aston Martin Racing	(United Kingdom) Darren Turner	1 min 56 s 372	15
16	LMGTE-Pro	67	(United States) Ford Chip Ganassi Team UK	(United Kingdom) Harry Tincknell	1 min 56 s 463	16
17	LMGTE-Pro	51	(Italy) AF Corse	(United Kingdom) James Calado	1 min 56 s 881	17
18	LMGTE-Pro	95	(United Kingdom) Aston Martin Racing	(Denmark) Marco Sørensen	1 min 57 s 019	18
19	LMGTE Pro	91	(Germany) Porsche GT Team	(France) Frédéric Makowiecki	1 min 57 s 516	19
20	LMGTE Pro	92	(Germany) Porsche GT Team	(France) Kévin Estre	1 min 57 s 522	20
**21**	**LMGTE Am**	**98**	**(United Kingdom) Aston Martin Racing**	**(Portugal) Pedro Lamy**	**2 min 00 s 111**	**21**
22	LMGTE Am	61	(Singapore) Clearwater Racing	(Republic of Ireland) Matt Griffin	2 min 00 s 285	22
23	LMGTE Am	77	(Germany) Dempsey-Proton Racing	(Germany) Christian Ried	2 min 00 s 395	23
24	LMGTE Am	54	(Switzerland) Spirit of Race	(Italy) Francesco Castellacci	2 min 01 s 352	24
25	LMGTE Pro	66	(United States) Ford Chip Ganassi Team UK	(France) Olivier Pla	1 min 57 s 588	25
26	LMGTE Am	86	(United Kingdom) Gulf Racing UK			26

== Race ==
=== Race result ===
Class winners are denoted with a yellow background.

Pos	Class	No	Team	Drivers	Chassis	Tyre	Laps	Time/Retired
Pos	Class	No	Team	Drivers	Engine	Tyre	Laps	Time/Retired
1	LMP1	8	(Japan) Toyota Gazoo Racing	(United Kingdom) Anthony Davidson (Switzerland) Sébastien Buemi (Japan) Kazuki Nakajima	Toyota TS050 Hybrid	MI	199	6:01:26.294
1	LMP1	8	(Japan) Toyota Gazoo Racing	(United Kingdom) Anthony Davidson (Switzerland) Sébastien Buemi (Japan) Kazuki Nakajima	Toyota 2.4 L Turbo V6	MI	199	6:01:26.294
2	LMP1	2	(Germany) Porsche LMP Team	(Germany) Timo Bernhard (New Zealand) Earl Bamber (New Zealand) Brendon Hartley	Porsche 919 Hybrid	MI	198	+1 Lap
2	LMP1	2	(Germany) Porsche LMP Team	(Germany) Timo Bernhard (New Zealand) Earl Bamber (New Zealand) Brendon Hartley	Porsche 2.0 L Turbo V4	MI	198	+1 Lap
3	LMP1	1	(Germany) Porsche LMP Team	(Switzerland) Neel Jani (United Kingdom) Nick Tandy (Germany) André Lotterer	Porsche 919 Hybrid	MI	198	+1 Lap
3	LMP1	1	(Germany) Porsche LMP Team	(Switzerland) Neel Jani (United Kingdom) Nick Tandy (Germany) André Lotterer	Porsche 2.0 L Turbo V4	MI	198	+1 Lap
4	LMP1	7	(Japan) Toyota Gazoo Racing	(United Kingdom) Mike Conway (Japan) Kamui Kobayashi (Argentina) José María López	Toyota TS050 Hybrid	MI	196	+3 Laps
4	LMP1	7	(Japan) Toyota Gazoo Racing	(United Kingdom) Mike Conway (Japan) Kamui Kobayashi (Argentina) José María López	Toyota 2.4 L Turbo V6	MI	196	+3 Laps
5	LMP2	31	(Switzerland) Vaillante Rebellion	(France) Julien Canal (France) Nicolas Prost (Brazil) Bruno Senna	Oreca 07	D	186	+13 Laps
5	LMP2	31	(Switzerland) Vaillante Rebellion	(France) Julien Canal (France) Nicolas Prost (Brazil) Bruno Senna	Gibson GK428 4.2 L V8	D	186	+13 Laps
6	LMP2	38	(China) Jackie Chan DC Racing	(China) Ho-Pin Tung (United Kingdom) Oliver Jarvis (France) Thomas Laurent	Oreca 07	D	186	+13 Laps
6	LMP2	38	(China) Jackie Chan DC Racing	(China) Ho-Pin Tung (United Kingdom) Oliver Jarvis (France) Thomas Laurent	Gibson GK428 4.2 L V8	D	186	+13 Laps
7	LMP2	13	(Switzerland) Vaillante Rebellion	(Switzerland) Mathias Beche (Denmark) David Heinemeier Hansson (Brazil) Nelson Piquet Jr.	Oreca 07	D	185	+14 Laps
7	LMP2	13	(Switzerland) Vaillante Rebellion	(Switzerland) Mathias Beche (Denmark) David Heinemeier Hansson (Brazil) Nelson Piquet Jr.	Gibson GK428 4.2 L V8	D	185	+14 Laps
8	LMP2	36	(France) Signatech Alpine Matmut	(France) Nicolas Lapierre (United States) Gustavo Menezes (Brazil) André Negrão	Alpine A470	D	185	+14 Laps
8	LMP2	36	(France) Signatech Alpine Matmut	(France) Nicolas Lapierre (United States) Gustavo Menezes (Brazil) André Negrão	Gibson GK428 4.2 L V8	D	185	+14 Laps
9	LMP2	25	(China) CEFC Manor TRS Racing	(Mexico) Roberto González (Switzerland) Simon Trummer (Russia) Vitaly Petrov	Oreca 07	D	185	+14 Laps
9	LMP2	25	(China) CEFC Manor TRS Racing	(Mexico) Roberto González (Switzerland) Simon Trummer (Russia) Vitaly Petrov	Gibson GK428 4.2 L V8	D	185	+14 Laps
10	LMP2	24	(China) CEFC Manor TRS Racing	(United Kingdom) Matt Rao (United Kingdom) Ben Hanley (France) Jean-Éric Vergne	Oreca 07	D	185	+14 Laps
10	LMP2	24	(China) CEFC Manor TRS Racing	(United Kingdom) Matt Rao (United Kingdom) Ben Hanley (France) Jean-Éric Vergne	Gibson GK428 4.2 L V8	D	185	+14 Laps
11	LMP2	26	(Russia) G-Drive Racing	(Russia) Roman Rusinov (France) Léo Roussel (France) Loïc Duval	Oreca 07	D	184	+15 Laps
11	LMP2	26	(Russia) G-Drive Racing	(Russia) Roman Rusinov (France) Léo Roussel (France) Loïc Duval	Gibson GK428 4.2 L V8	D	184	+15 Laps
12	LMP2	37	(China) Jackie Chan DC Racing	(China) David Cheng (United Kingdom) Alex Brundle (France) Tristan Gommendy	Oreca 07	D	183	+16 Laps
12	LMP2	37	(China) Jackie Chan DC Racing	(China) David Cheng (United Kingdom) Alex Brundle (France) Tristan Gommendy	Gibson GK428 4.2 L V8	D	183	+16 Laps
13	LMP2	28	(France) TDS Racing	(France) François Perrodo (France) Matthieu Vaxiviere (France) Emmanuel Collard	Oreca 07	D	182	+17 Laps
13	LMP2	28	(France) TDS Racing	(France) François Perrodo (France) Matthieu Vaxiviere (France) Emmanuel Collard	Gibson GK428 4.2 L V8	D	182	+17 Laps
14	LMGTE; Pro	71	(Italy) AF Corse	(Italy) Davide Rigon (United Kingdom) Sam Bird	Ferrari 488 GTE	MI	175	+24 Laps
14	LMGTE; Pro	71	(Italy) AF Corse	(Italy) Davide Rigon (United Kingdom) Sam Bird	Ferrari F154CB 3.9 L Turbo V8	MI	175	+24 Laps
15	LMGTE; Pro	51	(Italy) AF Corse	(United Kingdom) James Calado (Italy) Alessandro Pier Guidi	Ferrari 488 GTE	MI	175	+24 Laps
15	LMGTE; Pro	51	(Italy) AF Corse	(United Kingdom) James Calado (Italy) Alessandro Pier Guidi	Ferrari F154CB 3.9 L Turbo V8	MI	175	+24 Laps
16	LMGTE; Pro	67	(United States) Ford Chip Ganassi Team UK	(United Kingdom) Andy Priaulx (United Kingdom) Harry Tincknell	Ford GT	MI	174	+25 Laps
16	LMGTE; Pro	67	(United States) Ford Chip Ganassi Team UK	(United Kingdom) Andy Priaulx (United Kingdom) Harry Tincknell	Ford EcoBoost 3.5 L Turbo V6	MI	174	+25 Laps
17	LMGTE; Pro	91	(Germany) Porsche GT Team	(Austria) Richard Lietz (France) Frédéric Makowiecki	Porsche 911 RSR	MI	174	+25 Laps
17	LMGTE; Pro	91	(Germany) Porsche GT Team	(Austria) Richard Lietz (France) Frédéric Makowiecki	Porsche 4.0 L Flat-6	MI	174	+25 Laps
18	LMGTE; Pro	66	(United States) Ford Chip Ganassi Team UK	(Germany) Stefan Mücke (France) Olivier Pla	Ford GT	MI	170	+25 Laps
18	LMGTE; Pro	66	(United States) Ford Chip Ganassi Team UK	(Germany) Stefan Mücke (France) Olivier Pla	Ford EcoBoost 3.5 L Turbo V6	MI	170	+25 Laps
18	LMGTE; Pro	95	(United Kingdom) Aston Martin Racing	(Denmark) Nicki Thiim (Denmark) Marco Sørensen	Aston Martin V8 Vantage GTE	D	174	+25 Laps
18	LMGTE; Pro	95	(United Kingdom) Aston Martin Racing	(Denmark) Nicki Thiim (Denmark) Marco Sørensen	Aston Martin 4.5 L V8	D	174	+25 Laps
19	LMGTE; Pro	97	(United Kingdom) Aston Martin Racing	(United Kingdom) Darren Turner (United Kingdom) Jonathan Adam	Aston Martin V8 Vantage GTE	D	174	+25 Laps
19	LMGTE; Pro	97	(United Kingdom) Aston Martin Racing	(United Kingdom) Darren Turner (United Kingdom) Jonathan Adam	Aston Martin 4.5 L V8	D	174	+25 Laps
21	LMGTE; Am	98	(United Kingdom) Aston Martin Racing	(Canada) Paul Dalla Lana (Portugal) Pedro Lamy (Austria) Mathias Lauda	Aston Martin V8 Vantage GTE	D	170	+29 Laps
21	LMGTE; Am	98	(United Kingdom) Aston Martin Racing	(Canada) Paul Dalla Lana (Portugal) Pedro Lamy (Austria) Mathias Lauda	Aston Martin 4.5 L V8	D	170	+29 Laps
22	LMGTE; Am	61	(Singapore) Clearwater Racing	(Singapore) Weng Sun Mok (Japan) Keita Sawa (Republic of Ireland) Matt Griffin	Ferrari 488 GTE	MI	170	+29 Laps
22	LMGTE; Am	61	(Singapore) Clearwater Racing	(Singapore) Weng Sun Mok (Japan) Keita Sawa (Republic of Ireland) Matt Griffin	Ferrari F154CB 3.9 L Turbo V8	MI	170	+29 Laps
23	LMGTE; Am	54	(Switzerland) Spirit of Race	(Switzerland) Thomas Flohr (Italy) Francesco Castellacci (Spain) Miguel Molina	Ferrari 488 GTE	MI	169	+30 Laps
23	LMGTE; Am	54	(Switzerland) Spirit of Race	(Switzerland) Thomas Flohr (Italy) Francesco Castellacci (Spain) Miguel Molina	Ferrari F154CB 3.9 L Turbo V8	MI	169	+30 Laps
24	LMGTE; Am	77	(Germany) Dempsey-Proton Racing	(Germany) Christian Ried (Italy) Matteo Cairoli (Germany) Marvin Dienst	Porsche 911 RSR	D	164	+31 Laps
24	LMGTE; Am	77	(Germany) Dempsey-Proton Racing	(Germany) Christian Ried (Italy) Matteo Cairoli (Germany) Marvin Dienst	Porsche 4.0 L Flat-6	D	164	+31 Laps
25	LMGTE; Am	86	(United Kingdom) Gulf Racing UK	(United Kingdom) Michael Wainwright (United Kingdom) Ben Barker (Australia) Nick Foster	Porsche 911 RSR	D	165	+30 Laps
25	LMGTE; Am	86	(United Kingdom) Gulf Racing UK	(United Kingdom) Michael Wainwright (United Kingdom) Ben Barker (Australia) Nick Foster	Porsche 4.0 L Flat-6	D	165	+30 Laps
NC	LMGTE; Pro	92	(Germany) Porsche GT Team	(Denmark) Michael Christensen (France) Kévin Estre	Porsche 911 RSR	MI	84	
NC	LMGTE; Pro	92	(Germany) Porsche GT Team	(Denmark) Michael Christensen (France) Kévin Estre	Porsche 4.0 L Flat-6	MI	84	

Previous race: 2017 6 Hours of Shanghai	FIA World Endurance Championship; 2017 season	Next race: 2018 6 Hours of Spa-Francorchamps; 2018-19 Super Season
2016 6 Hours of Bahrain	6 Hours of Bahrain	2019 8 Hours of Bahrain
