= 2017 6 Hours of Nürburgring =

Sports car endurance race in Germany

Map of the Nürburgring GP-Strecke, which was used for the race

The 2017 6 Hours of Nürburgring (formally the WEC 6 Hours of Nürburgring) was an endurance sports car racing event held at the Nürburgring, Nürburg, Germany on 16 July 2017. The race was won by the #2 Porsche 919 Hybrid, run by the factory Porsche LMP Team, with the #1 car finishing in 2nd place due to team orders being issued against them.

== Race ==
=== Race result ===
Class winners are denoted in bold.

Pos	Class	No	Team	Drivers	Chassis	Tyre	Laps	Time/Retired
Pos	Class	No	Team	Drivers	Engine	Tyre	Laps	Time/Retired
1	**LMP1**	**2**	**(Germany) Porsche LMP Team**	**(Germany) Timo Bernhard (New Zealand) Earl Bamber (New Zealand) Brendon Hartley**	**Porsche 919 Hybrid**	MI	**204**	**6:00:09.607**
1	**LMP1**	**2**	**(Germany) Porsche LMP Team**	**(Germany) Timo Bernhard (New Zealand) Earl Bamber (New Zealand) Brendon Hartley**	**Porsche 2.0 L Turbo V4**	MI	**204**	**6:00:09.607**
2	LMP1	1	(Germany) Porsche LMP Team	(Switzerland) Neel Jani (United Kingdom) Nick Tandy (Germany) André Lotterer	Porsche 919 Hybrid	MI	204	+1.606
2	LMP1	1	(Germany) Porsche LMP Team	(Switzerland) Neel Jani (United Kingdom) Nick Tandy (Germany) André Lotterer	Porsche 2.0 L Turbo V4	MI	204	+1.606
3	LMP1	7	(Japan) Toyota Gazoo Racing	(United Kingdom) Mike Conway (Japan) Kamui Kobayashi (Argentina) José María López	Toyota TS050 Hybrid	MI	204	+1:04.768
3	LMP1	7	(Japan) Toyota Gazoo Racing	(United Kingdom) Mike Conway (Japan) Kamui Kobayashi (Argentina) José María López	Toyota 2.4 L Turbo V6	MI	204	+1:04.768
4	LMP1	8	(Japan) Toyota Gazoo Racing	(United Kingdom) Anthony Davidson (Switzerland) Sébastien Buemi (Japan) Kazuki Nakajima	Toyota TS050 Hybrid	MI	199	+5 Laps
4	LMP1	8	(Japan) Toyota Gazoo Racing	(United Kingdom) Anthony Davidson (Switzerland) Sébastien Buemi (Japan) Kazuki Nakajima	Toyota 2.4 L Turbo V6	MI	199	+5 Laps
5	**LMP2**	**38**	**(China) Jackie Chan DC Racing**	**(Netherlands) Ho-Pin Tung (United Kingdom) Oliver Jarvis (France) Thomas Laurent**	**Oreca 07**	D	**191**	**+13 Laps**
5	**LMP2**	**38**	**(China) Jackie Chan DC Racing**	**(Netherlands) Ho-Pin Tung (United Kingdom) Oliver Jarvis (France) Thomas Laurent**	**Gibson GK428 4.2 L V8**	D	**191**	**+13 Laps**
6	LMP2	31	(Switzerland) Vaillante Rebellion	(France) Julien Canal (Portugal) Filipe Albuquerque (Brazil) Bruno Senna	Oreca 07	D	190	+14 Laps
6	LMP2	31	(Switzerland) Vaillante Rebellion	(France) Julien Canal (Portugal) Filipe Albuquerque (Brazil) Bruno Senna	Gibson GK428 4.2 L V8	D	190	+14 Laps
7	LMP2	36	(France) Signatech Alpine Matmut	(France) Nicolas Lapierre (United States) Gustavo Menezes (United Kingdom) Matt Rao	Alpine A470	D	190	+14 Laps
7	LMP2	36	(France) Signatech Alpine Matmut	(France) Nicolas Lapierre (United States) Gustavo Menezes (United Kingdom) Matt Rao	Gibson GK428 4.2 L V8	D	190	+14 Laps
8	LMP2	13	(Switzerland) Vaillante Rebellion	(Switzerland) Mathias Beche (Denmark) David Heinemeier Hansson (Brazil) Pipo Derani	Oreca 07	D	190	+14 Laps
8	LMP2	13	(Switzerland) Vaillante Rebellion	(Switzerland) Mathias Beche (Denmark) David Heinemeier Hansson (Brazil) Pipo Derani	Gibson GK428 4.2 L V8	D	190	+14 Laps
9	LMP2	37	(China) Jackie Chan DC Racing	(United States) David Cheng (United Kingdom) Alex Brundle (France) Tristan Gommendy	Oreca 07	D	189	+15 Laps
9	LMP2	37	(China) Jackie Chan DC Racing	(United States) David Cheng (United Kingdom) Alex Brundle (France) Tristan Gommendy	Gibson GK428 4.2 L V8	D	189	+15 Laps
10	LMP2	26	(Russia) G-Drive Racing	(Russia) Roman Rusinov (France) Pierre Thiriet (United Kingdom) Ben Hanley	Oreca 07	D	188	+16 Laps
10	LMP2	26	(Russia) G-Drive Racing	(Russia) Roman Rusinov (France) Pierre Thiriet (United Kingdom) Ben Hanley	Gibson GK428 4.2 L V8	D	188	+16 Laps
11	LMP2	25	(China) CEFC Manor TRS Racing	(Mexico) Roberto González (Switzerland) Simon Trummer (Russia) Vitaly Petrov	Oreca 07	D	188	+16 Laps
11	LMP2	25	(China) CEFC Manor TRS Racing	(Mexico) Roberto González (Switzerland) Simon Trummer (Russia) Vitaly Petrov	Gibson GK428 4.2 L V8	D	188	+16 Laps
12	LMP2	28	(France) TDS Racing	(France) François Perrodo (France) Matthieu Vaxiviere (France) Emmanuel Collard	Oreca 07	D	188	+16 Laps
12	LMP2	28	(France) TDS Racing	(France) François Perrodo (France) Matthieu Vaxiviere (France) Emmanuel Collard	Gibson GK428 4.2 L V8	D	188	+16 Laps
13	LMP2	24	(China) CEFC Manor TRS Racing	(Thailand) Tor Graves (Switzerland) Jonathan Hirschi (Spain) Roberto Merhi	Oreca 07	D	183	+21 Laps
13	LMP2	24	(China) CEFC Manor TRS Racing	(Thailand) Tor Graves (Switzerland) Jonathan Hirschi (Spain) Roberto Merhi	Gibson GK428 4.2 L V8	D	183	+21 Laps
14	LMP1	4	(Austria) ByKolles Racing	(United Kingdom) Oliver Webb (Austria) Dominik Kraihamer (Italy) Marco Bonanomi	ENSO CLM P1/01	MI	182	+22 Laps
14	LMP1	4	(Austria) ByKolles Racing	(United Kingdom) Oliver Webb (Austria) Dominik Kraihamer (Italy) Marco Bonanomi	Nismo VRX30A 3.0 L Turbo V6	MI	182	+22 Laps
15	**LMGTE; Pro**	**51**	**(Italy) AF Corse**	**(United Kingdom) James Calado (Italy) Alessandro Pier Guidi**	**Ferrari 488 GTE**	MI	**179**	**+25 Laps**
15	**LMGTE; Pro**	**51**	**(Italy) AF Corse**	**(United Kingdom) James Calado (Italy) Alessandro Pier Guidi**	**Ferrari F154CB 3.9 L Turbo V8**	MI	**179**	**+25 Laps**
16	LMGTE; Pro	91	(Germany) Porsche GT Team	(Austria) Richard Lietz (France) Frédéric Makowiecki	Porsche 911 RSR	MI	179	+25 Laps
16	LMGTE; Pro	91	(Germany) Porsche GT Team	(Austria) Richard Lietz (France) Frédéric Makowiecki	Porsche 4.0 L Flat-6	MI	179	+25 Laps
17	LMGTE; Pro	92	(Germany) Porsche GT Team	(Denmark) Michael Christensen (France) Kévin Estre	Porsche 911 RSR	MI	179	+25 Laps
17	LMGTE; Pro	92	(Germany) Porsche GT Team	(Denmark) Michael Christensen (France) Kévin Estre	Porsche 4.0 L Flat-6	MI	179	+25 Laps
18	LMGTE; Pro	95	(United Kingdom) Aston Martin Racing	(Denmark) Nicki Thiim (Denmark) Marco Sørensen	Aston Martin V8 Vantage GTE	D	178	+26 Laps
18	LMGTE; Pro	95	(United Kingdom) Aston Martin Racing	(Denmark) Nicki Thiim (Denmark) Marco Sørensen	Aston Martin 4.5 L V8	D	178	+26 Laps
19	LMGTE; Pro	67	(United States) Ford Chip Ganassi Team UK	(United Kingdom) Andy Priaulx (United Kingdom) Harry Tincknell	Ford GT	MI	178	+26 Laps
19	LMGTE; Pro	67	(United States) Ford Chip Ganassi Team UK	(United Kingdom) Andy Priaulx (United Kingdom) Harry Tincknell	Ford EcoBoost 3.5 L Turbo V6	MI	178	+26 Laps
20	LMGTE; Pro	66	(United States) Ford Chip Ganassi Team UK	(Germany) Stefan Mücke (France) Olivier Pla	Ford GT	MI	178	+26 Laps
20	LMGTE; Pro	66	(United States) Ford Chip Ganassi Team UK	(Germany) Stefan Mücke (France) Olivier Pla	Ford EcoBoost 3.5 L Turbo V6	MI	178	+26 Laps
21	LMGTE; Pro	97	(United Kingdom) Aston Martin Racing	(United Kingdom) Darren Turner (United Kingdom) Jonathan Adam (Brazil) Daniel Serra	Aston Martin V8 Vantage GTE	D	177	+27 Laps
21	LMGTE; Pro	97	(United Kingdom) Aston Martin Racing	(United Kingdom) Darren Turner (United Kingdom) Jonathan Adam (Brazil) Daniel Serra	Aston Martin 4.5 L V8	D	177	+27 Laps
22	**LMGTE; Am**	**77**	**(Germany) Dempsey-Proton Racing**	**(Germany) Christian Ried (Italy) Matteo Cairoli (Germany) Marvin Dienst**	**Porsche 911 RSR**	D	**175**	**+29 Laps**
22	**LMGTE; Am**	**77**	**(Germany) Dempsey-Proton Racing**	**(Germany) Christian Ried (Italy) Matteo Cairoli (Germany) Marvin Dienst**	**Porsche 4.0 L Flat-6**	D	**175**	**+29 Laps**
23	LMGTE; Am	54	(Switzerland) Spirit of Race	(Switzerland) Thomas Flohr (Italy) Francesco Castellacci (Spain) Miguel Molina	Ferrari 488 GTE	MI	175	+29 Laps
23	LMGTE; Am	54	(Switzerland) Spirit of Race	(Switzerland) Thomas Flohr (Italy) Francesco Castellacci (Spain) Miguel Molina	Ferrari F154CB 3.9 L Turbo V8	MI	175	+29 Laps
24	LMGTE; Am	98	(United Kingdom) Aston Martin Racing	(Canada) Paul Dalla Lana (Portugal) Pedro Lamy (Austria) Mathias Lauda	Aston Martin V8 Vantage GTE	D	174	+30 Laps
24	LMGTE; Am	98	(United Kingdom) Aston Martin Racing	(Canada) Paul Dalla Lana (Portugal) Pedro Lamy (Austria) Mathias Lauda	Aston Martin 4.5 L V8	D	174	+30 Laps
25	LMGTE; Pro	71	(Italy) AF Corse	(Italy) Davide Rigon (Finland) Toni Vilander	Ferrari 488 GTE	MI	174	+30 Laps
25	LMGTE; Pro	71	(Italy) AF Corse	(Italy) Davide Rigon (Finland) Toni Vilander	Ferrari F154CB 3.9 L Turbo V8	MI	174	+30 Laps
26	LMGTE; Am	61	(Singapore) Clearwater Racing	(Singapore) Weng Sun Mok (Japan) Keita Sawa (Republic of Ireland) Matt Griffin	Ferrari 488 GTE	MI	173	+31 Laps
26	LMGTE; Am	61	(Singapore) Clearwater Racing	(Singapore) Weng Sun Mok (Japan) Keita Sawa (Republic of Ireland) Matt Griffin	Ferrari F154CB 3.9 L Turbo V8	MI	173	+31 Laps
27	LMGTE; Am	86	(United Kingdom) Gulf Racing UK	(United Kingdom) Michael Wainwright (United Kingdom) Ben Barker (Australia) Nick Foster	Porsche 911 RSR	D	173	+31 Laps
27	LMGTE; Am	86	(United Kingdom) Gulf Racing UK	(United Kingdom) Michael Wainwright (United Kingdom) Ben Barker (Australia) Nick Foster	Porsche 4.0 L Flat-6	D	173	+31 Laps
DNF	LMP2	34	(United Kingdom) Tockwith Motorsports	(United Kingdom) Nigel Moore (United Kingdom) Philip Hanson	Ligier JS P217	D	112	
DNF	LMP2	34	(United Kingdom) Tockwith Motorsports	(United Kingdom) Nigel Moore (United Kingdom) Philip Hanson	Gibson GK428 4.2 L V8	D	112	
DNF	LMP2	35	(France) Signatech Alpine Matmut	(France) Pierre Ragues (Brazil) André Negrão (France) Nelson Panciatici	Alpine A470	D	61	
DNF	LMP2	35	(France) Signatech Alpine Matmut	(France) Pierre Ragues (Brazil) André Negrão (France) Nelson Panciatici	Gibson GK428 4.2 L V8	D	61	
