= Toyota GR Super Sport Concept =

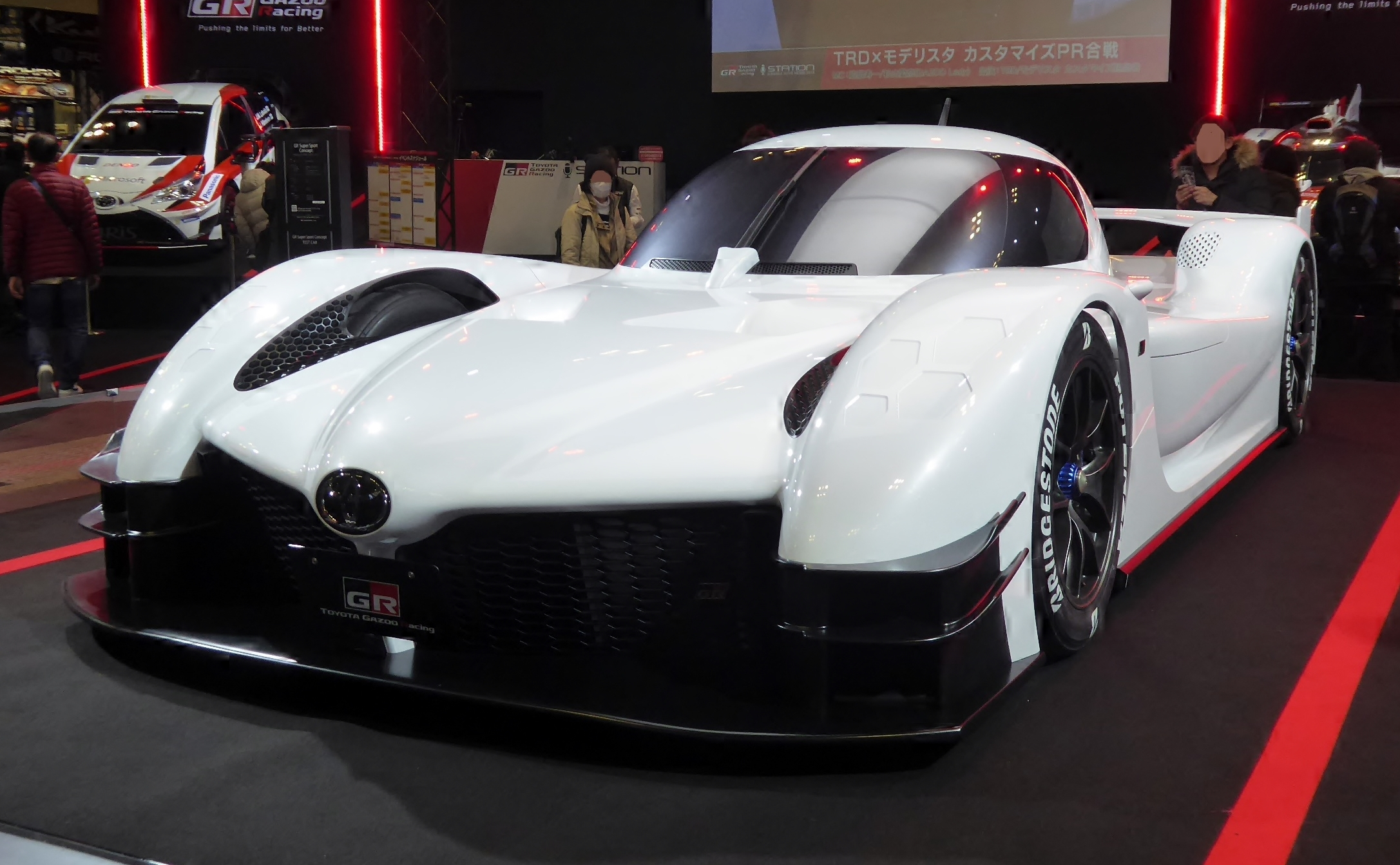
- The GR Super Sport Concept on display at the 2018 Osaka Auto Messe

Overview
- Manufacturer: Toyota
- Production: 2018

Body and chassis
- Class: Concept car
- Body style: Canopy coupe
- Layout: Rear mid-engine, four-wheel-drive
- Related: Toyota TS050 Hybrid; Toyota GR010 Hybrid

Powertrain
- Engine: Petrol hybrid: 2.4 L direct-injected twin-turbo V6
- Power output: 735 kW (986 hp; 1,000 PS) (combined system output)

The Toyota GR Super Sport Concept is a 2018 two-seat concept sports car developed by Toyota under the Gazoo Racing brand based on the Toyota TS050 Hybrid.

== History ==
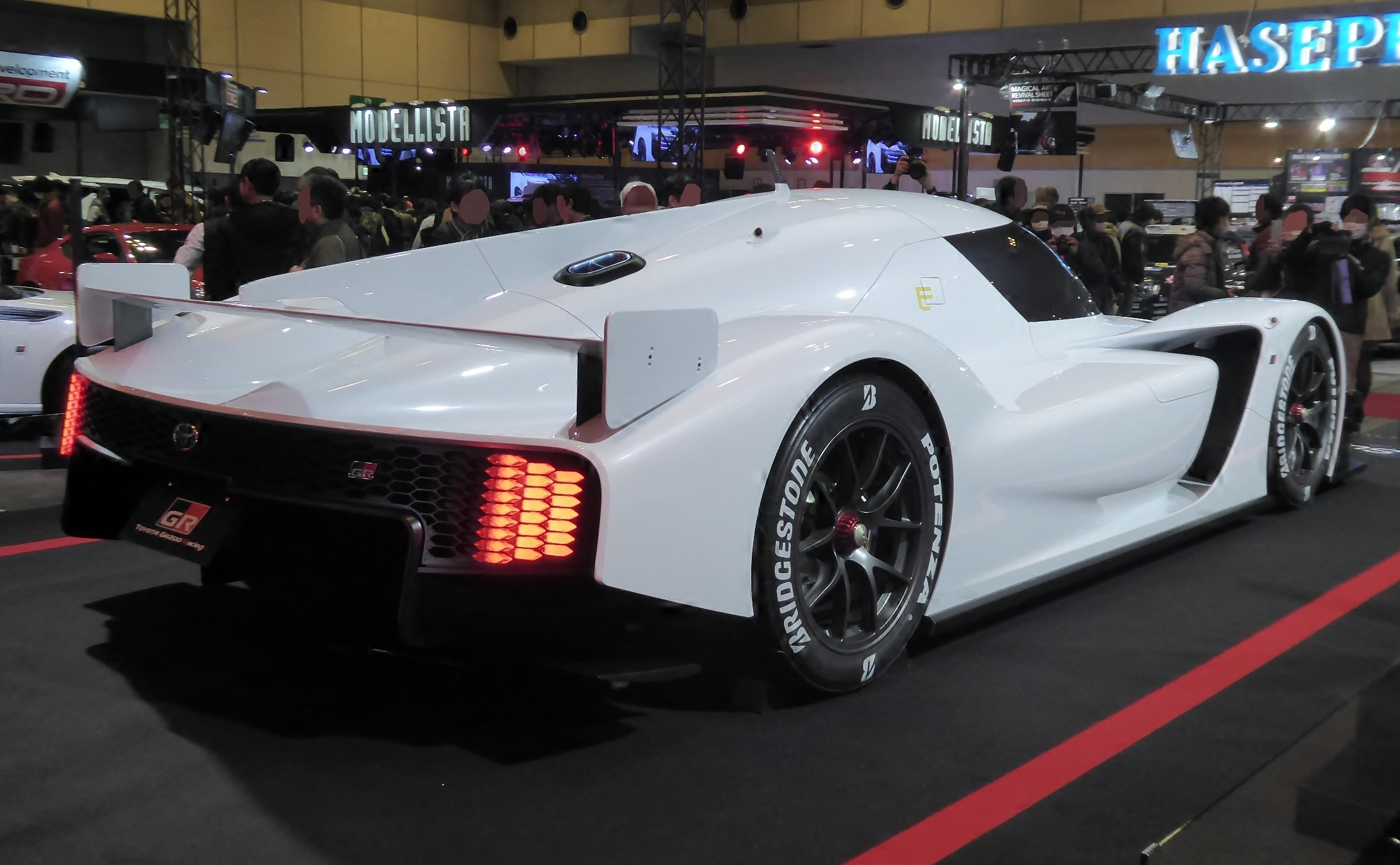
Rear view

Toyota teased the GR Super Sport in a teaser image in December 2017, before being first presented and unveiled to the public in January 2018 at the Tokyo Auto Salon, as a sports car.

In June 2019, a series of test mule prototypes went into test driving in the Fuji Speedway in Oyama Japan. In September 2020 at the 2020 24 Hours of Le Mans endurance race, Toyota showed off the prototype of the GR Super Sport featuring an open top variant, side mirrors, and updated fenders and an updated body styling from the 2018 concept.

A series of production runs for street-legal vehicles was planned in small numbers. This was later reportedly cancelled in August 2021 after a prototype caught in a severe crash and catch on fire at the Fuji Speedway after the Tokyo 2020 Summer Olympics ended from unconfirmed reports.

In September 2021, Toyota has not made an official statement about canceling or halting the GR Super Sport nearly a month after it crashed and caught fire at the Fuji Speedway.

In December 2021, Rob Leupen, a team director of Toyota's LMH racing program, stated that "Due to the entire energy transition from fossil fuels to more electrical support, the GR Super Sport has been pushed into the background, The GR010's we have now are indeed based on ideas for a street-legal hypercar, but those street-legal cars have been pushed back.” indicating that the GR Super Sport is used as an internal project to be used for development purposes.

== Overview ==
At the front is a large air intake that guides air through channels behind the front wheels in the vehicle's sides. These aerodynamic features are based on the TS050 Hybrid Le Mans Prototype.

The car's 2.4-litre direct-injected twin-turbo V6 engine and the Toyota Hybrid System-Racing (THS-R) hybrid system were taken directly from the TS050. It is claimed to produce 735 kW (986 hp; 1,000 PS). The car has 18-inch rims and 330/710R18 Bridgestone slick tires.

== Motorsport ==
In 2018, the FIA and ACO confirmed that the existing LMP1 class would be replaced by the Hypercar class for the 2021 season. With this class, the FIA World Endurance Championship would feature sports cars designed to look more like road vehicles than previous Le Mans prototypes. Toyota is among the manufacturers involved in the creation of the category.

The GR Super Sport Concept was considered by the company to be a preview of vehicles in the Hypercar class.

== GR010 Hybrid ==
The GR010 Hybrid is a sports racing car which influenced by the GR Super Sport Concept, unveiled on 15 January 2021. The GR010 is powered by a combination of a 3.5-litre twin-turbo V6 engine and a hybrid system that generates upwards of 500 kW (671 hp; 680 PS) with a 4WD system, other than the 2.4-litre V6 and hybrid setup that powers the previous TS050 Hybrid and the GR Super Sport Concept. To stay under the LMH regulations, the GR010 can limit how much power the internal-combustion engine generates, depending on how much hybrid boost is being used at any given moment. Compared to the TS050, the GR010 is 250 mm (9.8 in) longer, 100 mm (3.9 in) wider, 100 mm (3.9 in) higher and weighs more at 1,040 kg (2,293 lb). The TS050 weighs 878 kg (1,936 lb).
