= 2017 6 Hours of Shanghai =

Sports car endurance race held at Shanghai International Circuit

Track map of the Shanghai International Circuit

The 2017 6 Hours of Shanghai was an endurance sports car racing event held at the Shanghai International Circuit, Shanghai, China on 3—5 November 2017, and served as the eighth race of the 2017 FIA World Endurance Championship. Toyota's Anthony Davidson, Sébastien Buemi and Kazuki Nakajima won the race driving the No. 8 Toyota TS050 Hybrid.

== Qualifying ==
=== Qualifying result ===
Performance done during the qualifying session (Pole position in Class is in bold)
Pos	Class	N°	Team	Driver	Times	Grid A
**1**	**LMP1**	**7**	**(Japan) Toyota Gazoo Racing**	**(Japan) Kamui Kobayashi**	**1 min 42 s 832**	**1**
2	LMP1	1	(Germany) Porsche LMP Team	(United Kingdom) Nick Tandy	1 min 43 s 72	2
3	LMP1	8	(Japan) Toyota Gazoo Racing	(United Kingdom) Anthony Davidson	1 min 43 s 445	3
4	LMP1	2	(Germany) Porsche LMP Team	(New Zealand) Brendon Hartley	1 min 43 s 497	4
**5**	**LMP2**	**31**	**(Switzerland) Vaillante Rebellion**	**(Brazil) Bruno Senna**	**1 min 49 s 217**	**5**
6	LMP2	26	(Russia) G-Drive Racing	(France) Léo Roussel	1 min 49 s 472	6
7	LMP2	13	(Switzerland) Vaillante Rebellion	(Brazil) Nelson Piquet Jr.	1 min 49 s 694	7
8	LMP2	38	(China) Jackie Chan DC Racing	(United Kingdom) Oliver Jarvis	1 min 49 s 743	8
9	LMP2	36	(France) Signatech Alpine Matmut	(France) Nicolas Lapierre	1 min 49 s 883	9
10	LMP2	24	(China) CEFC Manor TRS Racing	(France) Jean-Éric Vergne	1 min 50 s 417	10
11	LMP2	25	(China) CEFC Manor TRS Racing	(Russia) Vitaly Petrov	1 min 50 s 727	11
12	LMP2	28	(France) TDS Racing	(France) Matthieu Vaxiviere	1 min 51 s 077	12
13	LMP2	37	(China) Jackie Chan DC Racing	(France) Tristan Gommendy	1 min 51s 171	13
**14**	**LMGTE Pro**	**95**	**(United Kingdom) Aston Martin Racing**	**(Denmark) Nicki Thiim**	**1 min 59 s 697**	**14**
15	LMGTE Pro	92	(Germany) Porsche GT Team	(Denmark) Michael Christensen	1 min 59 s 916	15
16	LMGTE Pro	51	(Italy) AF Corse	(United Kingdom) James Calado	2 min 00 s 247	16
17	LMGTE Pro	67	(United States) Ford Chip Ganassi Team UK	(United Kingdom) Harry Tincknell	2 min 00 s 299	17
18	LMGTE Pro	66	(United States) Ford Chip Ganassi Team UK	(France) Olivier Pla	2 min 00 s 332	18
19	LMGTE Pro	71	(Italy) AF Corse	(Italy) Davide Rigon	2 min 00 s 754	19
20	LMGTE Pro	91	(Germany) Porsche GT Team	(Austria) Richard Lietz	2 min 00 s 783	20
21	LMGTE Pro	97	(United Kingdom) Aston Martin Racing	(United Kingdom) Jonathan Adam	2 min 01 s 141	21
**22**	**LMGTE Am**	**98**	**(United Kingdom) Aston Martin Racing**	**(Portugal) Pedro Lamy**	**2 min 02 s 357**	**22**
23	LMGTE Am	77	(Germany) Dempsey-Proton Racing	(Italy) Matteo Cairoli	2 min 02 s 765	23
24	LMGTE Am	54	(Switzerland) Spirit of Race	(Spain) Miguel Molina	2 min 03 s 062	24
25	LMGTE Am	61	(Singapore) Clearwater Racing	(Republic of Ireland) Matt Griffin	2 min 03 s 495	25
26	LMGTE Am	86	(United Kingdom) Gulf Racing UK	(United Kingdom) Ben Barker	2 min 17 s 037	26

== Race ==
=== Race result ===
Class winners are denoted with a yellow background.

Pos	Class	No	Team	Drivers	Chassis	Tyre	Laps	Time/Retired
Pos	Class	No	Team	Drivers	Engine	Tyre	Laps	Time/Retired
1	LMP1	8	(Japan) Toyota Gazoo Racing	(United Kingdom) Anthony Davidson (Switzerland) Sébastien Buemi (Japan) Kazuki Nakajima	Toyota TS050 Hybrid	MI	195	6:00:40.777
1	LMP1	8	(Japan) Toyota Gazoo Racing	(United Kingdom) Anthony Davidson (Switzerland) Sébastien Buemi (Japan) Kazuki Nakajima	Toyota 2.4 L Turbo V6	MI	195	6:00:40.777
2	LMP1	2	(Germany) Porsche LMP Team	(Germany) Timo Bernhard (New Zealand) Earl Bamber (New Zealand) Brendon Hartley	Porsche 919 Hybrid	MI	194	+1 Lap
2	LMP1	2	(Germany) Porsche LMP Team	(Germany) Timo Bernhard (New Zealand) Earl Bamber (New Zealand) Brendon Hartley	Porsche 2.0 L Turbo V4	MI	194	+1 Lap
3	LMP1	1	(Germany) Porsche LMP Team	(Switzerland) Neel Jani (United Kingdom) Nick Tandy (Germany) André Lotterer	Porsche 919 Hybrid	MI	194	+1 Lap
3	LMP1	1	(Germany) Porsche LMP Team	(Switzerland) Neel Jani (United Kingdom) Nick Tandy (Germany) André Lotterer	Porsche 2.0 L Turbo V4	MI	194	+1 Lap
4	LMP1	7	(Japan) Toyota Gazoo Racing	(United Kingdom) Mike Conway (Japan) Kamui Kobayashi (Argentina) José María López	Toyota TS050 Hybrid	MI	188	+7 Laps
4	LMP1	7	(Japan) Toyota Gazoo Racing	(United Kingdom) Mike Conway (Japan) Kamui Kobayashi (Argentina) José María López	Toyota 2.4 L Turbo V6	MI	188	+7 Laps
5	LMP2	31	(Switzerland) Vaillante Rebellion	(France) Julien Canal (France) Nicolas Prost (Brazil) Bruno Senna	Oreca 07	D	183	+12 Laps
5	LMP2	31	(Switzerland) Vaillante Rebellion	(France) Julien Canal (France) Nicolas Prost (Brazil) Bruno Senna	Gibson GK428 4.2 L V8	D	183	+12 Laps
6	LMP2	36	(France) Signatech Alpine Matmut	(France) Nicolas Lapierre (United States) Gustavo Menezes (Brazil) André Negrão	Alpine A470	D	183	+12 Laps
6	LMP2	36	(France) Signatech Alpine Matmut	(France) Nicolas Lapierre (United States) Gustavo Menezes (Brazil) André Negrão	Gibson GK428 4.2 L V8	D	183	+12 Laps
7	LMP2	13	(Switzerland) Vaillante Rebellion	(Switzerland) Mathias Beche (Denmark) David Heinemeier Hansson (Brazil) Nelson Piquet Jr.	Oreca 07	D	182	+13 Laps
7	LMP2	13	(Switzerland) Vaillante Rebellion	(Switzerland) Mathias Beche (Denmark) David Heinemeier Hansson (Brazil) Nelson Piquet Jr.	Gibson GK428 4.2 L V8	D	182	+13 Laps
8	LMP2	38	(China) Jackie Chan DC Racing	(China) Ho-Pin Tung (United Kingdom) Oliver Jarvis (France) Thomas Laurent	Oreca 07	D	182	+13 Laps
8	LMP2	38	(China) Jackie Chan DC Racing	(China) Ho-Pin Tung (United Kingdom) Oliver Jarvis (France) Thomas Laurent	Gibson GK428 4.2 L V8	D	182	+13 Laps
9	LMP2	25	(China) CEFC Manor TRS Racing	(Mexico) Roberto González (Switzerland) Simon Trummer (Russia) Vitaly Petrov	Oreca 07	D	182	+13 Laps
9	LMP2	25	(China) CEFC Manor TRS Racing	(Mexico) Roberto González (Switzerland) Simon Trummer (Russia) Vitaly Petrov	Gibson GK428 4.2 L V8	D	182	+13 Laps
10	LMP2	28	(France) TDS Racing	(France) François Perrodo (France) Matthieu Vaxiviere (France) Emmanuel Collard	Oreca 07	D	182	+13 Laps
10	LMP2	28	(France) TDS Racing	(France) François Perrodo (France) Matthieu Vaxiviere (France) Emmanuel Collard	Gibson GK428 4.2 L V8	D	182	+13 Laps
11	LMP2	26	(Russia) G-Drive Racing	(Russia) Roman Rusinov (France) Léo Roussel (Switzerland) Nico Müller	Oreca 07	D	181	+14 Laps
11	LMP2	26	(Russia) G-Drive Racing	(Russia) Roman Rusinov (France) Léo Roussel (Switzerland) Nico Müller	Gibson GK428 4.2 L V8	D	181	+14 Laps
12	LMP2	37	(China) Jackie Chan DC Racing	(China) David Cheng (United Kingdom) Alex Brundle (France) Tristan Gommendy	Oreca 07	D	181	+14 Laps
12	LMP2	37	(China) Jackie Chan DC Racing	(China) David Cheng (United Kingdom) Alex Brundle (France) Tristan Gommendy	Gibson GK428 4.2 L V8	D	181	+14 Laps
13	LMP2	24	(China) CEFC Manor TRS Racing	(United Kingdom) Matt Rao (United Kingdom) Ben Hanley (France) Jean-Éric Vergne	Oreca 07	D	181	+14 Laps
13	LMP2	24	(China) CEFC Manor TRS Racing	(United Kingdom) Matt Rao (United Kingdom) Ben Hanley (France) Jean-Éric Vergne	Gibson GK428 4.2 L V8	D	181	+14 Laps
14	LMGTE; Pro	67	(United States) Ford Chip Ganassi Team UK	(United Kingdom) Andy Priaulx (United Kingdom) Harry Tincknell	Ford GT	MI	170	+25 Laps
14	LMGTE; Pro	67	(United States) Ford Chip Ganassi Team UK	(United Kingdom) Andy Priaulx (United Kingdom) Harry Tincknell	Ford EcoBoost 3.5 L Turbo V6	MI	170	+25 Laps
15	LMGTE; Pro	91	(Germany) Porsche GT Team	(Austria) Richard Lietz (France) Frédéric Makowiecki	Porsche 911 RSR	MI	170	+25 Laps
15	LMGTE; Pro	91	(Germany) Porsche GT Team	(Austria) Richard Lietz (France) Frédéric Makowiecki	Porsche 4.0 L Flat-6	MI	170	+25 Laps
16	LMGTE; Pro	51	(Italy) AF Corse	(United Kingdom) James Calado (Italy) Alessandro Pier Guidi	Ferrari 488 GTE	MI	170	+25 Laps
16	LMGTE; Pro	51	(Italy) AF Corse	(United Kingdom) James Calado (Italy) Alessandro Pier Guidi	Ferrari F154CB 3.9 L Turbo V8	MI	170	+25 Laps
17	LMGTE; Pro	66	(United States) Ford Chip Ganassi Team UK	(Germany) Stefan Mücke (France) Olivier Pla	Ford GT	MI	170	+25 Laps
17	LMGTE; Pro	66	(United States) Ford Chip Ganassi Team UK	(Germany) Stefan Mücke (France) Olivier Pla	Ford EcoBoost 3.5 L Turbo V6	MI	170	+25 Laps
18	LMGTE; Pro	95	(United Kingdom) Aston Martin Racing	(Denmark) Nicki Thiim (Denmark) Marco Sørensen	Aston Martin V8 Vantage GTE	D	170	+25 Laps
18	LMGTE; Pro	95	(United Kingdom) Aston Martin Racing	(Denmark) Nicki Thiim (Denmark) Marco Sørensen	Aston Martin 4.5 L V8	D	170	+25 Laps
19	LMGTE; Pro	71	(Italy) AF Corse	(Italy) Davide Rigon (United Kingdom) Sam Bird	Ferrari 488 GTE	MI	170	+25 Laps
19	LMGTE; Pro	71	(Italy) AF Corse	(Italy) Davide Rigon (United Kingdom) Sam Bird	Ferrari F154CB 3.9 L Turbo V8	MI	170	+25 Laps
20	LMGTE; Pro	97	(United Kingdom) Aston Martin Racing	(United Kingdom) Darren Turner (United Kingdom) Jonathan Adam	Aston Martin V8 Vantage GTE	D	170	+25 Laps
20	LMGTE; Pro	97	(United Kingdom) Aston Martin Racing	(United Kingdom) Darren Turner (United Kingdom) Jonathan Adam	Aston Martin 4.5 L V8	D	170	+25 Laps
21	LMGTE; Am	98	(United Kingdom) Aston Martin Racing	(Canada) Paul Dalla Lana (Portugal) Pedro Lamy (Austria) Mathias Lauda	Aston Martin V8 Vantage GTE	D	166	+29 Laps
21	LMGTE; Am	98	(United Kingdom) Aston Martin Racing	(Canada) Paul Dalla Lana (Portugal) Pedro Lamy (Austria) Mathias Lauda	Aston Martin 4.5 L V8	D	166	+29 Laps
22	LMGTE; Am	86	(United Kingdom) Gulf Racing UK	(United Arab Emirates) Khaled Al Qubaisi (United Kingdom) Ben Barker (Australia) Nick Foster	Porsche 911 RSR	D	165	+30 Laps
22	LMGTE; Am	86	(United Kingdom) Gulf Racing UK	(United Arab Emirates) Khaled Al Qubaisi (United Kingdom) Ben Barker (Australia) Nick Foster	Porsche 4.0 L Flat-6	D	165	+30 Laps
23	LMGTE; Am	77	(Germany) Dempsey-Proton Racing	(Germany) Christian Ried (Italy) Matteo Cairoli (Germany) Marvin Dienst	Porsche 911 RSR	D	164	+31 Laps
23	LMGTE; Am	77	(Germany) Dempsey-Proton Racing	(Germany) Christian Ried (Italy) Matteo Cairoli (Germany) Marvin Dienst	Porsche 4.0 L Flat-6	D	164	+31 Laps
24	LMGTE; Am	61	(Singapore) Clearwater Racing	(Singapore) Weng Sun Mok (Japan) Keita Sawa (Republic of Ireland) Matt Griffin	Ferrari 488 GTE	MI	158	+37 Laps
24	LMGTE; Am	61	(Singapore) Clearwater Racing	(Singapore) Weng Sun Mok (Japan) Keita Sawa (Republic of Ireland) Matt Griffin	Ferrari F154CB 3.9 L Turbo V8	MI	158	+37 Laps
NC	LMGTE; Pro	92	(Germany) Porsche GT Team	(Denmark) Michael Christensen (France) Kévin Estre	Porsche 911 RSR	MI	65	
NC	LMGTE; Pro	92	(Germany) Porsche GT Team	(Denmark) Michael Christensen (France) Kévin Estre	Porsche 4.0 L Flat-6	MI	65	
NC	LMGTE; Am	54	(Switzerland) Spirit of Race	(Switzerland) Thomas Flohr (Italy) Francesco Castellacci (Spain) Miguel Molina	Ferrari 488 GTE	MI	37	
NC	LMGTE; Am	54	(Switzerland) Spirit of Race	(Switzerland) Thomas Flohr (Italy) Francesco Castellacci (Spain) Miguel Molina	Ferrari F154CB 3.9 L Turbo V8	MI	37	
