= 2017 6 Hours of Spa-Francorchamps =

Sports car endurance race held at Spa-Francorchamps

Layout of the Circuit de Spa-Francorchamps

The 2017 WEC 6 Hours of Spa-Francorchamps, formally the WEC 6 Heures de Spa-Francorchamps, was an endurance sports car racing event held at the Circuit de Spa-Francorchamps, Stavelot, Belgium on 4–6 May 2017. It was the second race of the 2017 FIA World Endurance Championship, and was the sixth running of the event as part of the championship. The event was won by the #8 Toyota Gazoo Racing Toyota TS050 Hybrid

== Qualifying ==
=== Qualifying results ===
Pole position winners in each class are marked in bold.

Pos	Class	Team	Average Time	Gap	Grid
1	**LMP1**	**No. 1 Porsche LMP Team**	**1:54.097**	—	**1**
2	LMP1	No. 7 Toyota Gazoo Racing	1:54.693	+0.596	2
3	LMP1	No. 9 Toyota Gazoo Racing	1:54.701	+0.604	3
4	LMP1	No. 8 Toyota Gazoo Racing	1:54.907	+0.810	4
5	LMP1	No. 2 Porsche LMP Team	1:55.440	+1.343	5
6	**LMP2**	**No. 26 G-Drive Racing**	**2:02.601**	**+8.504**	**6**
7	LMP2	No. 36 Signatech Alpine Matmut	2:02.624	+8.527	7
8	LMP2	No. 35 Signatech Alpine Matmut	2:02.629	+8.532	8
9	LMP2	No. 24 CEFC Manor TRS Racing	2:02.632	+8.535	9
10	LMP2	No. 13 Vaillante Rebellion	2:03.619	+9.522	10
11	LMP1	No. 4 ByKolles Racing Team	2:03.827	+9.730	11
12	LMP2	No. 34 Tockwith Motorsports	2:04.176	+10.079	12
13	LMP2	No. 28 TDS Racing	2:05.058	+10.961	13
14	LMP2	No. 37 Jackie Chan DC Racing	2:05.421	+11.324	14
15	LMP2	No. 31 Vaillante Rebellion	2:05.614	+11.517	15
16	LMP2	No. 38 Jackie Chan DC Racing	2:14.220	+20.123	16
17	**LMGTE Pro**	**No. 71 AF Corse**	**2:15.017**	**+20.920**	**17**
18	LMGTE Pro	No. 66 Ford Chip Ganassi Team UK	2:15.418	+21.321	18
19	LMGTE Pro	No. 67 Ford Chip Ganassi Team UK	2:15.565	+21.468	19
20	LMGTE Pro	No. 51 AF Corse	2:15.765	+21.668	20
21	LMGTE Pro	No. 91 Porsche GT Team	2:16.862	+22.765	21
22	LMGTE Pro	No. 92 Porsche GT Team	2:17.010	+22.913	22
23	LMGTE Pro	No. 95 Aston Martin Racing	2:17.156	+23.059	23
24	LMGTE Pro	No. 97 Aston Martin Racing	2:17.640	+23.543	24
25	**LMGTE Am**	**No. 98 Aston Martin Racing**	**2:18.659**	**+24.562**	**25**
26	LMGTE Am	No. 77 Dempsey-Proton Racing	2:19.065	+24.968	26
27	LMGTE Am	No. 54 Spirit of Race	2:19.658	+25.561	27
28	LMGTE Am	No. 61 Clearwater Racing	2:20.915	+26.818	28
29	LMGTE Am	No. 86 Gulf Racing	2:22.120	+28.023	29
30	LMP2	No. 25 CEFC Manor TRS Racing	No Time	—	30

== Race ==
=== Race result ===
The minimum number of laps for classification (70% of the overall winning car's race distance) was 122 laps. Class winners in bold.

Pos	Class	No	Team	Drivers	Chassis	Tyre	Laps	Time/Retired
Pos	Class	No	Team	Drivers	Engine	Tyre	Laps	Time/Retired
1	**LMP1**	**8**	**(Japan) Toyota Gazoo Racing**	**(United Kingdom) Anthony Davidson (Switzerland) Sébastien Buemi (Japan) Kazuki Nakajima**	**Toyota TS050 Hybrid**	MI	**173**	**06:00:11.490**
1	**LMP1**	**8**	**(Japan) Toyota Gazoo Racing**	**(United Kingdom) Anthony Davidson (Switzerland) Sébastien Buemi (Japan) Kazuki Nakajima**	**Toyota 2.4 L Turbo V6**	MI	**173**	**06:00:11.490**
2	LMP1	7	(Japan) Toyota Gazoo Racing	(United Kingdom) Mike Conway (Japan) Kamui Kobayashi	Toyota TS050 Hybrid	MI	173	+1.992
2	LMP1	7	(Japan) Toyota Gazoo Racing	(United Kingdom) Mike Conway (Japan) Kamui Kobayashi	Toyota 2.4 L Turbo V6	MI	173	+1.992
3	LMP1	2	(Germany) Porsche LMP Team	(Germany) Timo Bernhard (New Zealand) Earl Bamber (New Zealand) Brendon Hartley	Porsche 919 Hybrid	MI	173	+35.283
3	LMP1	2	(Germany) Porsche LMP Team	(Germany) Timo Bernhard (New Zealand) Earl Bamber (New Zealand) Brendon Hartley	Porsche 2.0 L Turbo V4	MI	173	+35.283
4	LMP1	1	(Germany) Porsche LMP Team	(Switzerland) Neel Jani (United Kingdom) Nick Tandy (Germany) André Lotterer	Porsche 919 Hybrid	MI	173	+1:25.438
4	LMP1	1	(Germany) Porsche LMP Team	(Switzerland) Neel Jani (United Kingdom) Nick Tandy (Germany) André Lotterer	Porsche 2.0 L Turbo V4	MI	173	+1:25.438
5	LMP1	9	(Japan) Toyota Gazoo Racing	(France) Stéphane Sarrazin (Japan) Yuji Kunimoto (France) Nicolas Lapierre	Toyota TS050 Hybrid	MI	171	+2 Laps
5	LMP1	9	(Japan) Toyota Gazoo Racing	(France) Stéphane Sarrazin (Japan) Yuji Kunimoto (France) Nicolas Lapierre	Toyota 2.4 L Turbo V6	MI	171	+2 Laps
6	LMP1	4	(Austria) ByKolles Racing Team	(United Kingdom) Oliver Webb (Austria) Dominik Kraihamer (United Kingdom) James Rossiter	ENSO CLM P1/01	MI	161	+12 Laps
6	LMP1	4	(Austria) ByKolles Racing Team	(United Kingdom) Oliver Webb (Austria) Dominik Kraihamer (United Kingdom) James Rossiter	Nismo VRX30A 3.0 L Turbo V6	MI	161	+12 Laps
7	**LMP2**	**26**	**(Russia) G-Drive Racing**	**(Russia) Roman Rusinov (France) Pierre Thiriet (United Kingdom) Alex Lynn**	**Oreca 07**	D	**160**	**+13 Laps**
7	**LMP2**	**26**	**(Russia) G-Drive Racing**	**(Russia) Roman Rusinov (France) Pierre Thiriet (United Kingdom) Alex Lynn**	**Gibson GK428 4.2 L V8**	D	**160**	**+13 Laps**
8	LMP2	31	(Switzerland) Vaillante Rebellion	(France) Julien Canal (France) Nicolas Prost (Brazil) Bruno Senna	Oreca 07	D	160	+13 Laps
8	LMP2	31	(Switzerland) Vaillante Rebellion	(France) Julien Canal (France) Nicolas Prost (Brazil) Bruno Senna	Gibson GK428 4.2 L V8	D	160	+13 Laps
9	LMP2	38	(China) Jackie Chan DC Racing	(Netherlands) Ho-Pin Tung (United Kingdom) Oliver Jarvis (France) Thomas Laurent	Oreca 07	D	160	+13 Laps
9	LMP2	38	(China) Jackie Chan DC Racing	(Netherlands) Ho-Pin Tung (United Kingdom) Oliver Jarvis (France) Thomas Laurent	Gibson GK428 4.2 L V8	D	160	+13 Laps
10	LMP2	13	(Switzerland) Vaillante Rebellion	(Switzerland) Mathias Beche (Denmark) David Heinemeier Hansson (Brazil) Nelson Piquet Jr.	Oreca 07	D	159	+14 Laps
10	LMP2	13	(Switzerland) Vaillante Rebellion	(Switzerland) Mathias Beche (Denmark) David Heinemeier Hansson (Brazil) Nelson Piquet Jr.	Gibson GK428 4.2 L V8	D	159	+14 Laps
11	LMP2	36	(France) Signatech Alpine Matmut	(France) Romain Dumas (United States) Gustavo Menezes (United Kingdom) Matt Rao	Alpine A470	D	159	+14 Laps
11	LMP2	36	(France) Signatech Alpine Matmut	(France) Romain Dumas (United States) Gustavo Menezes (United Kingdom) Matt Rao	Gibson GK428 4.2 L V8	D	159	+14 Laps
12	LMP2	35	(France) Signatech Alpine Matmut	(France) Pierre Ragues (Brazil) André Negrão (France) Nelson Panciatici	Alpine A470	D	158	+15 Laps
12	LMP2	35	(France) Signatech Alpine Matmut	(France) Pierre Ragues (Brazil) André Negrão (France) Nelson Panciatici	Gibson GK428 4.2 L V8	D	158	+15 Laps
13	LMP2	24	(China) CEFC Manor TRS Racing	(Thailand) Tor Graves (Switzerland) Jonathan Hirschi (France) Jean-Éric Vergne	Oreca 07	D	158	+15 Laps
13	LMP2	24	(China) CEFC Manor TRS Racing	(Thailand) Tor Graves (Switzerland) Jonathan Hirschi (France) Jean-Éric Vergne	Gibson GK428 4.2 L V8	D	158	+15 Laps
14	LMP2	25	(China) CEFC Manor TRS Racing	(Mexico) Roberto González (Switzerland) Simon Trummer (Russia) Vitaly Petrov	Oreca 07	D	158	+15 Laps
14	LMP2	25	(China) CEFC Manor TRS Racing	(Mexico) Roberto González (Switzerland) Simon Trummer (Russia) Vitaly Petrov	Gibson GK428 4.2 L V8	D	158	+15 Laps
15	LMP2	28	(France) TDS Racing	(France) François Perrodo (United Kingdom) Ben Hanley (France) Emmanuel Collard	Oreca 07	D	158	+15 Laps
15	LMP2	28	(France) TDS Racing	(France) François Perrodo (United Kingdom) Ben Hanley (France) Emmanuel Collard	Gibson GK428 4.2 L V8	D	158	+15 Laps
16	LMP2	37	(China) Jackie Chan DC Racing	(United States) David Cheng (United Kingdom) Alex Brundle (France) Tristan Gommendy	Oreca 07	D	156	+17 Laps
16	LMP2	37	(China) Jackie Chan DC Racing	(United States) David Cheng (United Kingdom) Alex Brundle (France) Tristan Gommendy	Gibson GK428 4.2 L V8	D	156	+17 Laps
17	**LMGTE; Pro**	**71**	**(Italy) AF Corse**	**(Italy) Davide Rigon (United Kingdom) Sam Bird**	**Ferrari 488 GTE**	MI	**151**	**+22 Laps**
17	**LMGTE; Pro**	**71**	**(Italy) AF Corse**	**(Italy) Davide Rigon (United Kingdom) Sam Bird**	**Ferrari F154CB 3.9 L Turbo V8**	MI	**151**	**+22 Laps**
18	LMGTE; Pro	51	(Italy) AF Corse	(United Kingdom) James Calado (Italy) Alessandro Pier Guidi	Ferrari 488 GTE	MI	150	+23 Laps
18	LMGTE; Pro	51	(Italy) AF Corse	(United Kingdom) James Calado (Italy) Alessandro Pier Guidi	Ferrari F154CB 3.9 L Turbo V8	MI	150	+23 Laps
19	LMGTE; Pro	66	(United States) Ford Chip Ganassi Team UK	(Germany) Stefan Mücke (France) Olivier Pla (United States) Billy Johnson	Ford GT	MI	150	+23 Laps
19	LMGTE; Pro	66	(United States) Ford Chip Ganassi Team UK	(Germany) Stefan Mücke (France) Olivier Pla (United States) Billy Johnson	Ford EcoBoost 3.5 L Turbo V6	MI	150	+23 Laps
20	LMGTE; Pro	67	(United States) Ford Chip Ganassi Team UK	(United Kingdom) Andy Priaulx (United Kingdom) Harry Tincknell (Brazil) Pipo Derani	Ford GT	MI	150	+23 Laps
20	LMGTE; Pro	67	(United States) Ford Chip Ganassi Team UK	(United Kingdom) Andy Priaulx (United Kingdom) Harry Tincknell (Brazil) Pipo Derani	Ford EcoBoost 3.5 L Turbo V6	MI	150	+23 Laps
21	LMGTE; Pro	91	(Germany) Porsche GT Team	(Austria) Richard Lietz (France) Frédéric Makowiecki	Porsche 911 RSR	MI	149	+24 Laps
21	LMGTE; Pro	91	(Germany) Porsche GT Team	(Austria) Richard Lietz (France) Frédéric Makowiecki	Porsche 4.0 L Flat-6	MI	149	+24 Laps
22	LMGTE; Pro	92	(Germany) Porsche GT Team	(Denmark) Michael Christensen (France) Kévin Estre	Porsche 911 RSR	MI	149	+24 Laps
22	LMGTE; Pro	92	(Germany) Porsche GT Team	(Denmark) Michael Christensen (France) Kévin Estre	Porsche 4.0 L Flat-6	MI	149	+24 Laps
23	LMGTE; Pro	97	(United Kingdom) Aston Martin Racing	(United Kingdom) Darren Turner (United Kingdom) Jonathan Adam (Brazil) Daniel Serra	Aston Martin Vantage GTE	D	148	+25 Laps
23	LMGTE; Pro	97	(United Kingdom) Aston Martin Racing	(United Kingdom) Darren Turner (United Kingdom) Jonathan Adam (Brazil) Daniel Serra	Aston Martin 4.5 L V8	D	148	+25 Laps
24	LMGTE; Pro	95	(United Kingdom) Aston Martin Racing	(Denmark) Nicki Thiim (Denmark) Marco Sørensen (New Zealand) Richie Stanaway	Aston Martin Vantage GTE	D	148	+25 Laps
24	LMGTE; Pro	95	(United Kingdom) Aston Martin Racing	(Denmark) Nicki Thiim (Denmark) Marco Sørensen (New Zealand) Richie Stanaway	Aston Martin 4.5 L V8	D	148	+25 Laps
25	**LMGTE; Am**	**98**	**(United Kingdom) Aston Martin Racing**	**(Canada) Paul Dalla Lana (Portugal) Pedro Lamy (Austria) Mathias Lauda**	**Aston Martin Vantage GTE**	D	**146**	**+27 Laps**
25	**LMGTE; Am**	**98**	**(United Kingdom) Aston Martin Racing**	**(Canada) Paul Dalla Lana (Portugal) Pedro Lamy (Austria) Mathias Lauda**	**Aston Martin 4.5 L V8**	D	**146**	**+27 Laps**
26	LMGTE; Am	77	(Germany) Dempsey-Proton Racing	(Germany) Christian Ried (Italy) Matteo Cairoli (Germany) Marvin Dienst	Porsche 911 RSR	D	146	+27 Laps
26	LMGTE; Am	77	(Germany) Dempsey-Proton Racing	(Germany) Christian Ried (Italy) Matteo Cairoli (Germany) Marvin Dienst	Porsche 4.0 L Flat-6	D	146	+27 Laps
27	LMGTE; Am	61	(Singapore) Clearwater Racing	(Singapore) Weng Sun Mok (Japan) Keita Sawa (Republic of Ireland) Matt Griffin	Ferrari 488 GTE	MI	145	+28 Laps
27	LMGTE; Am	61	(Singapore) Clearwater Racing	(Singapore) Weng Sun Mok (Japan) Keita Sawa (Republic of Ireland) Matt Griffin	Ferrari F154CB 3.9 L Turbo V8	MI	145	+28 Laps
28	LMGTE; Am	54	(Switzerland) Spirit of Race	(Switzerland) Thomas Flohr (Italy) Francesco Castellacci (Spain) Miguel Molina	Ferrari 488 GTE	MI	144	+29 Laps
28	LMGTE; Am	54	(Switzerland) Spirit of Race	(Switzerland) Thomas Flohr (Italy) Francesco Castellacci (Spain) Miguel Molina	Ferrari F154CB 3.9 L Turbo V8	MI	144	+29 Laps
DNF	LMP2	34	(United Kingdom) Tockwith Motorsports	(United Kingdom) Nigel Moore (United Kingdom) Philip Hanson (India) Karun Chandhok	Ligier JS P217	D	151	Retired
DNF	LMP2	34	(United Kingdom) Tockwith Motorsports	(United Kingdom) Nigel Moore (United Kingdom) Philip Hanson (India) Karun Chandhok	Gibson GK428 4.2 L V8	D	151	Retired
DNF	LMGTE; Am	86	(United Kingdom) Gulf Racing	(United Kingdom) Michael Wainwright (United Kingdom) Ben Barker (Australia) Nick Foster	Porsche 911 RSR	D	76	Collison
DNF	LMGTE; Am	86	(United Kingdom) Gulf Racing	(United Kingdom) Michael Wainwright (United Kingdom) Ben Barker (Australia) Nick Foster	Porsche 4.0 L Flat-6	D	76	Collison

== Standings after the race ==
2017 LMP FIA World Endurance Drivers Championship standings

Pos.	+/–	Driver	Points
1		(United Kingdom) Anthony Davidson (Japan) Kazuki Nakajima (Switzerland) Sébastien Buemi	50
2		(New Zealand) Brendon Hartley (New Zealand) Earl Bamber (Germany) Timo Bernhard	33
3		(Germany) André Lotterer (Switzerland) Neel Jani (United Kingdom) Nick Tandy	28
4	6	(Japan) Kamui Kobayashi (United Kingdom) Mike Conway	19.5
5	1	(Netherlands) Ho-Pin Tung (United Kingdom) Oliver Jarvis (France) Thomas Laurent	16

2017 LMP1 FIA World Endurance Manufacturers Championship standings

Pos.	+/–	Constructor	Points
1	1	(Japan) Toyota	69.5
2	1	(Germany) Porsche	61

- Note: Only the top five positions are included for the Drivers' Championship standings.

2017 GT FIA World Endurance Drivers Championship standings

Pos.	+/–	Driver	Points
1		(United Kingdom) Andy Priaulx (United Kingdom) Harry Tincknell (Brazil) Pipo Derani	38
2	3	(Italy) Davide Rigon (United Kingdom) Sam Bird	36
3	1	(Italy) Alessandro Pier Guidi (United Kingdom) James Calado	36
4	1	(United States) Billy Johnson (France) Olivier Pla (Germany) Stefan Mücke	27
5	2	(France) Frédéric Makowiecki (Austria) Richard Lietz	25

2017 GT FIA World Endurance Manufacturers Championship standings

Pos.	+/–	Constructor	Points
1	1	(Italy) Ferrari	72
2	1	(United States) Ford	65
3		(Germany) Porsche	34
4		(United Kingdom) Aston Martin	24

- Note: Only the top five positions are included for the Drivers' Championship standings.
