= Toyota GR010 Hybrid =

Sports racing car

Toyota GR010 Hybrid Toyota TR010 Hybrid
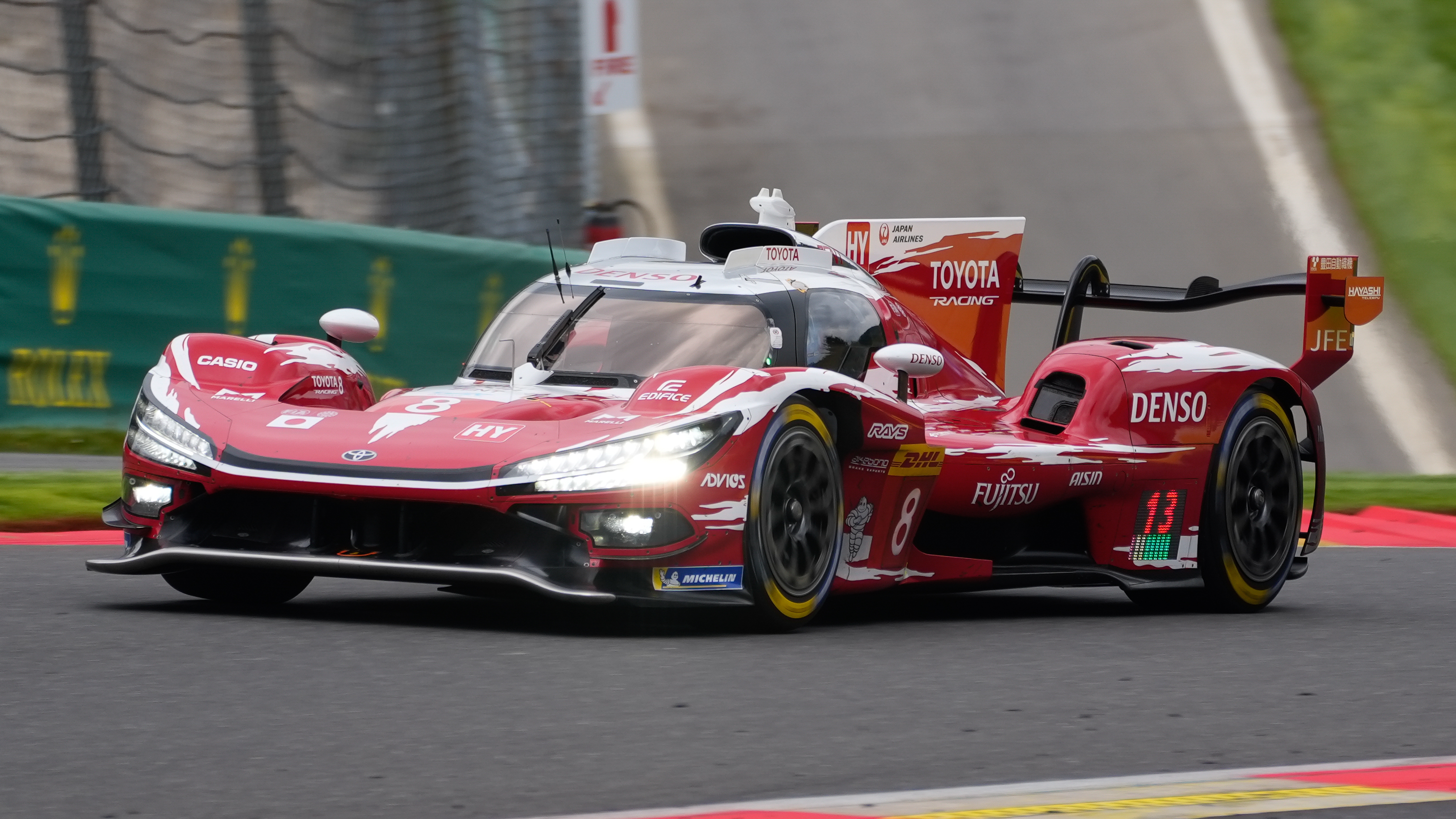
- The No. 8 TR010 Hybrid at the 2026 6 Hours of Spa-Francorchamps
- Category: Le Mans Hypercar
- Constructor: Toyota
- Designers: Pascal Vasselon (Technical Director); John Litjens (Project Leader, Chassis); Hisatake Murata (Technical Director, Power Unit)
- Predecessor: Toyota TS050 Hybrid

Technical specifications
- Chassis: Carbon fibre and aluminium honeycomb monocoque
- Suspension (front): Independent, double wishbone, pushrod-system
- Suspension (rear): Independent, double wishbone, pushrod-system
- Length: 4,900 mm (193 in; 16 ft)
- Width: 2,000 mm (79 in; 7 ft)
- Height: 1,150 mm (45 in; 4 ft)
- Engine: Toyota H8909 3.5 L (214 cu in) 90-degree V6 twin-turbo mid, longitudinally mounted with 4WD system
- Electric motor: Aisin-Denso (Front Hybrid Motor)
- Transmission: Toyota with Aisin internals transverse 7-speed + 1 reverse sequential semi-automatic
- Battery: Toyota Hybrid System – Racing (THS-R) lithium-ion batteries
- Power: 500 kW (671 hp) (ICE) 200 kW (268 hp) (electric motors)
- Weight: 1,040 kg (2,293 lb)
- Fuel: TotalEnergies Excellium
- Lubricants: Mobil 1
- Brakes: Brembo carbon ventilated front and rear discs + Brembo pads + Akebono calipers
- Tyres: Michelin radial slicks with Rays one-piece forged alloys, 29/71-18 front and 34/71-18 rear

Competition history
- Notable entrants: (Japan) Toyota Gazoo Racing/Toyota Racing
- Notable drivers: (Japan) Kamui Kobayashi; (Japan) Kazuki Nakajima; (Japan) Ryō Hirakawa; (United Kingdom) Mike Conway; (Argentina) José María López; (New Zealand) Brendon Hartley; (Switzerland) Sébastien Buemi; (Netherlands) Nyck de Vries
- Debut: 2021 6 Hours of Spa-Francorchamps
- First win: 2021 6 Hours of Spa-Francorchamps
- Last win: 2026 6 Hours of Barcelona
- Last event: 2026 6 Hours of Monza
Races	Wins	Podiums	Poles	F/Laps
43	24	46	15	13
- Teams' Championships: 1 (2021 FIA WEC)
- Constructors' Championships: 4 (2022 FIA WEC, 2023 FIA WEC, 2024 FIA WEC, 2026 FIA WEC)
- Drivers' Championships: 4 (2021 FIA WEC, 2022 FIA WEC, 2023 FIA WEC, 2026 FIA WEC)

The Toyota GR010 Hybrid is a sports prototype racing car developed by Toyota Gazoo Racing Europe for the 2021 Le Mans Hypercar rules in the FIA World Endurance Championship. The car is the successor of the Toyota TS050 Hybrid, which competed in the WEC from 2016 to 2020, achieving two double WEC world titles and three straight victories at the 24 Hours of Le Mans from 2018 to 2020. The GR010 Hybrid was revealed online on 15 January 2021. A bodywork update saw the car renamed to Toyota TR010 Hybrid in 2026, in line with the team's rebrand to Toyota Racing.

As of 2025, the GR010 Hybrid remains as the most-successful Toyota-built sports prototype race car ever to date.

== Development ==
=== GR010 Hybrid ===
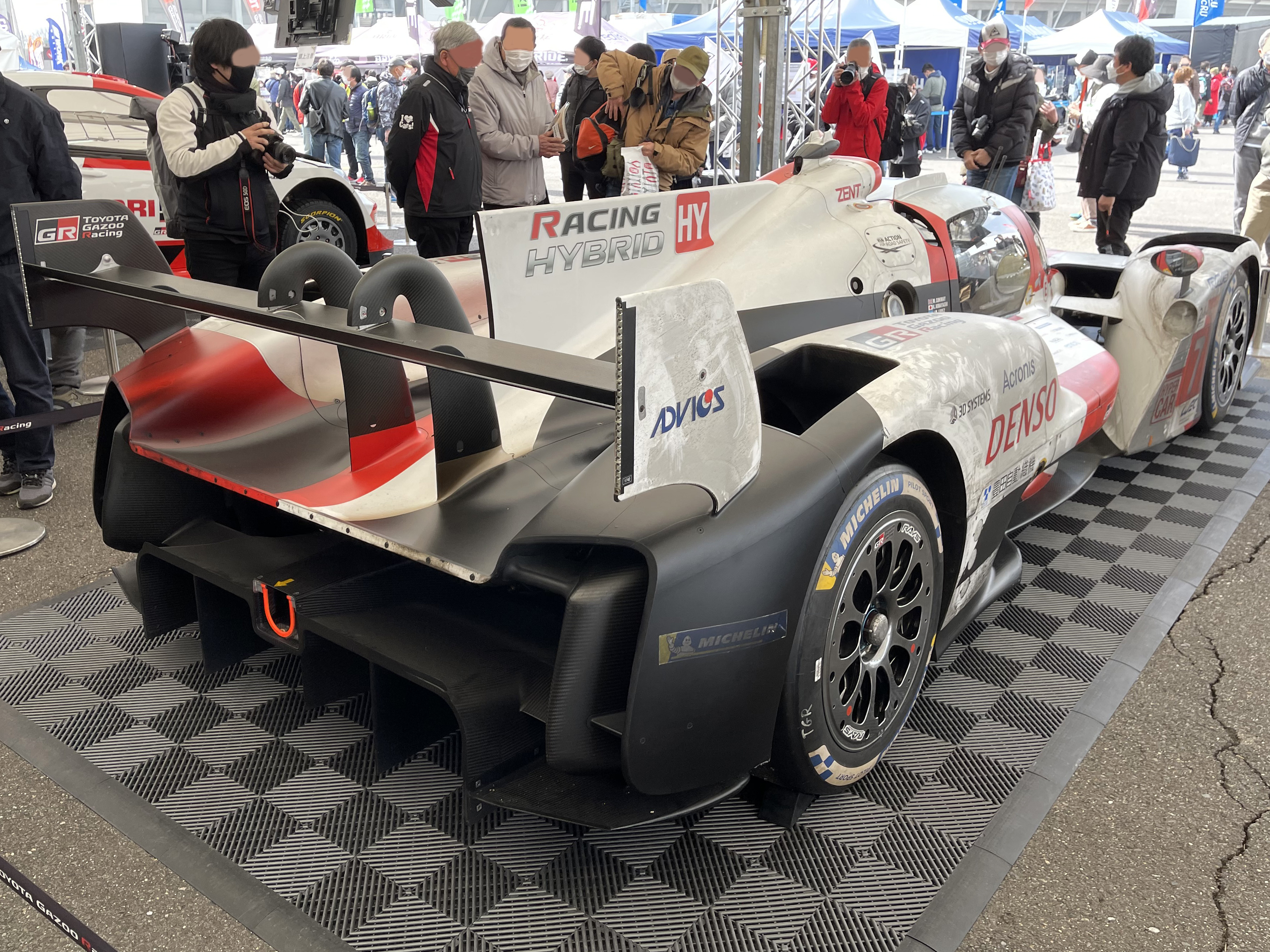
Rear view of the GR010 Hybrid.

The GR010's design is inspired by the Toyota GR Super Sport Concept presented at the 2018 Tokyo Auto Salon, which was considered to be the GR010's road version counterpart. Its engine is a 3.5 L twin-turbocharged petrol V6 with a hybrid system, which uses lithium-ion batteries.

Toyota filed the trademark "GR010" in September 2020, with the car's first rollout took place at Paul Ricard in October 2020. A second test took place at Portimao in December 2020.

The road car programme developed in parallel with the racing programme was cancelled early in 2021 before the GR Super Sport was cancelled in August of that year.

Lexus was considering plans to field a GR010 under the brand in the IMSA championship, but it was never materialized.

The GR010 Hybrid underwent an update in 2023 with a focus towards efficiency, reliability, and thermal cooling. The update also included slight aerodynamic changes, including new dive planes and smaller rear wing end plates. A new set of headlights were also installed to improve visibility at night.

=== TR010 Hybrid ===
Following the 2025 6 Hours of Fuji, Toyota confirmed plans to perform testing for an update to the GR010 Hybrid at Circuit Paul Ricard, releasing teaser images of the new car's design philosophy. The new car, wearing a camouflage livery, featured refinements to its aerodynamics, including a redesigned front end, new sidepods, and an updated rear wing. Originally set to be implemented during the 2025 season, Toyota opted to delay the updates for 2026. On 7 January 2026, Toyota formally unveiled the updated car under the name TR010 Hybrid, carrying a new naming convention, in line with the team's rebrand to Toyota Racing.

== Competition history ==
=== 2021 ===
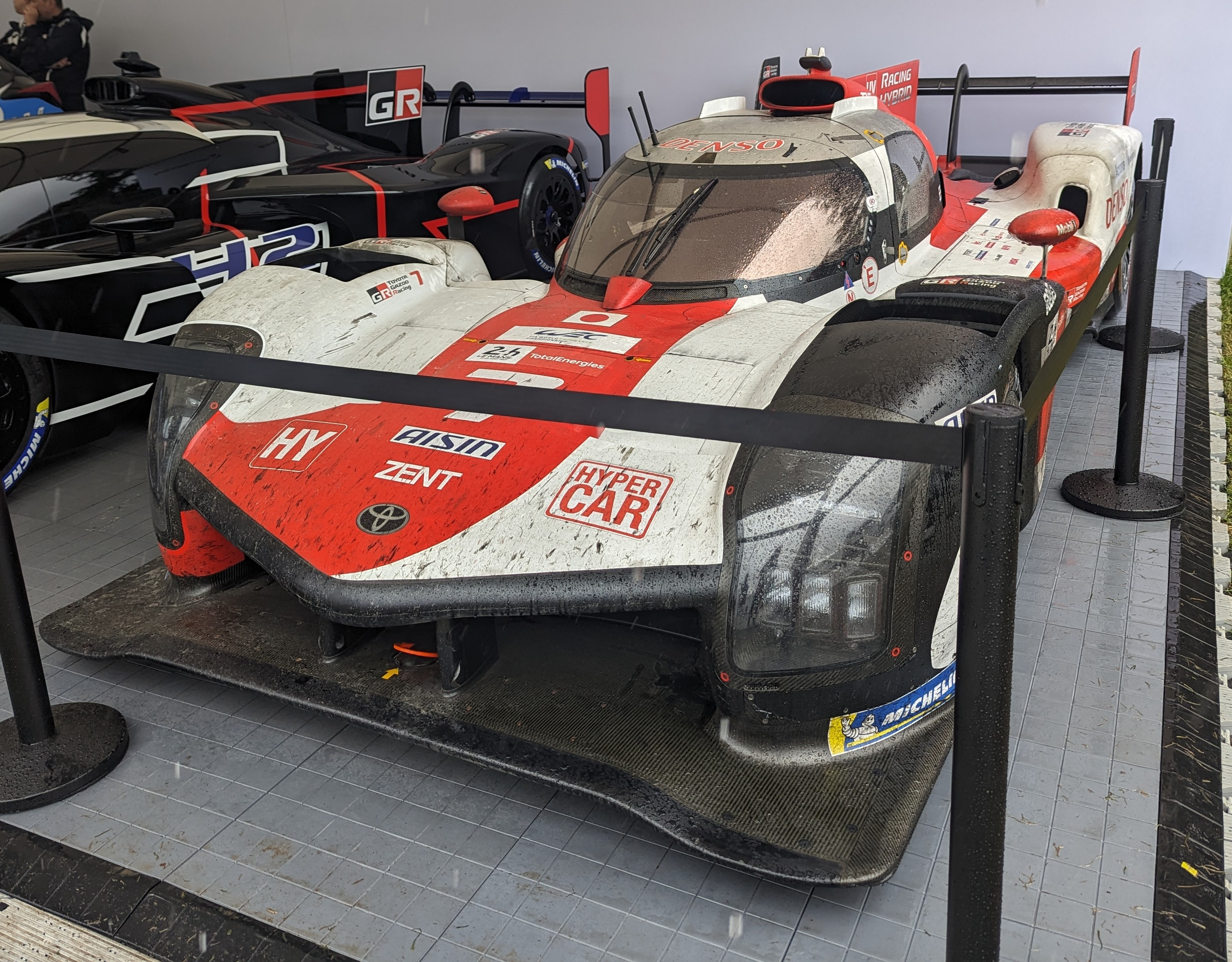
The No. 7 car was the first Hypercar to win the 24 Hours of Le Mans and both FIA World Endurance Championship titles.

For the GR010 Hybrid's debut season, Toyota maintained their driver lineup unchanged from the 2019–20 FIA World Endurance Championship, with Kamui Kobayashi, Mike Conway and José María López in car #7 and Sébastien Buemi, Kazuki Nakajima, and Brendon Hartley in car #8. Nyck de Vries remained as test driver, with Ryō Hirakawa joining him in development duties halfway through the year.

The 2021 WEC season was a complete success for Toyota and the GR010 Hybrid, with the car winning all 6 races of its debut season, securing pole position and fastest lap at 5 of them and having both cars in the podium at every race except Monza, where the #8 car had reliability issues. With the win in the first leg of the Bahrain double-header finale Toyota secured the Hypercar World Endurance Championship. Furthermore, at the 2021 24 Hours of Le Mans, Toyota would secure their fourth straight overall win in the event and the first for the #7 crew of Conway, Kobayashi and López, who would go on to repeat as World Endurance Drivers' Champions at the end of the year.

=== 2022 ===
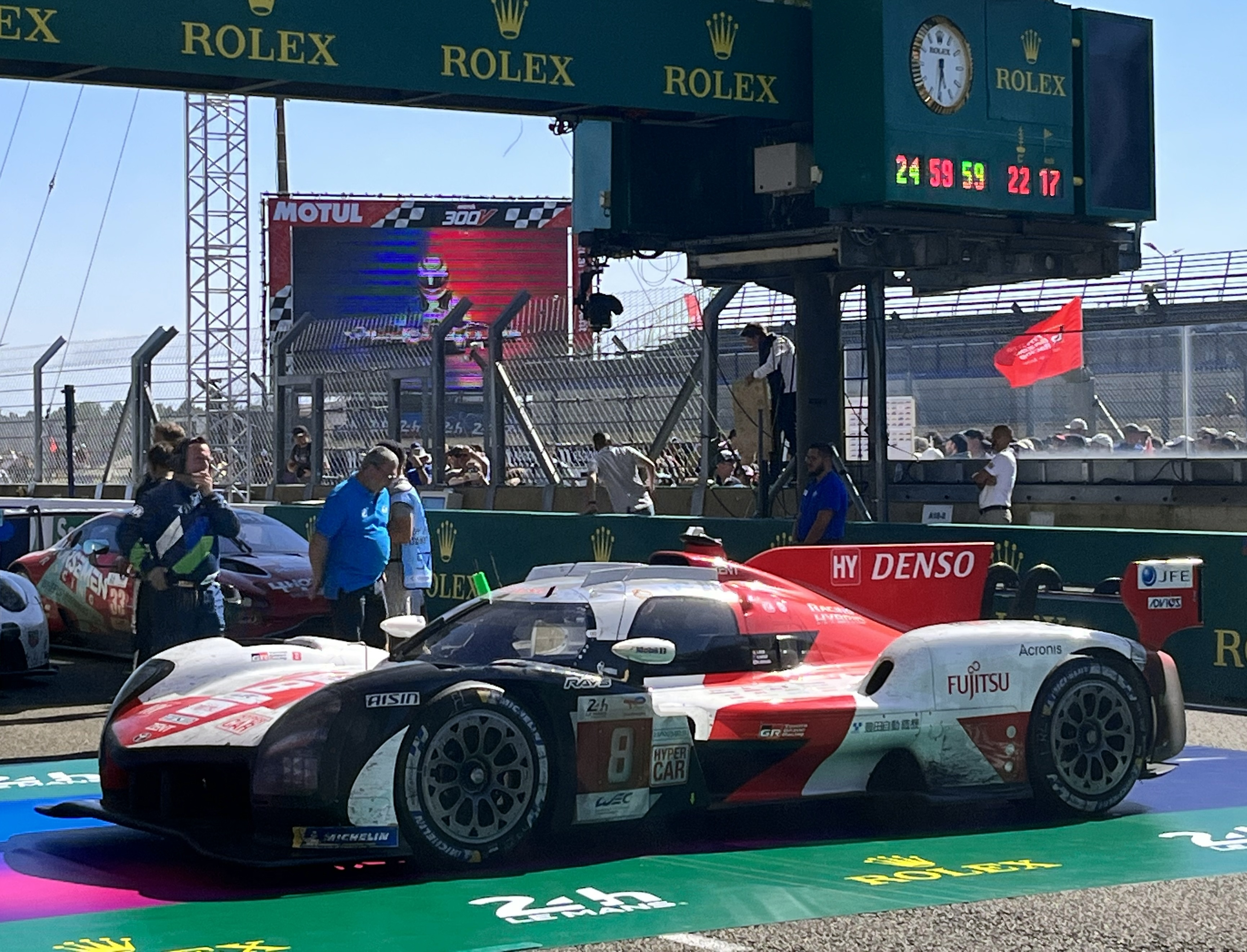
The No. 8 car took victory at the 2022 24 Hours of Le Mans (pictured), while the No. 7 car finished second.

After its inaugural season, Toyota would go on to repeat their success from 2021 in the 2022 WEC season with the GR010 Hybrid. They would maintain their lineup of Kamui Kobayashi, Mike Conway and José María López in their #7 car while for the #8 car they would bring in Ryō Hirakawa to join Sébastien Buemi and Brendon Hartley.

Despite a crash in the 1000 Miles of Sebring and a retirement during the 6 Hours of Spa, both Toyota cars would podium in every race including the 24 Hours of Le Mans, 6 Hours of Fuji, and 8 Hours of Bahrain all of which they finished both first and second. This led to them winning the 2022 Hypercar World Endurance Constructors Championship. In the driver's championship, the crew of the #8 car would become the 2022 Hypercar World Endurance Drivers Champions and the #7 car would place third in the standings.

=== 2023 ===
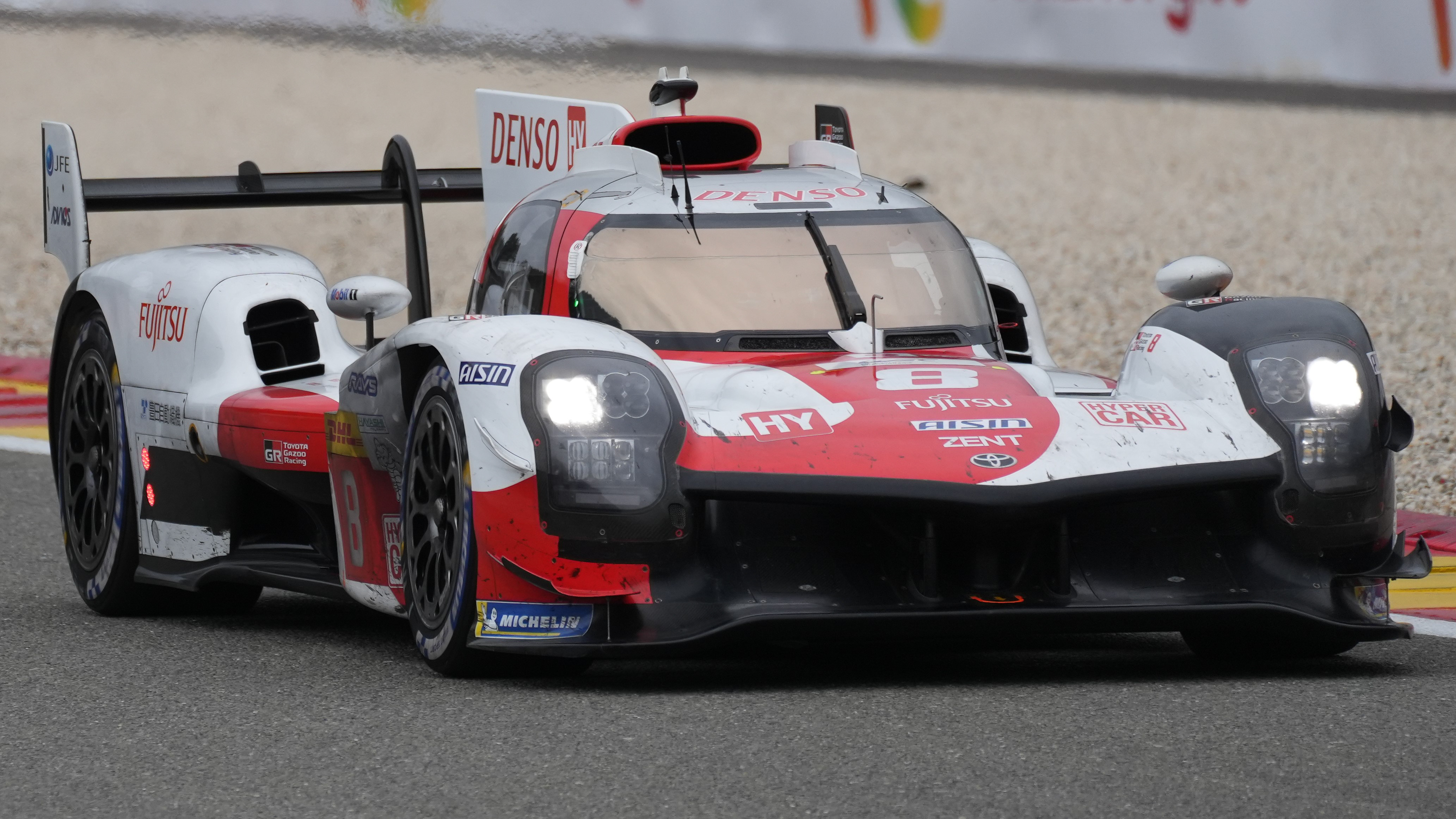
The No. 8 GR010 Hybrid at the 2023 6 Hours of Spa-Francorchamps, featuring aero and lighting updates.

Having won the last two Hypercar World Endurance Championships, the GR010 Hybrid would go on to once again carry Toyota to even more success. Toyota kept the same drivers from the year prior with Kamui Kobayashi, Mike Conway, and José María López in the #7 car and Ryō Hirakawa, Sébastien Buemi, and Brendon Hartley in the #8 car.

Toyota started the season by finishing the 1000 Miles of Sebring in first and second place and they would continue this success throughout the season with only 3 finishes outside the top two. One of these finishes occurred during the 24 Hours of Le Mans when the #7 Toyota was hit by another car while slowing down for a collision which forced the Toyota to retire due to the damage, leaving the #8 car to finish third. Nevertheless, the team convincingly won the 2023 Hypercar World Endurance Constructors Championship with 217 points. The crew of the #8 car would once again win the Hypercar World Endurance Driver Championship, with the crew of the #7 car taking second place.

=== 2024 ===
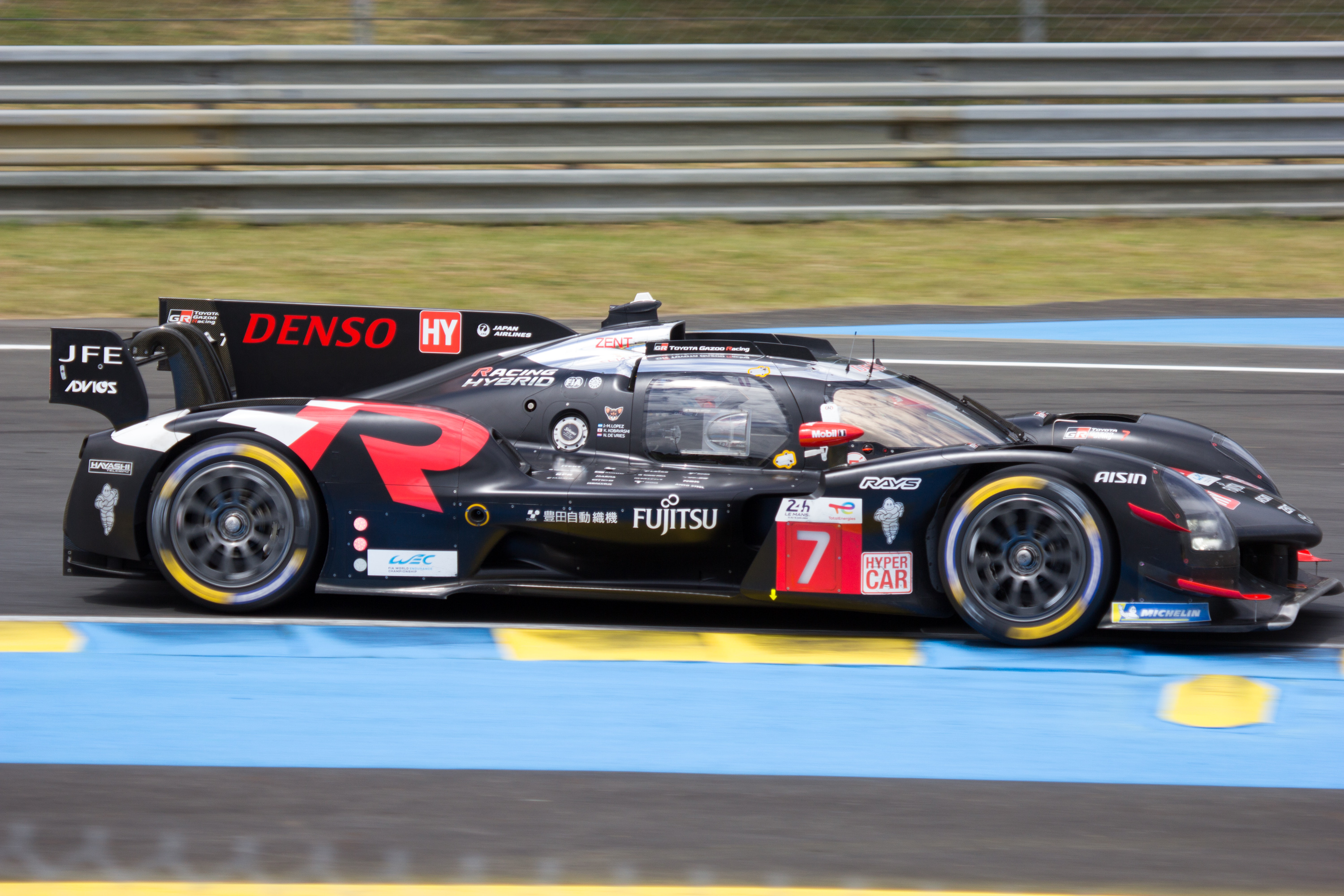
The No. 7 GR010 Hybrid finished second in the 2024 24 Hours of Le Mans.

The GR010 returned to defend both titles in 2024. The lineup for #8 car remains the same as it was in 2023, while Nyck de Vries joining the #7 lineup replacing López who departed the team to join ASP in the LMGT3 class. The car sported a new matte black livery to represent Toyota's efforts in producing ever-better motorsports-bred cars and continuing their evolution.

At the season-opening Qatar 1812 km, Toyota missed out on the podium for the first time since the 2018 6 Hours of Silverstone with the #7 finishing sixth, while the #8 finished ninth, with the drivers attributing it with the lack of pace. The team only took three wins that year, namely in Imola, São Paulo, and the title-deciding finale in Bahrain where they pipped Porsche by six points to take the Manufacturers' Championship despite both cars losing out to the #6 Porsche in the Drivers' Championship.

=== 2025 ===
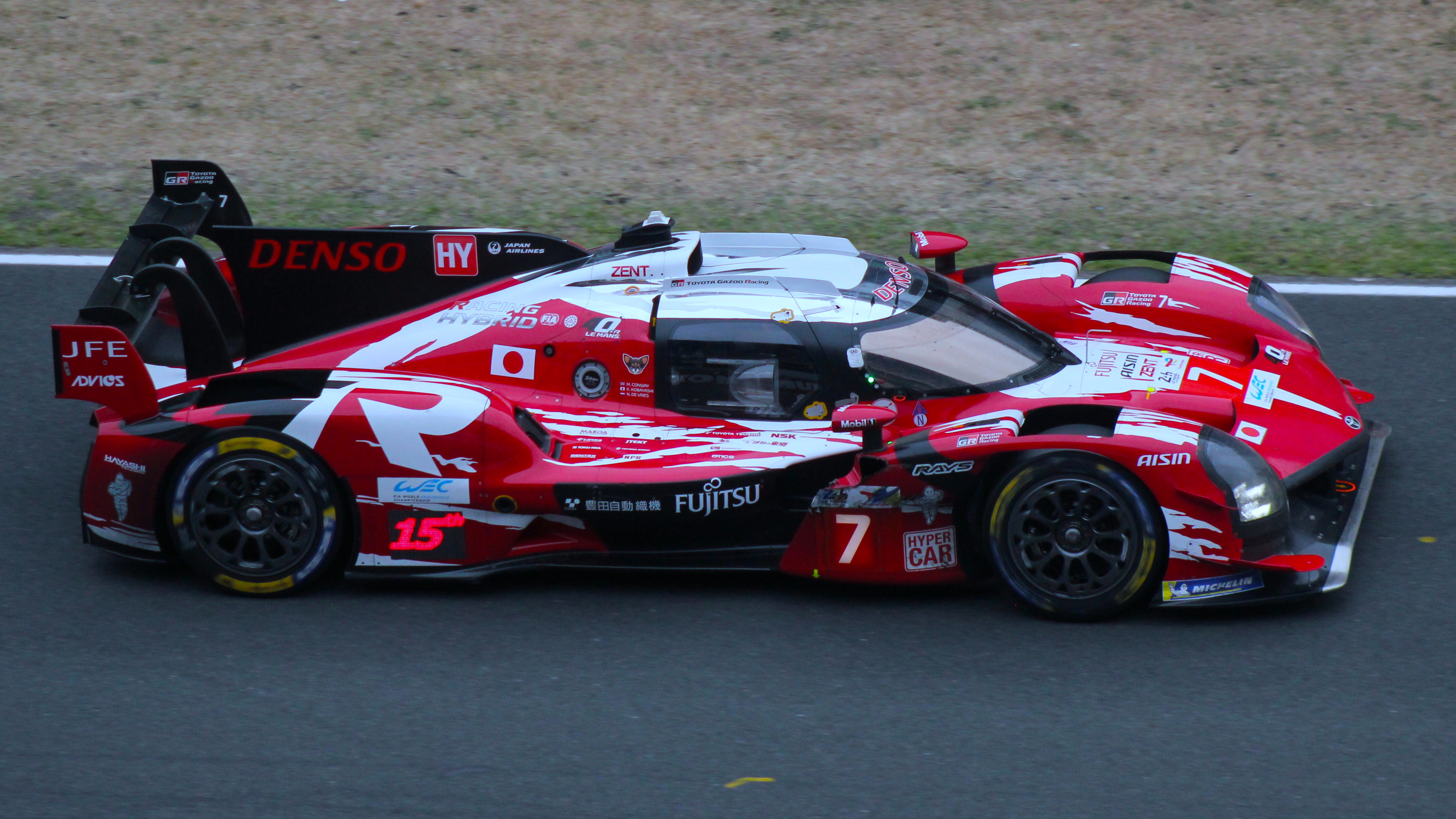
The No. 7 GR010 Hybrid at the 2025 24 Hours of Le Mans.

Toyota returned for another season in 2025 as the defending Manufacturers' champions. Toyota spent the first half of the season in the midfield and failed to score a podium, with a best finish of 4th in Spa-Francorchamps. The team suffered further setbacks heading into Le Mans, where the GR010 was among the slowest cars in the speed trap, clocking a speed of 342.3 km/h (212.7 mph).

In the aftermath of the next race at São Paulo, where Toyota finished 14th and 15th, technical director David Floury criticised the FIA World Endurance Championship's balance of performance, describing the series as becoming "far too artificial" and called for a revision of the series' BoP mechanism. Toyota returned to form in Bahrain season finale, finishing 1st and 2nd overall. The GR010's four-year run of consecutive titles would end in 2025, marking the first time Toyota would fail to defend either title, losing to eventual champions Ferrari.

=== 2026 ===
Toyota would implement a significant update to the GR010 Hybrid in 2026, with the car racing as the TR010 Hybrid following the team's rebrand to Toyota Racing. The new package — described by Hirakawa as having "better handling and better top speed" — proved to be an immediate success, as Toyota finished 1st and 3rd in the 2026 6 Hours of Imola season opener. At the 2026 24 Hours of Le Mans, Toyota held off BMW and Cadillac en route to a third win at the event in six years.

== Complete World Endurance Championship results ==
Results in bold indicate pole position. Results in italics indicate fastest lap.

Year	Entrant	Chassis	Class	Drivers	No.	1	2	3	4	5	6	7	8	Points	Pos
2021						SPA	POR	MON	LMN	BHR	BHR				
2021	Toyota Gazoo Racing	Toyota GR010 Hybrid	Hypercar	(United Kingdom) Mike Conway	7	**3**	2	**1**	**1**	1	**2**			206	1st
2021	Toyota Gazoo Racing	Toyota GR010 Hybrid	Hypercar	(Japan) Kamui Kobayashi	7	**3**	2	**1**	**1**	1	**2**			206	1st
2021	Toyota Gazoo Racing	Toyota GR010 Hybrid	Hypercar	(Argentina) José María López	7	**3**	2	**1**	**1**	1	**2**			206	1st
2021	Toyota Gazoo Racing	Toyota GR010 Hybrid	Hypercar	(New Zealand) Brendon Hartley	8	1	1	33	2	**2**	1			206	1st
2021	Toyota Gazoo Racing	Toyota GR010 Hybrid	Hypercar	(Switzerland) Sébastien Buemi	8	1	1	33	2	**2**	1			206	1st
2021	Toyota Gazoo Racing	Toyota GR010 Hybrid	Hypercar	(Japan) Kazuki Nakajima	8	1	1	33	2	**2**	1			206	1st
2022						SEB	SPA	LMN	MON	FUJ	BHR				
2022	Toyota Gazoo Racing	Toyota GR010 Hybrid	Hypercar	(United Kingdom) Mike Conway	7	Ret	1	2	3	**2**	1			186	1st
2022	Toyota Gazoo Racing	Toyota GR010 Hybrid	Hypercar	(Japan) Kamui Kobayashi	7	Ret	1	2	3	**2**	1			186	1st
2022	Toyota Gazoo Racing	Toyota GR010 Hybrid	Hypercar	(Argentina) José María López	7	Ret	1	2	3	**2**	1			186	1st
2022	Toyota Gazoo Racing	Toyota GR010 Hybrid	Hypercar	(New Zealand) Brendon Hartley	8	2	Ret	**1**	2	1	2			186	1st
2022	Toyota Gazoo Racing	Toyota GR010 Hybrid	Hypercar	(Switzerland) Sébastien Buemi	8	2	Ret	**1**	2	1	2			186	1st
2022	Toyota Gazoo Racing	Toyota GR010 Hybrid	Hypercar	(Japan) Ryō Hirakawa	8	2	Ret	**1**	2	1	2			186	1st
2023						SEB	POR	SPA	LMN	MON	FUJ	BHR			
2023	Toyota Gazoo Racing	Toyota GR010 Hybrid	Hypercar	(United Kingdom) Mike Conway	7	1	9	**1**	Ret	**1**	**1**	2		217	1st
2023	Toyota Gazoo Racing	Toyota GR010 Hybrid	Hypercar	(Japan) Kamui Kobayashi	7	1	9	**1**	Ret	**1**	**1**	2		217	1st
2023	Toyota Gazoo Racing	Toyota GR010 Hybrid	Hypercar	(Argentina) José María López	7	1	9	**1**	Ret	**1**	**1**	2		217	1st
2023	Toyota Gazoo Racing	Toyota GR010 Hybrid	Hypercar	(New Zealand) Brendon Hartley	8	2	**1**	2	2	6	2	**1**		217	1st
2023	Toyota Gazoo Racing	Toyota GR010 Hybrid	Hypercar	(Switzerland) Sébastien Buemi	8	2	**1**	2	2	6	2	**1**		217	1st
2023	Toyota Gazoo Racing	Toyota GR010 Hybrid	Hypercar	(Japan) Ryō Hirakawa	8	2	**1**	2	2	6	2	**1**		217	1st
2024						QAT	IMO	SPA	LMN	SÃO	COA	FUJ	BHR		
2024	Toyota Gazoo Racing	Toyota GR010 Hybrid	Hypercar	(United Kingdom) Mike Conway	7	6	1	7		4	2	Ret	Ret	190	1st
2024	Toyota Gazoo Racing	Toyota GR010 Hybrid	Hypercar	(Japan) Kamui Kobayashi	7	6	1	7	2	4	2	Ret	Ret	190	1st
2024	Toyota Gazoo Racing	Toyota GR010 Hybrid	Hypercar	(Netherlands) Nyck de Vries	7	6	1	7	2	4	2	Ret	Ret	190	1st
2024	Toyota Gazoo Racing	Toyota GR010 Hybrid	Hypercar	(Argentina) José María López	7				2					190	1st
2024	Toyota Gazoo Racing	Toyota GR010 Hybrid	Hypercar	(New Zealand) Brendon Hartley	8	9	5	6	5	**1**	15	10	**1**	190	1st
2024	Toyota Gazoo Racing	Toyota GR010 Hybrid	Hypercar	(Switzerland) Sébastien Buemi	8	9	5	6	5	**1**	15	10	**1**	190	1st
2024	Toyota Gazoo Racing	Toyota GR010 Hybrid	Hypercar	(Japan) Ryō Hirakawa	8	9	5	6	5	**1**	15	10	**1**	190	1st
2025						QAT	IMO	SPA	LMN	SÃO	COA	FUJ	BHR		
2025	Toyota Gazoo Racing	Toyota GR010 Hybrid	Hypercar	(United Kingdom) Mike Conway	7	6	7	7	5	14		7	**1**	171	2nd
2025	Toyota Gazoo Racing	Toyota GR010 Hybrid	Hypercar	(Japan) Kamui Kobayashi	7	6	7	7	5	14	14	7	**1**	171	2nd
2025	Toyota Gazoo Racing	Toyota GR010 Hybrid	Hypercar	(Netherlands) Nyck de Vries	7	6	7	7	5	14	14	7	**1**	171	2nd
2025	Toyota Gazoo Racing	Toyota GR010 Hybrid	Hypercar	(Argentina) José María López	7						14			171	2nd
2025	Toyota Gazoo Racing	Toyota GR010 Hybrid	Hypercar	(Switzerland) Sébastien Buemi	8	5	5	4	14		9	16	2	171	2nd
2025	Toyota Gazoo Racing	Toyota GR010 Hybrid	Hypercar	(New Zealand) Brendon Hartley	8	5	5	4	14	15	9	16	2	171	2nd
2025	Toyota Gazoo Racing	Toyota GR010 Hybrid	Hypercar	(Japan) Ryō Hirakawa	8	5	5	4	14	15	9	16	2	171	2nd
2026						IMO	SPA	LMN	SÃO	COA	FUJ	CAT	MNZ		
2026	Toyota Racing	Toyota TR010 Hybrid	Hypercar	(United Kingdom) Mike Conway	7	3	5	1	12	17	8	2	11	215	1st
2026	Toyota Racing	Toyota TR010 Hybrid	Hypercar	(Japan) Kamui Kobayashi	7	3	5	1	12	17	8	2	11	215	1st
2026	Toyota Racing	Toyota TR010 Hybrid	Hypercar	(Netherlands) Nyck de Vries	7	3	5	1	12	17	8	2	11	215	1st
2026	Toyota Racing	Toyota TR010 Hybrid	Hypercar	(Switzerland) Sébastien Buemi	8	1	10	3	17	6	1	1	10	215	1st
2026	Toyota Racing	Toyota TR010 Hybrid	Hypercar	(New Zealand) Brendon Hartley	8	1	10	3	17	6	1	1	10	215	1st
2026	Toyota Racing	Toyota TR010 Hybrid	Hypercar	(Japan) Ryō Hirakawa	8	1	10	3	17	6	1	1	10	215	1st

* Season in progress.

=== Race Victories ===
Year	Series	Race	Track	Car #	Category
2021	WEC	6 Hours of Spa-Francorchamps	(Belgium) Circuit de Spa-Francorchamps	8	Hypercar
2021	WEC	8 Hours of Portimão	(Portugal) Algarve International Circuit	8	Hypercar
2021	WEC	6 Hours of Monza	(Italy) Monza Circuit	7	Hypercar
2021	WEC	24 Hours of Le Mans	(France) Circuit de la Sarthe	7	Hypercar
2021	WEC	6 Hours of Bahrain	Bahrain International Circuit	7	Hypercar
2021	WEC	8 Hours of Bahrain	Bahrain International Circuit	8	Hypercar
2022	WEC	6 Hours of Spa-Francorchamps	(Belgium) Circuit de Spa-Francorchamps	7	Hypercar
2022	WEC	24 Hours of Le Mans	(France) Circuit de la Sarthe	8	Hypercar
2022	WEC	6 Hours of Fuji	(Japan) Fuji Speedway	8	Hypercar
2022	WEC	8 Hours of Bahrain	Bahrain International Circuit	7	Hypercar
2023	WEC	1,000 Miles of Sebring	(United States) Sebring International Raceway	7	Hypercar
2023	WEC	6 Hours of Portimão	(Portugal) Algarve International Circuit	8	Hypercar
2023	WEC	6 Hours of Spa-Francorchamps	(Belgium) Circuit de Spa-Francorchamps	7	Hypercar
2023	WEC	6 Hours of Monza	(Italy) Monza Circuit	7	Hypercar
2023	WEC	6 Hours of Fuji	(Japan) Fuji Speedway	7	Hypercar
2023	WEC	8 Hours of Bahrain	Bahrain International Circuit	8	Hypercar
2024	WEC	6 Hours of Imola	(Italy) Imola Circuit	7	Hypercar
2024	WEC	6 Hours of São Paulo	(Brazil) Interlagos Circuit	8	Hypercar
2024	WEC	8 Hours of Bahrain	Bahrain International Circuit	8	Hypercar
2025	WEC	8 Hours of Bahrain	Bahrain International Circuit	7	Hypercar
2026	WEC	6 Hours of Imola	(Italy) Imola Circuit	8	Hypercar
2026	WEC	24 Hours of Le Mans	(France) Circuit de la Sarthe	7	Hypercar
2026	WEC	6 Hours of Fuji	(Japan) Fuji Speedway	8	Hypercar
2026	WEC	6 Hours of Barcelona	(Spain) Circuit de Barcelona-Catalunya	8	Hypercar
