= Ford Ranchero =

Coupe utility

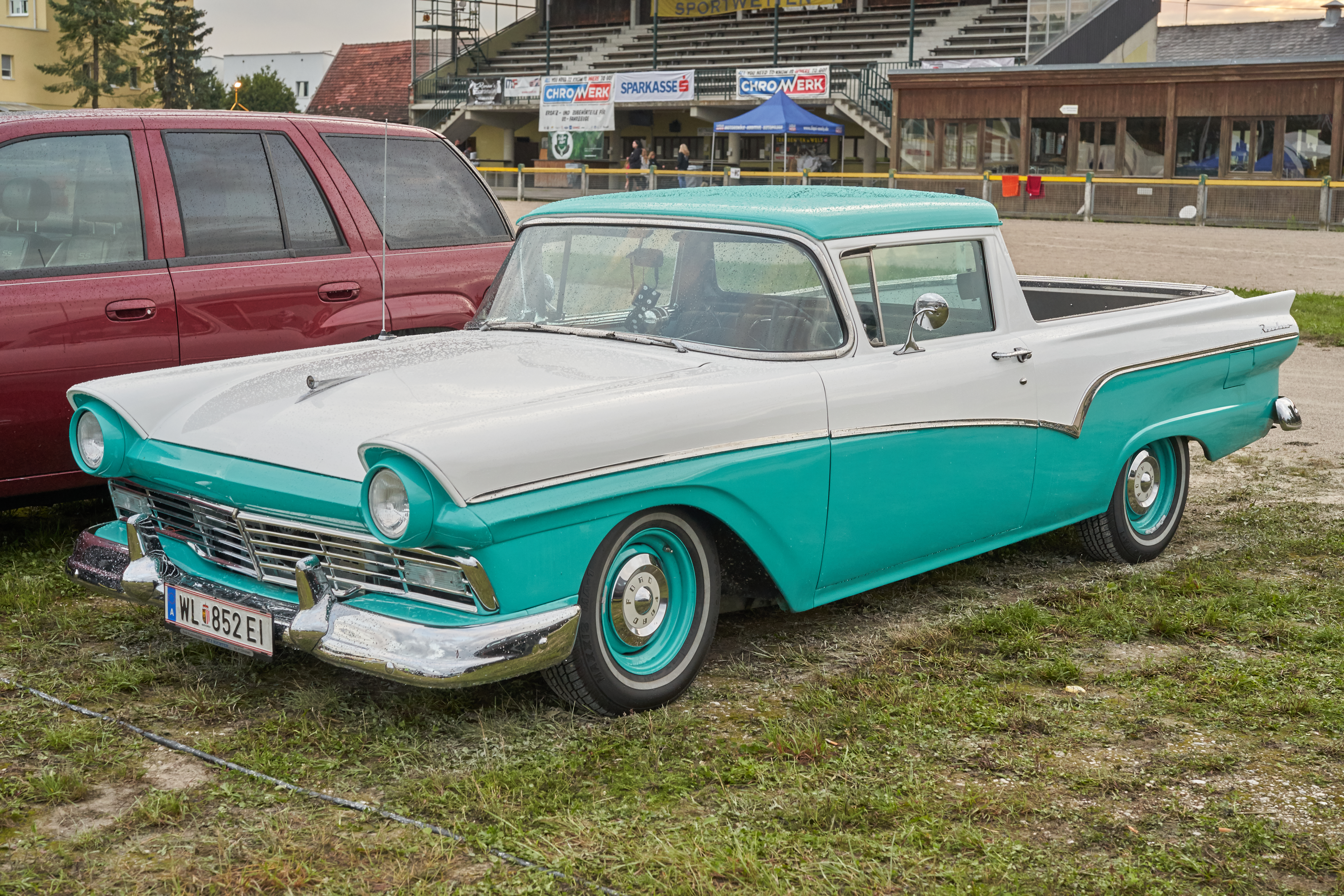
- 1957 Ford Ranchero

Overview
- Manufacturer: Ford
- Also called: Ford Falcon Ranchero; Ford Fairlane Ranchero; Meteor Ranchero
- Production: 1957–1979

Body and chassis
- Class: Full-sized (1957–1959); Compact (1960–1965); Mid-sized (1966–1979)
- Body style: 2-door coupe utility
- Layout: FR layout
- Related: Fairlane, Falcon, Galaxie, Torino, LTD II, Ford Durango

The Ford Ranchero is a coupe utility that was produced by Ford between 1957 and 1979. Unlike a standard pickup truck, the Ranchero was adapted from a two-door station wagon platform that integrated the cab and cargo bed into the body. A total of 508,355 units were produced during the model's production run. Over its lifespan it was variously derived from full-sized, compact, and intermediate automobiles sold by Ford for the North American market.

During the 1970s, the Ranchero name was used in the South African market for a rebadged Australian Ford Falcon utility. Shipped from Australia in complete knock down (CKD) form, these vehicles were assembled in South Africa at Ford's plant in Port Elizabeth. In Argentina, a utility version of the locally produced Ford Falcon was also called Ranchero.

The original Ranchero sold well enough to spawn a competitor from General Motors in 1959, the Chevrolet El Camino.

== History ==
The first Ford Model T and Model A pickup trucks were created from roadsters by placing a pickup box behind the body of a car. In 1934, Ford Australia's designer Lew Bandt modified a coupe with a smoothly integrated loadbed that could be used like a car to drive to church or to deliver pigs to market. This created the coupe utility which remains a popular body style known as the "ute" in Australia. In North America, pickup trucks evolved into a heavier duty form with cabs and beds that were quite distinct from passenger automobiles. The Ranchero was the first postwar American vehicle of its type adapted from a popular sedan from the factory. It combined the sleek looks of a sedan with the utility of a light-duty pickup truck.

== First generation (1957–1959) ==
First generation
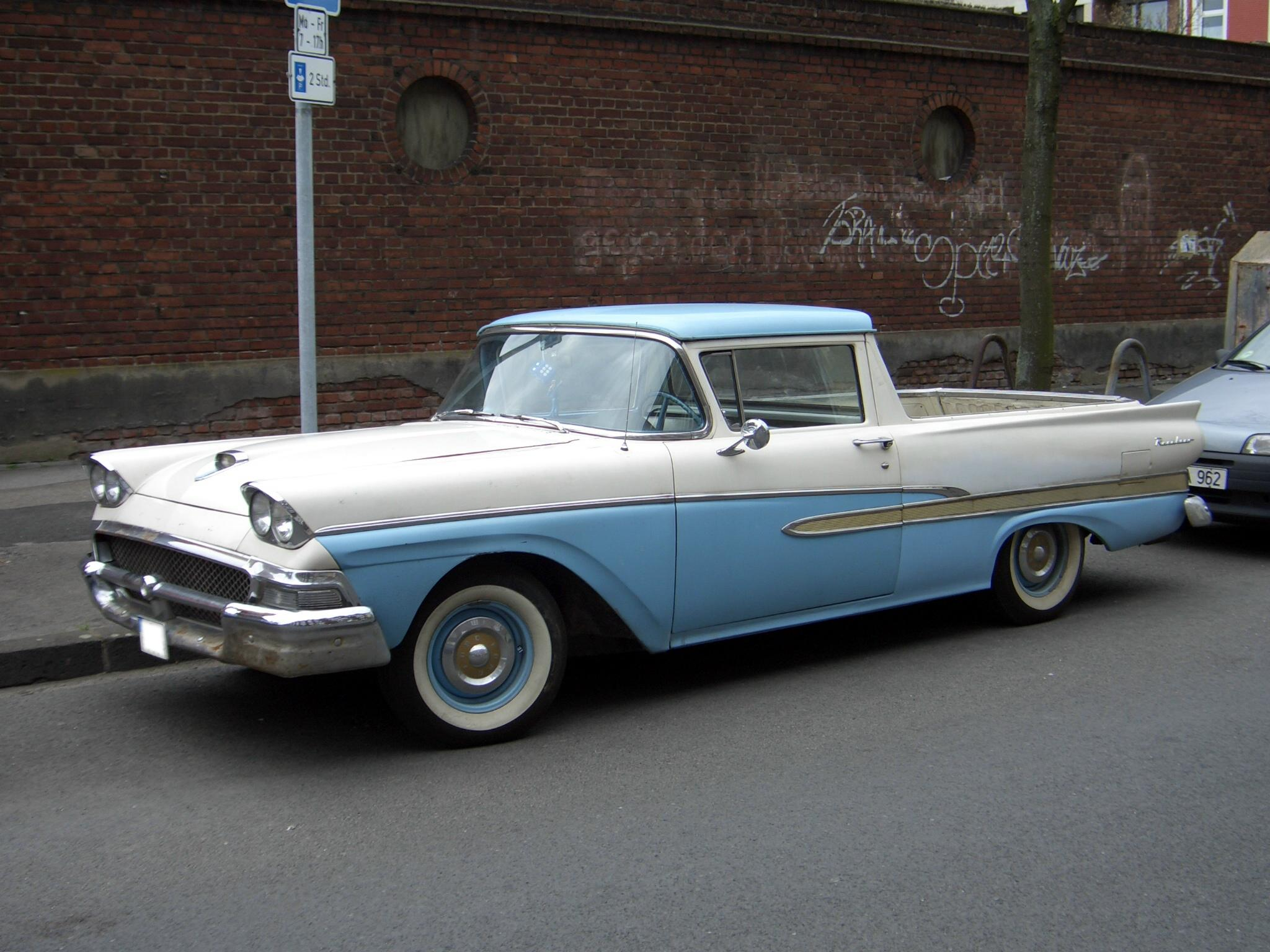
- 1958 Ford Ranchero

Overview
- Also called: Meteor Ranchero (Canada)
- Production: 1957–1959
- Assembly: Lorain, Ohio, United States (⧉); Milpitas, California, United States (⧉); Oakville, Ontario, Canada (⧉)

Body and chassis
- Related: 1957 Ford

Powertrain
- Engine: 223 CID (3.7 L) OHV I6; 292 CID (4.8 L) Y-block V8; 352 CID (5.8 L) FE V8
- Transmission: 3-speed manual 3-speed Cruise-O-Matic automatic 2-speed Ford-O-Matic automatic

Dimensions
- Wheelbase: 116–118 in (2,946–2,997 mm)
- Length: 202.0 in (5,131 mm)
- Width: 78.2 in (1,986.3 mm)
- Height: 59.9 in (1,521.5 mm)

Introduced in December 1956, three months after the traditional September model year start-up, the Ranchero was based on the standard and new-for-1957 full-sized Ford platform, specifically the short-wheelbase Custom sedan, two-door Ranch Wagon station wagon, and utilitarian Courier sedan delivery. Essentially a Courier with an open, reinforced bed, its own unique rear window and integrated cab and cargo box, the Ranchero was initially offered in two trim levels, and throughout the model run, was built on the corresponding automobile assembly line, but sold as a truck through Ford's truck division. An extremely basic standard model was marketed to traditional pickup truck buyers such as farmers, and the Custom picked up most of the options and accessories available on the Fairlane line, including stainless steel bodyside mouldings and two-tone paint.

Upscale models were badged both as a Fairlane and Ranchero, with a stylized representation of a Longhorn as the symbol for the model located on the tailgate. Indeed, print advertising of the time played on the theme of the American Southwest that the Spanish model name and Longhorn symbol were meant to evoke, showing artistic representations of the vehicle being used in ranching and outdoor activities, proclaiming it as "More Than A Car! More Than A Truck!" The Ranchero was a hit with both the automotive press and the buying public, filling an untapped market niche for vehicles with the utility of a light pickup and the ease of operation and riding characteristics of a car. In fact, the Ranchero had a marginally higher cargo capacity by about 50 lb (23 kg) than the half-ton F-Series pickup. Both standard and Custom could be ordered with any engine available for Ford cars, all the way up to the 312 cu in (5.1 L) "Thunderbird Special". In Canada, the Ranchero was also available in the Meteor line-up. Seat belts and padded instrument panels were optional.

The 1958 version remained largely unchanged under the skin save for the new front sheet metal (shared by the big '58 Ford and inspired by the Thunderbird) and its new four-headlamp arrangement. The 1957 rear end and tail lights were reused on the 1958 Ranchero.

The 1959 model was built with the same 118 in (3,000 mm) wheelbase as all 1959 Fords, giving the Ranchero the advantage over its predecessors of a new, longer 7 ft (210 cm) bed. However, this would be the last time the vehicle would grow either in size or trim for several years to come. The windshield was also 25% larger. Seatcovers were vinyl or "woven plastic", while the spare tire was located behind the passenger seat. The Custom Ranchero was the only model marketed in 1959, and was offered in 26 colors (11 solid shades, 11 two-tone combinations with white on top, and four other two-tone choices).

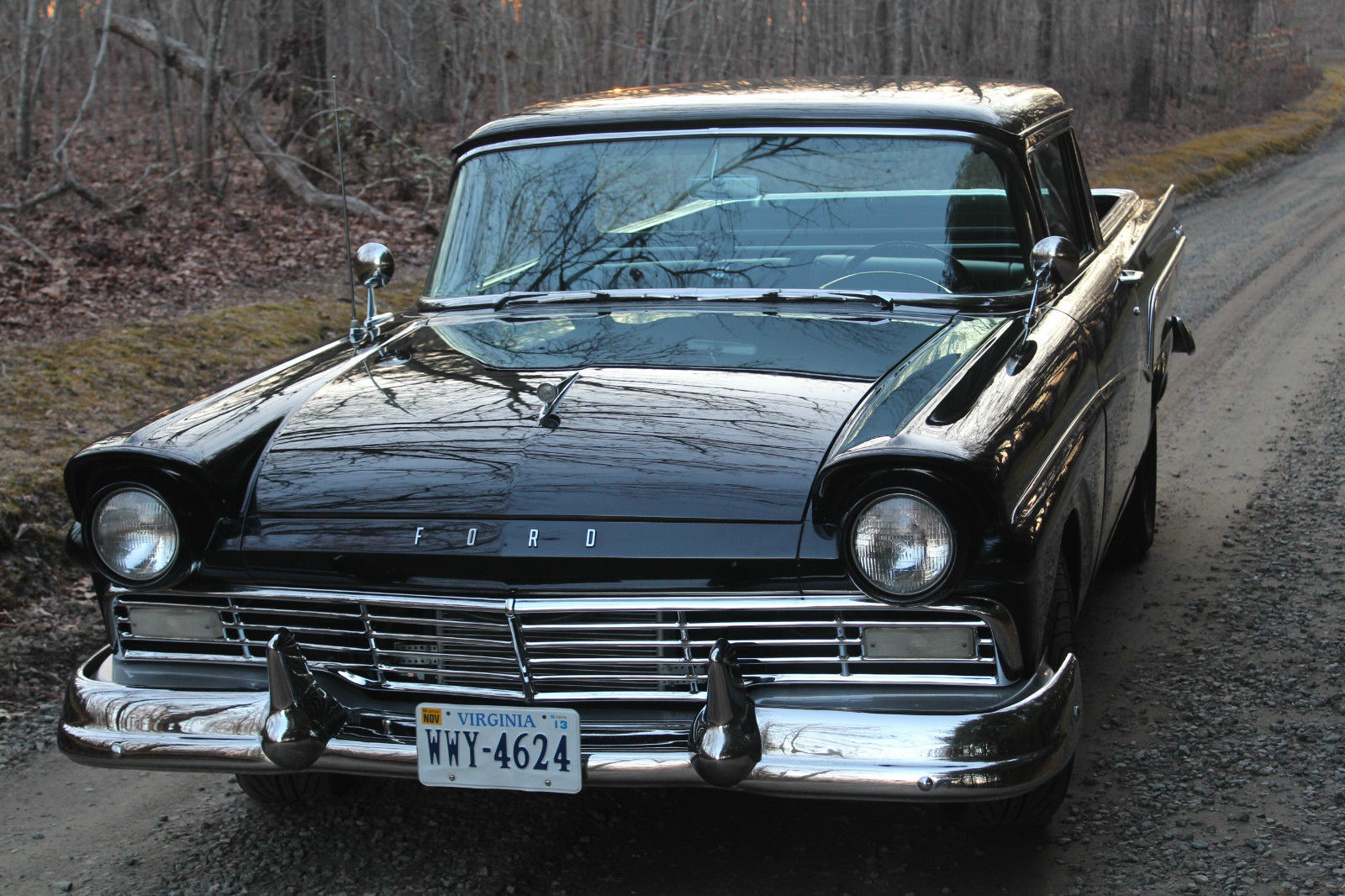
1957 Ford Custom Ranchero

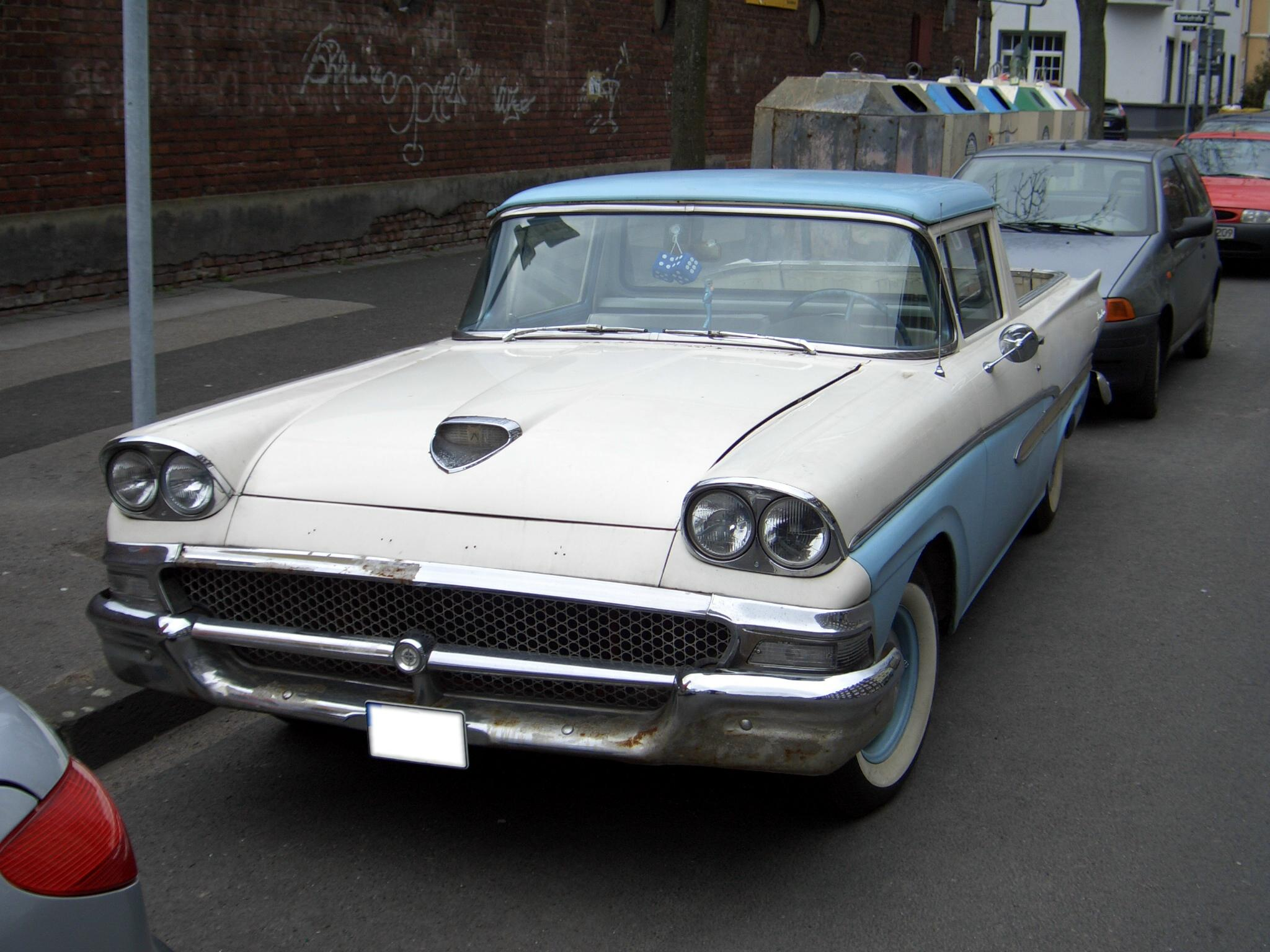
1958 Ford Ranchero

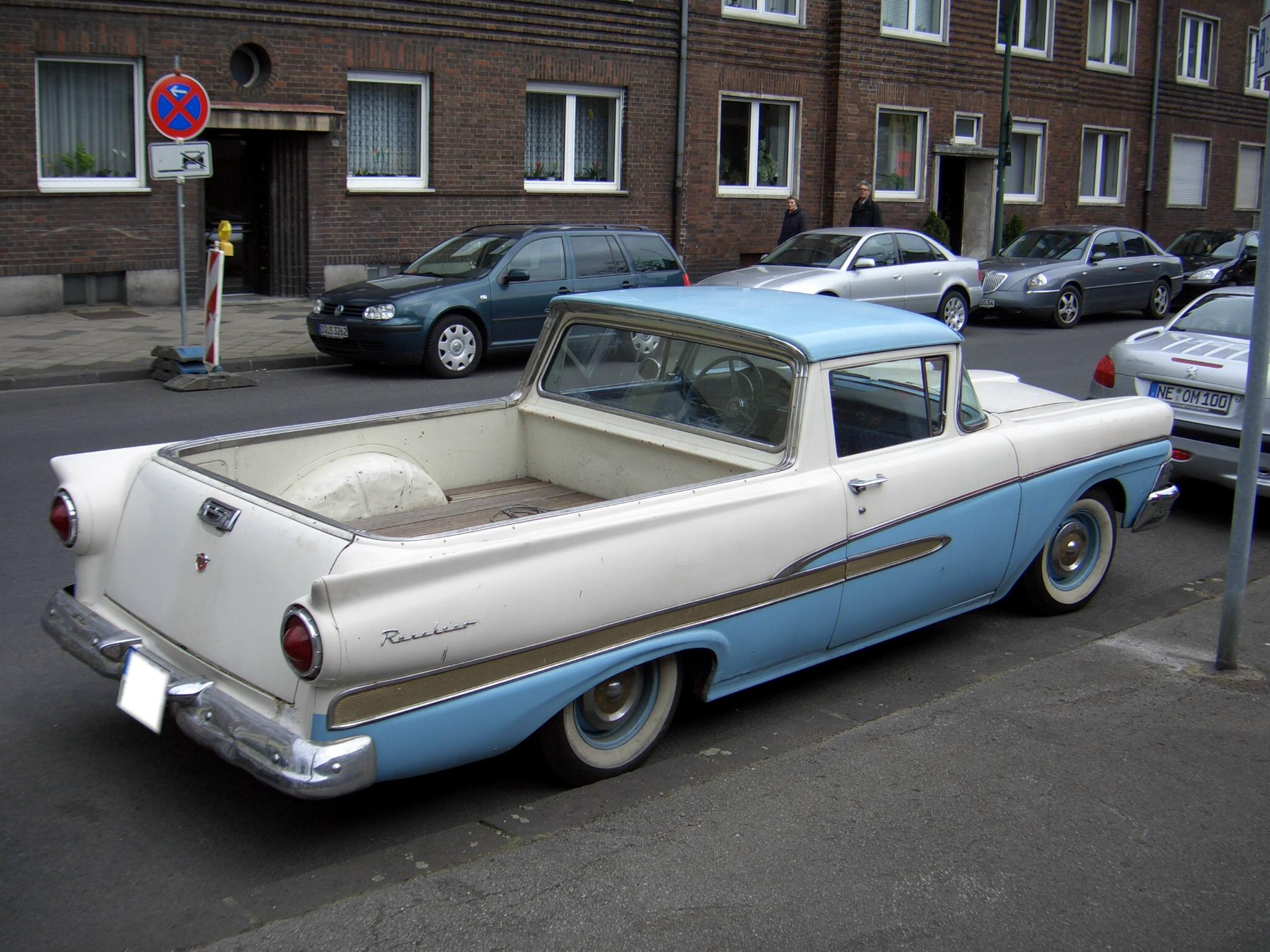
1958 Ford Ranchero, rear

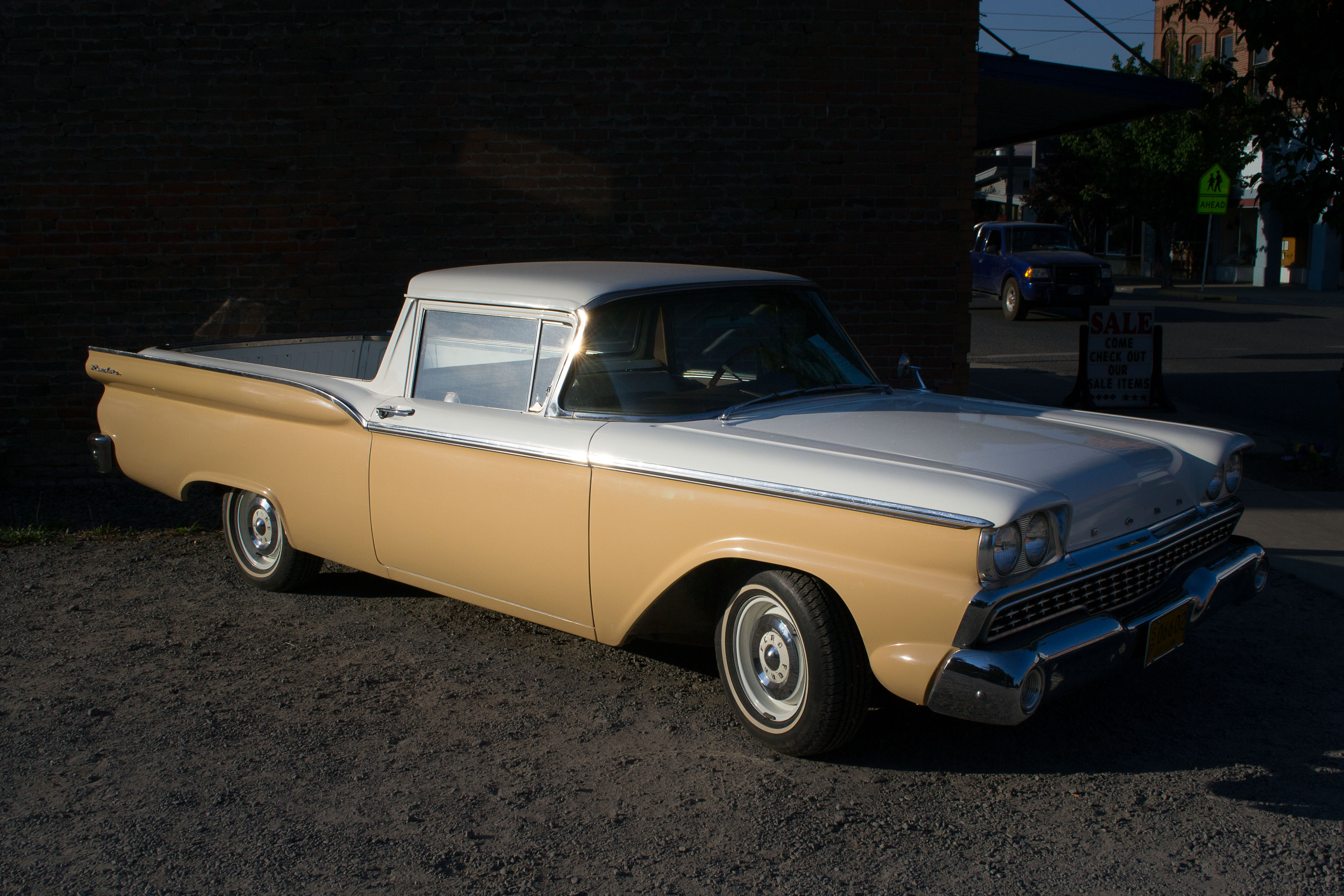
1959 Ford Ranchero

== Second generation (1960–1965) Falcon Ranchero ==
Second generation
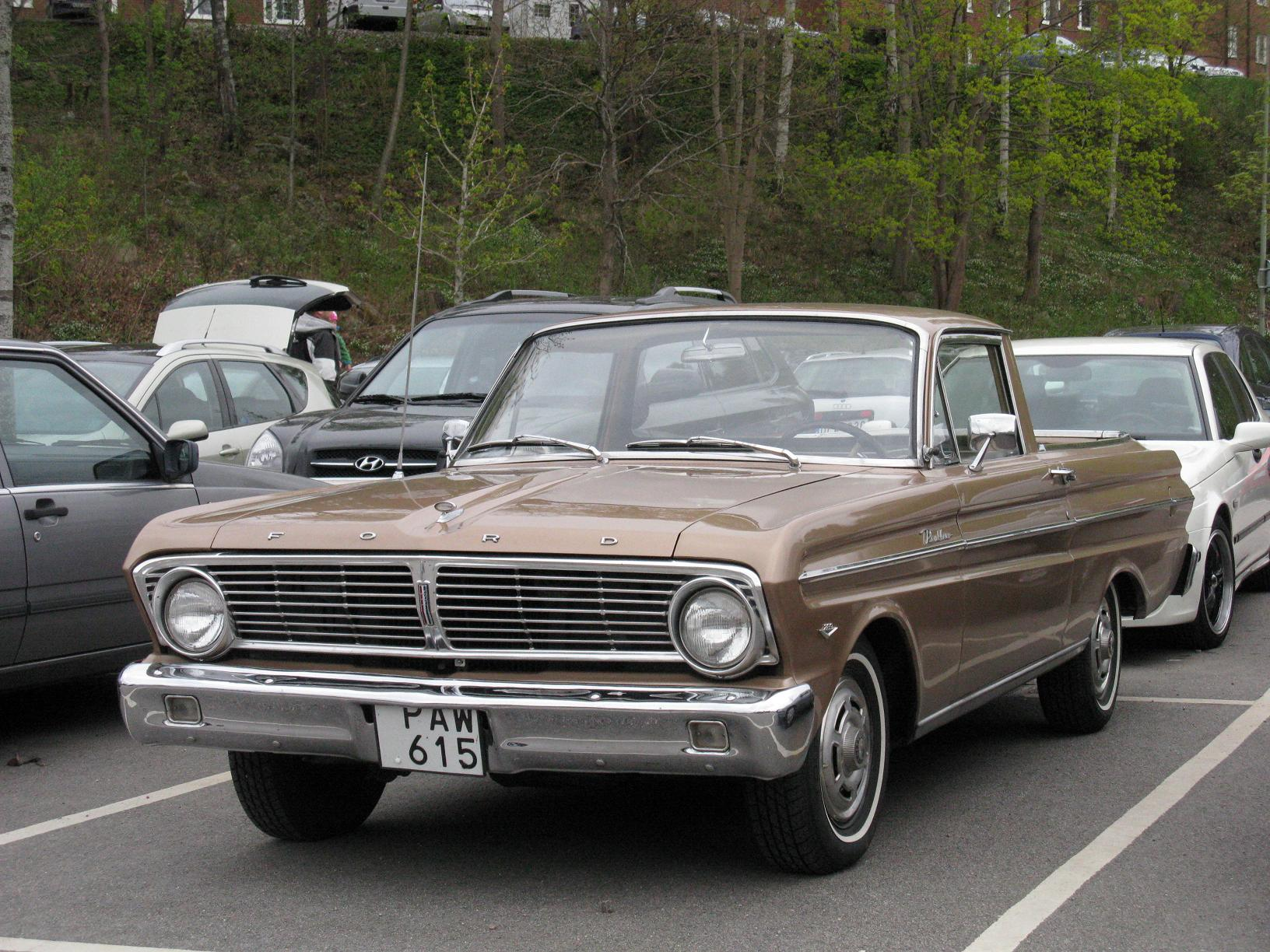
- 1965 Ford Falcon Ranchero

Overview
- Production: 1960–1965
- Assembly: Lorain, Ohio, United States (⧉); Buenos Aires, Argentina (⧉)

Body and chassis
- Related: Ford Falcon; Ford Fairlane; Ford Econoline

Powertrain
- Engine: 144 cu in (2.4 L) 90 hp Thriftpower I6; 170 cu in (2.8 L) Thriftpower I6; 200 cu in (3.3 L) Thriftpower I6; 260 cu in (4.3 L) Windsor V8; 289 cu in (4.7 L) Windsor V8
- Transmission: 3-speed manual 4-speed manual 3-speed Cruise-O-Matic automatic 3-speed C4 automatic

Dimensions
- Wheelbase: 109.9 in (2,791 mm)
- Length: 189.0 in (4,801 mm)
- Width: 70.0 in (1,778 mm)
- Curb weight: 2,475 lb (1,123 kg)

In 1960, the Ranchero became much smaller, based on Ford's compact Falcon, specifically the two-door sedan delivery variant. The popularity of small, economical cars like the Volkswagen Beetle perpetuated a shift in thinking among the three largest American manufacturers; 1959 had the introduction of the 1960 Falcon along with the 1960 Chevrolet Corvair and Plymouth Valiant. A pickup version of the Volkswagen Bus and a van based on the Chevrolet Corvair were offered, as well. The economic recession of the late 1950s also certainly played a role. Ford believed the market wanted a more practical vehicle, one much smaller, lighter, and cheaper than a full-sized pickup truck, and indeed the Ranchero sold well in this incarnation. Now marketed in print as the "Falcon Ranchero", the new vehicle's standard powerplant was an economical 144 cu in (2.4 L) straight-6. In 1961, the 170 cu in (2.8 L) straight-6 was offered, and in 1963, the optional 260 cu in (4.3 L) V8 was offered in addition to the 144 and 170. The two-speed Ford-O-Matic automatic transmission (offered between 1960 and 1963) or three-speed C4 Cruise-O-Matic could be ordered as could a three-speed manual transmission. The Ranchero had an 800-lb load capacity.

Three almost entirely different coupé utility bodies were available for this generation of Falcon: the Australian Falcon Utility differed in having a shorter rear overhang than North American models, a cargo box that extended farther forward than the rear window, and shorter doors, while the Argentinian version also shared the sedan's overall length and short "four-door" doors, adding higher and more squared-off cargo box sides.

The Ranchero evolved along with the Falcon in 1964, becoming just a little larger along with its parent and using the same basic body style for 1964 and 1965. In 1965, the 289 cu in (4.7 L) V8 replaced the discontinued 260 and an alternator replaced the generator in all Ford cars.

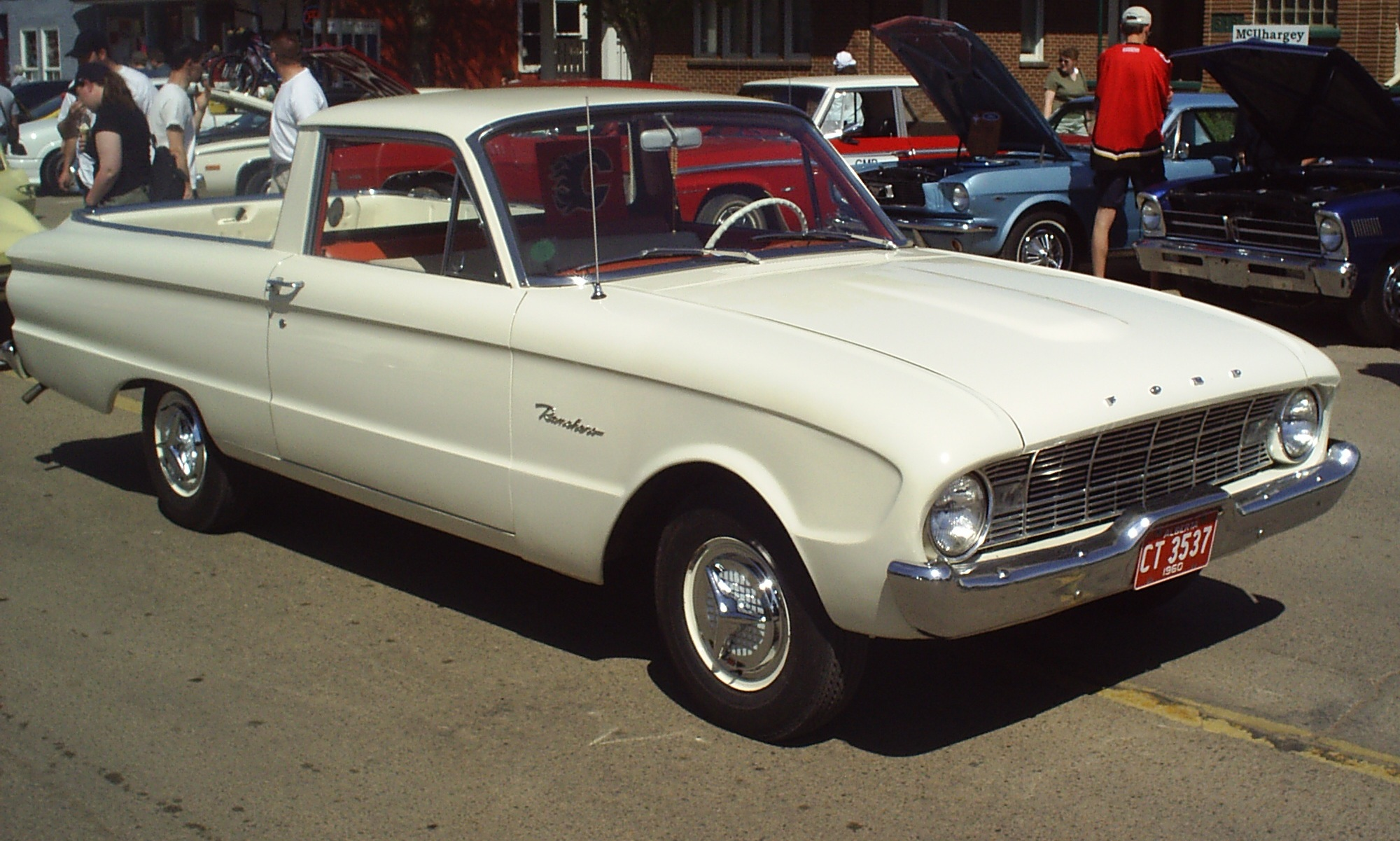
1960 Ford Falcon Ranchero

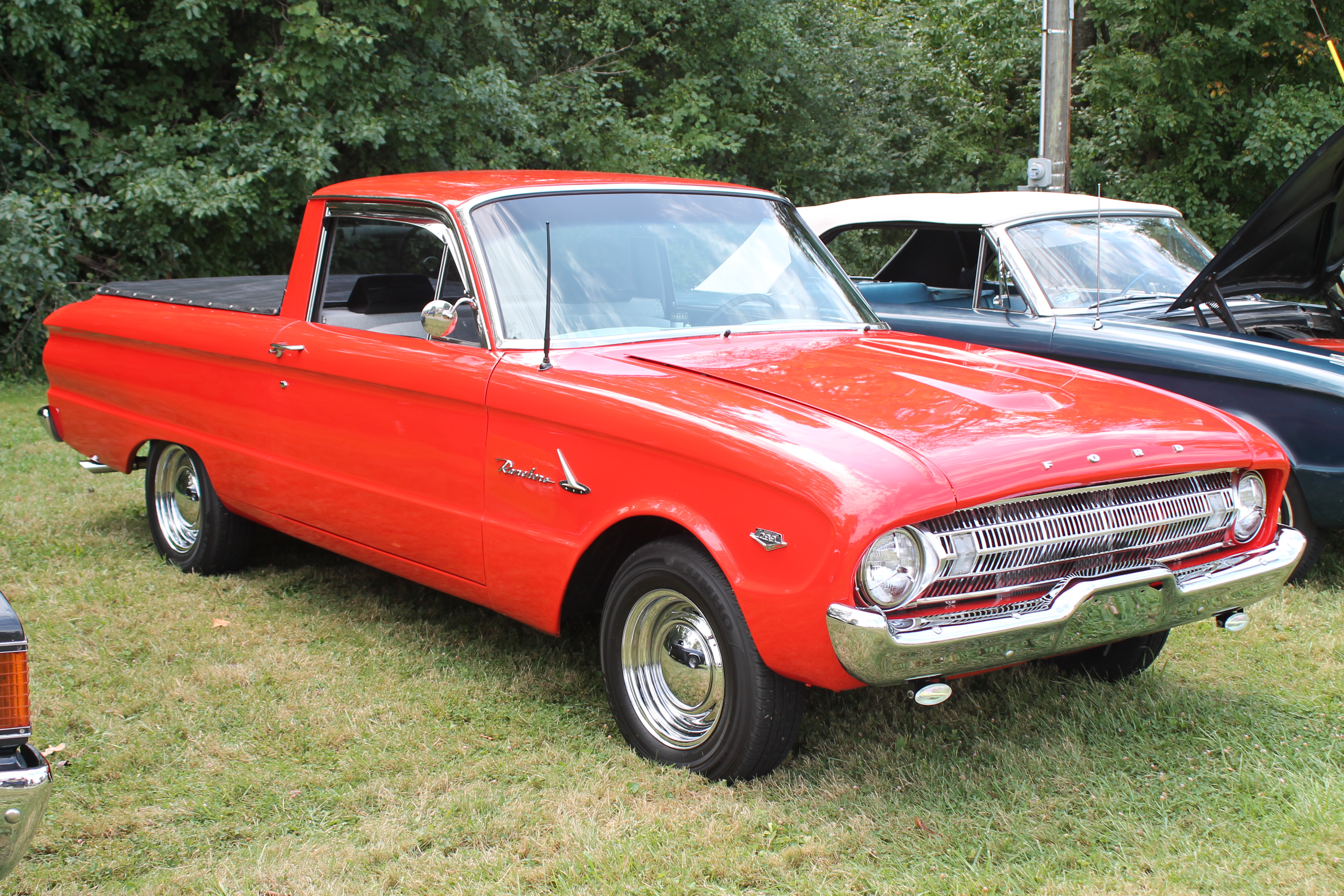
1961 Ford Falcon Ranchero

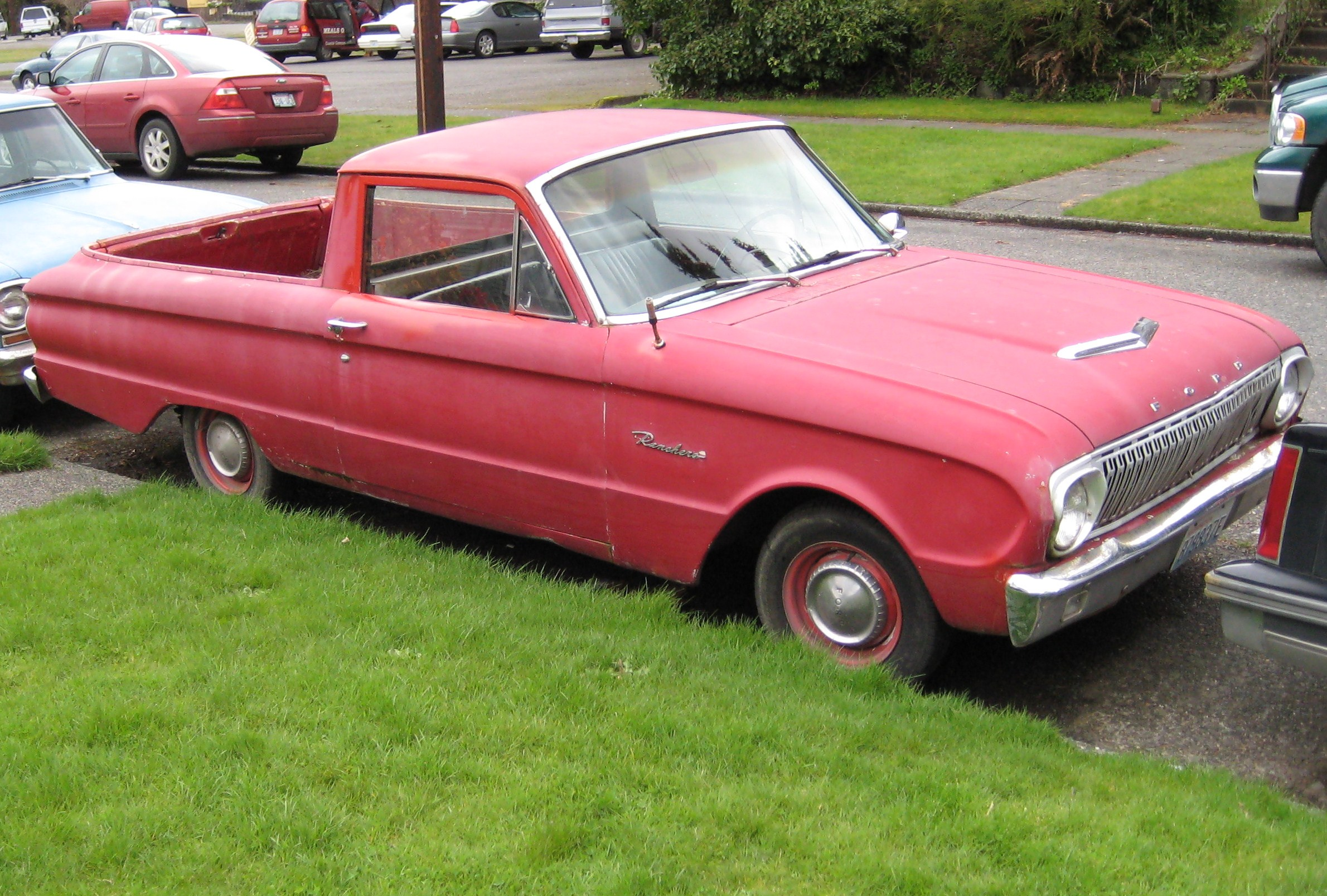
1962 Ford Falcon Ranchero

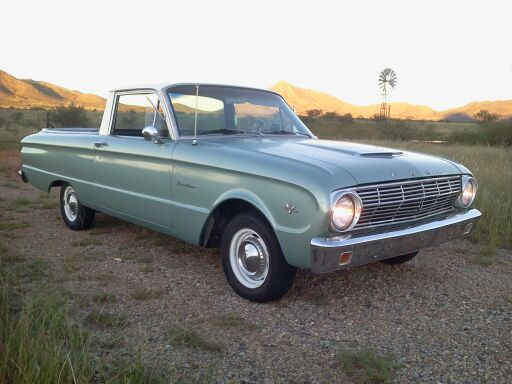
1963 Ford Falcon Ranchero

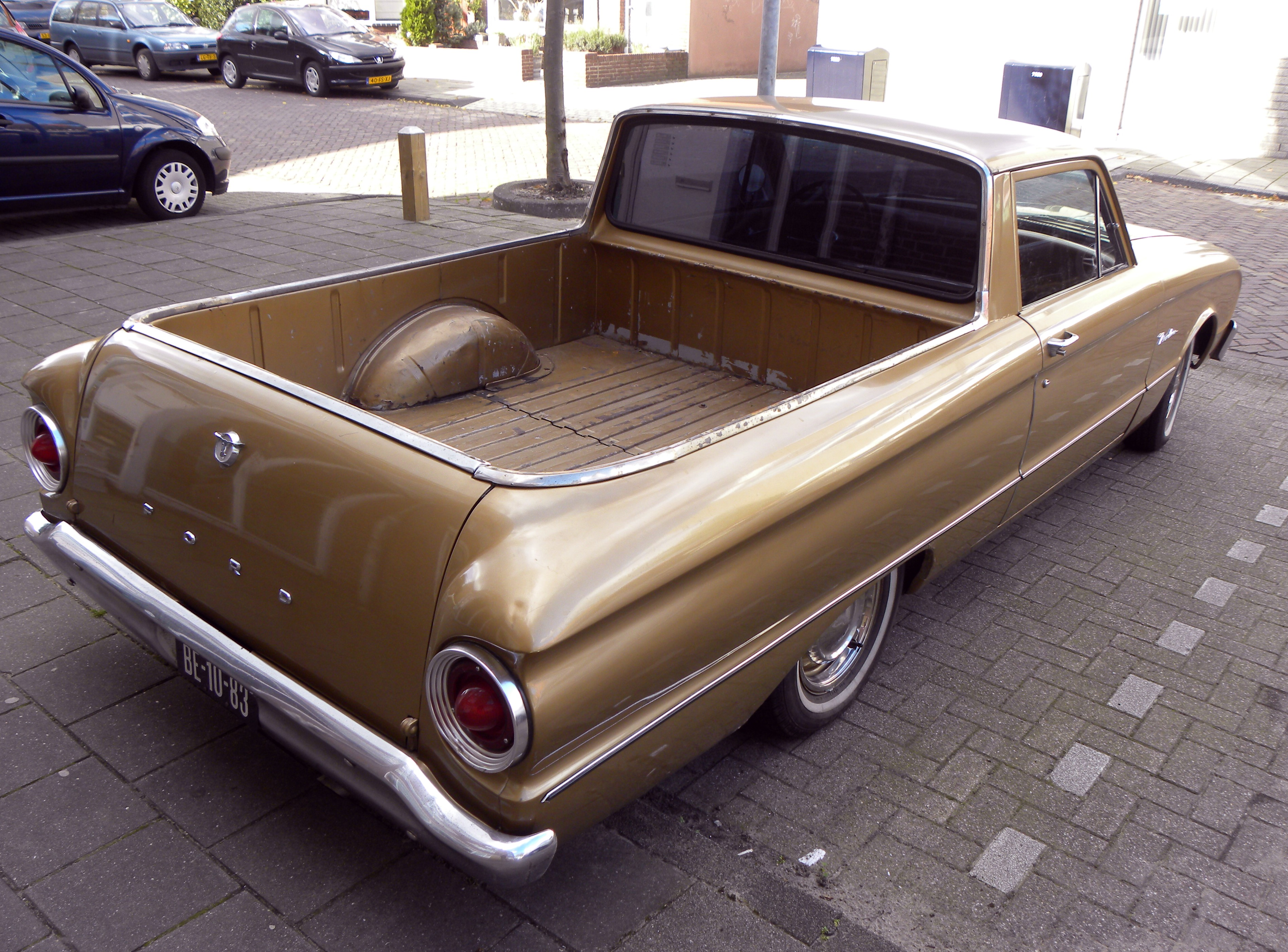
1963 Ford Falcon Ranchero

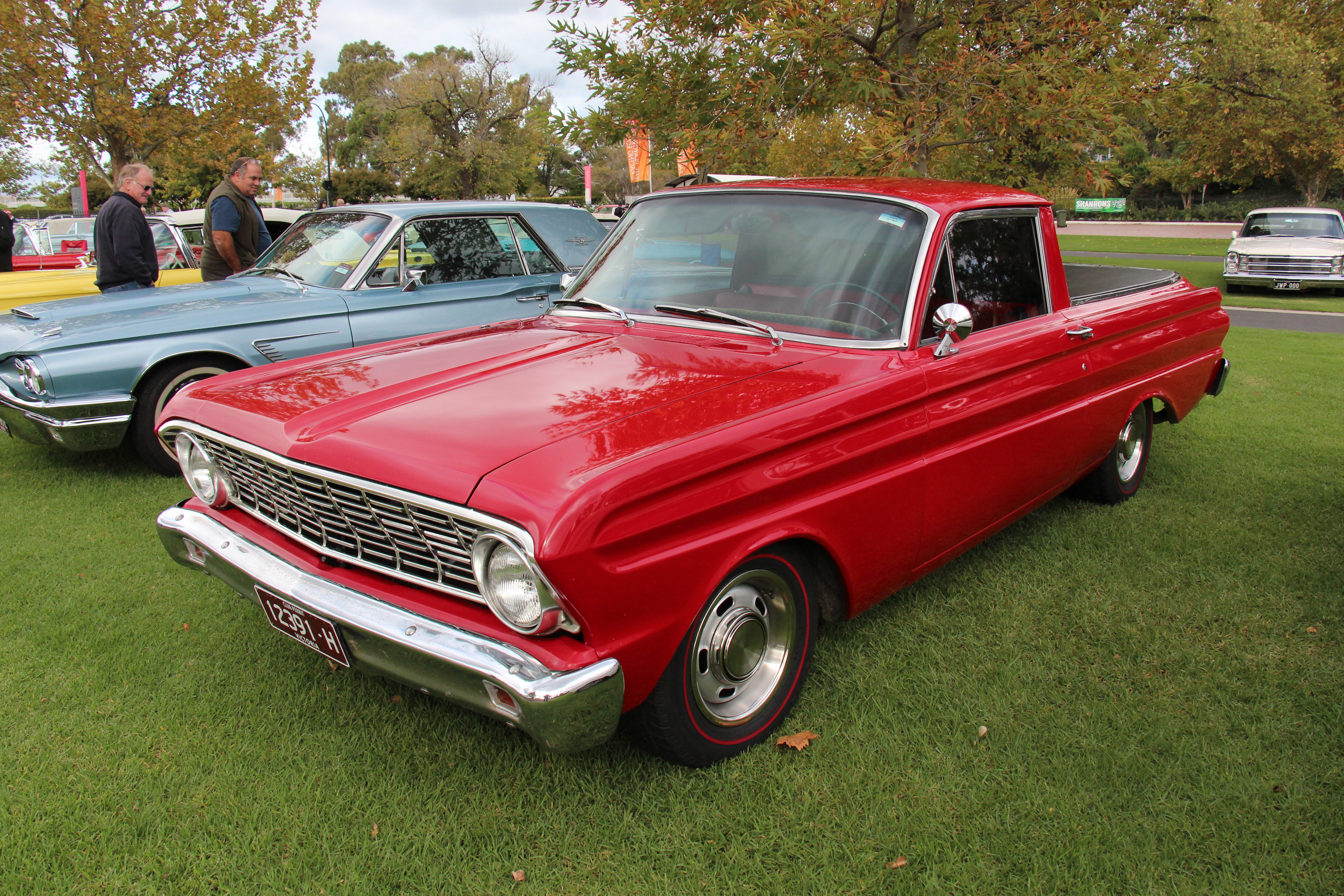
1964 Ford Falcon Ranchero

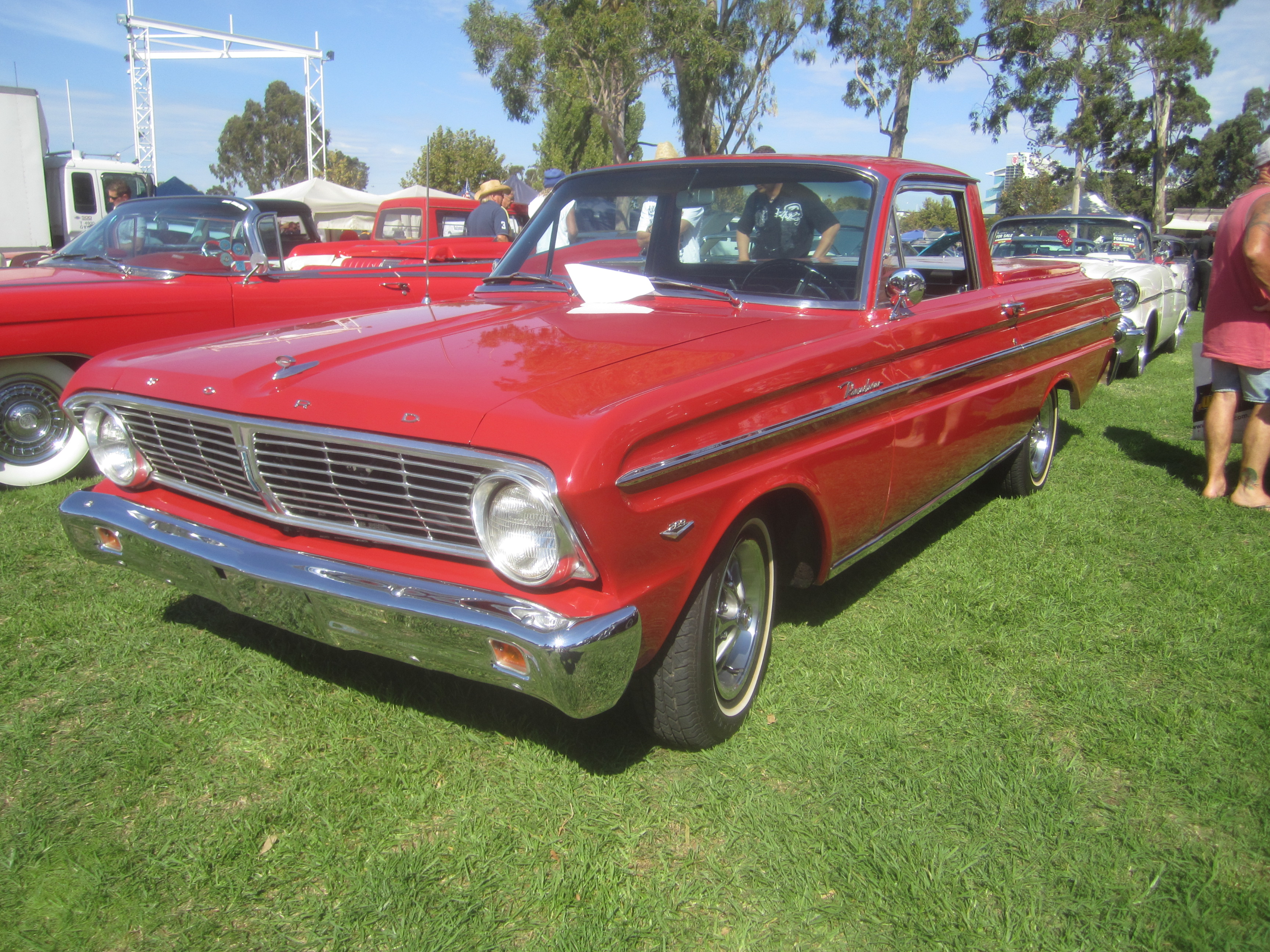
1965 Ford Falcon Ranchero

== Third generation (1966–1967) ==
Third generation
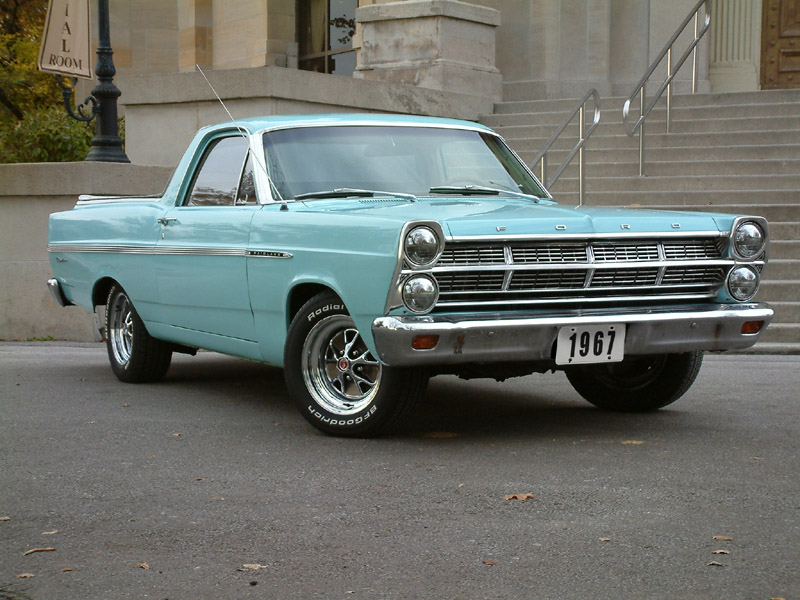
- 1967 Ford Fairlane Ranchero

Overview
- Production: 1966–1967
- Assembly: Lorain, Ohio, United States (⧉); Kansas City, MO, United States (⧉)

Body and chassis
- Related: Ford Falcon; Ford Fairlane

Powertrain
- Engine: 170 cu in (2.8 L) I6; 200 cu in (3.3 L) I6; 289 cu in (4.7 L) V8; 390 cu in (6.4 L) V8
- Transmission: 3-speed automatic 3-speed manual 4-speed manual

Dimensions
- Wheelbase: 113.0 in (2,870 mm)

The 1966 version was a one-year model, when Falcon and Fairlane were redeveloped on the same basic platform, one which did not include the sedan delivery, as 1965 marked the final year of sedan delivery production. Instead, the 1966 Ranchero used Falcon front sheet metal, trim, and interior accents on a modified station wagon platform although Rancheros made late in the '66 model year had the same front clip as the Fairlane. Engines available were the 170 cu in (2.8 L) I6, 200 cu in (3.3 L) I6, and two- and four-barrel versions of the 289 cu in (4.7 L) V8. Transmissions choices ranged from the C4 three-speed automatic to the three-speed column-shifted manual. The 1966 model was marketed simply as the Ford Ranchero, and did not carry Falcon badges. Seat belts were standard.

The 1967 Ranchero, based on the post-'66 Falcon/Fairlane chassis, used the basic 1966 Ranchero body with Fairlane trim, front sheet metal, and interior treatments instead of Falcon. It was marketed as the Fairlane Ranchero.

Engine options started with a 200 cu in (3.3 L) straight-6 for the base model to a 390 cu in (6.4 L) FE-series V8 which had 315 bhp (234.9 kW) and also had an optional C6 automatic gearbox, the heavy duty variant of the C4 in addition to the Toploader 4-speed manual gearbox. The 1967 model also had the largest expansion of trim levels since the vehicle's introduction 10 years prior. Supplementing the base model were the new Ranchero 500 and 500/XL. Even though they were added to the Fairlane family for 1967, Ford's top performance options for the Fairlane, the GT and the GTA, did not apply to the Ranchero and is a common misconception that they were available.

What did apply to all American cars in 1967 was the use of a dual-circuit braking system with a dual-chambered master cylinder. Increased awareness of passenger safety resulted in such innovations as safety-padded windshield pillars and an unusual 1967-only safety pad which protruded from the center of the three-spoked steering wheel to a point just beyond the rim of the steering wheel. It was designed to minimize abdominal injuries in the event of a collision.

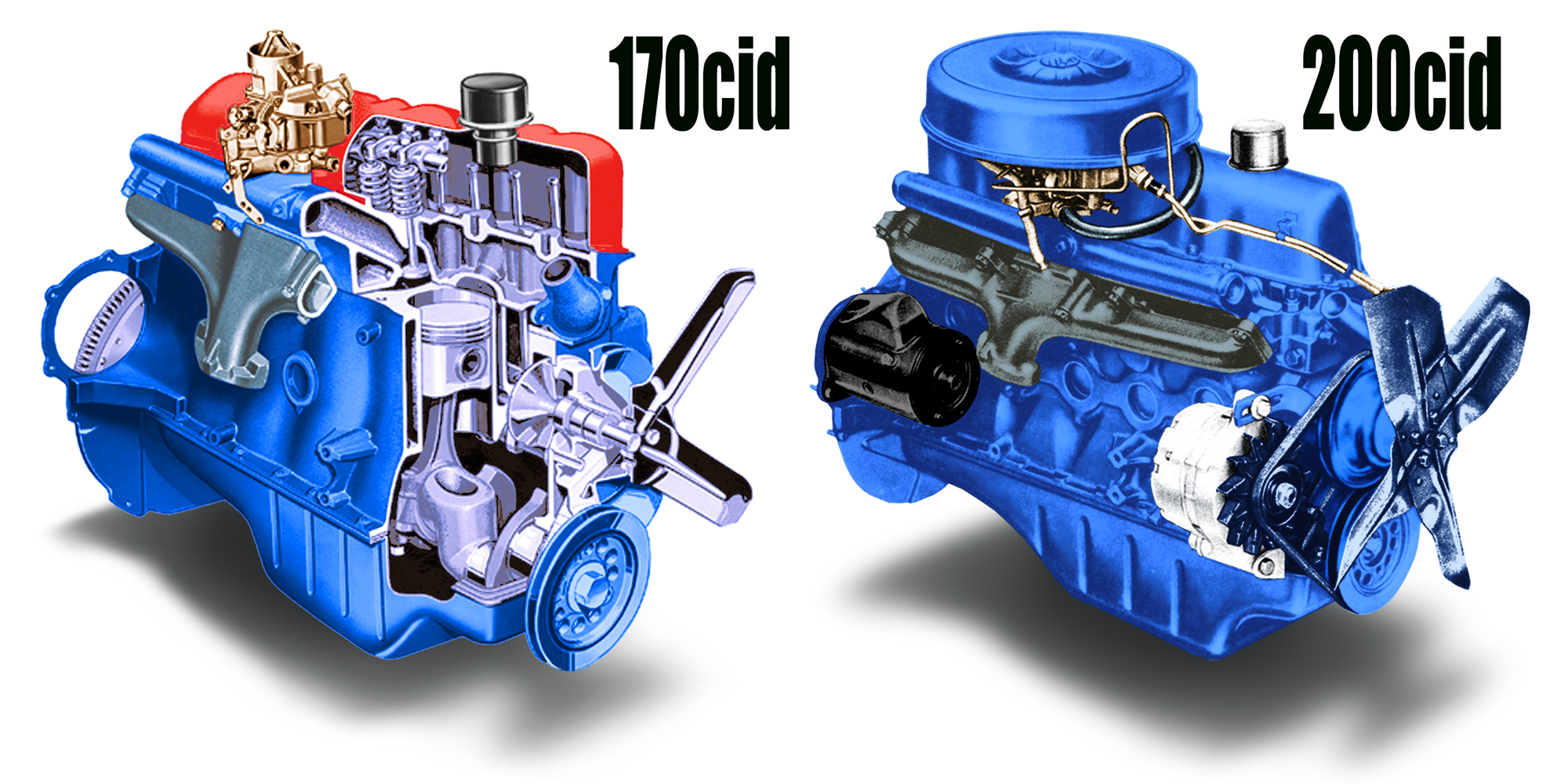
Schematic of Ford's 170 and 200 cid engines used in their automobiles from the early 1960s to 1980s

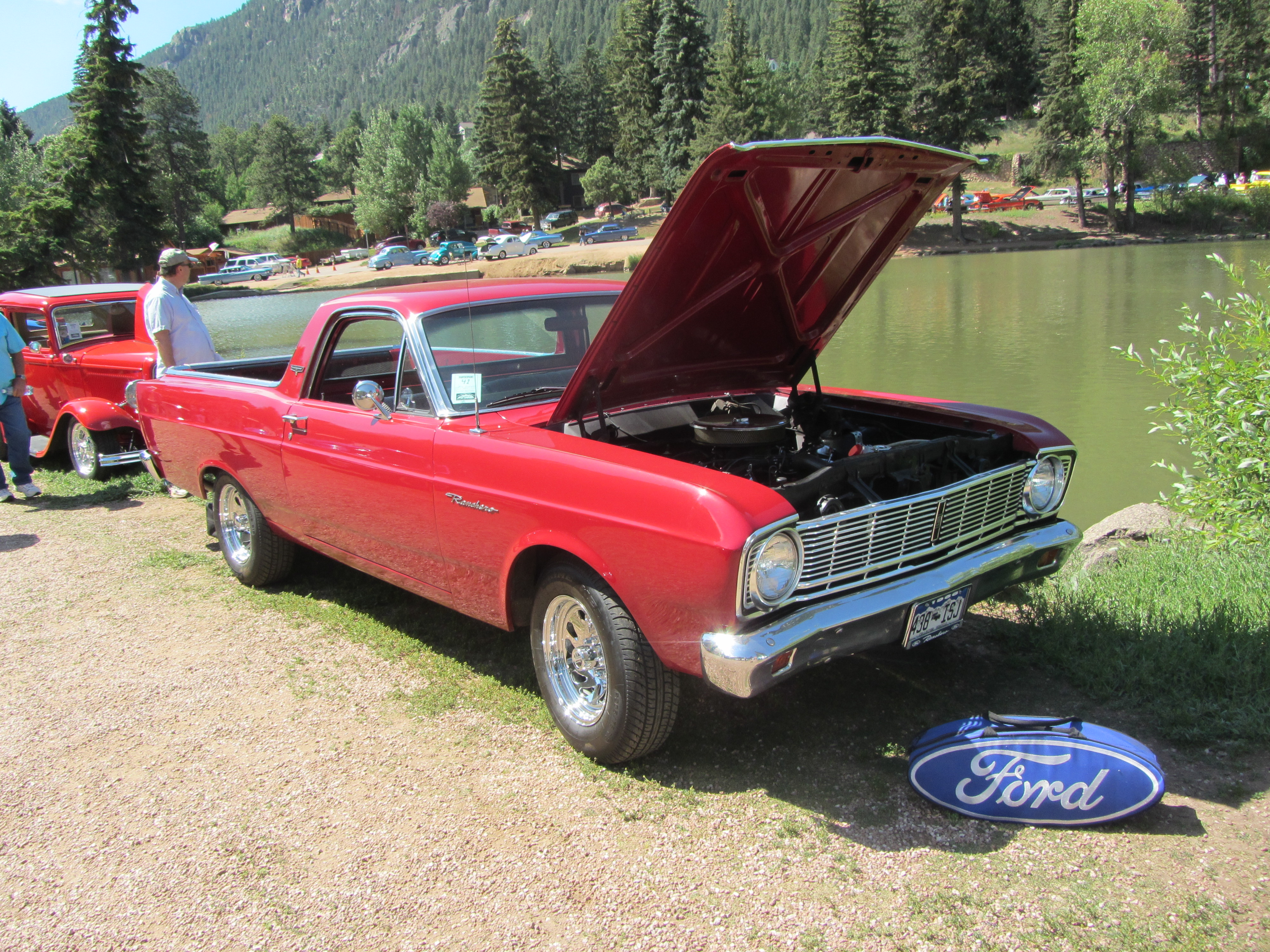
1966 Ford Ranchero

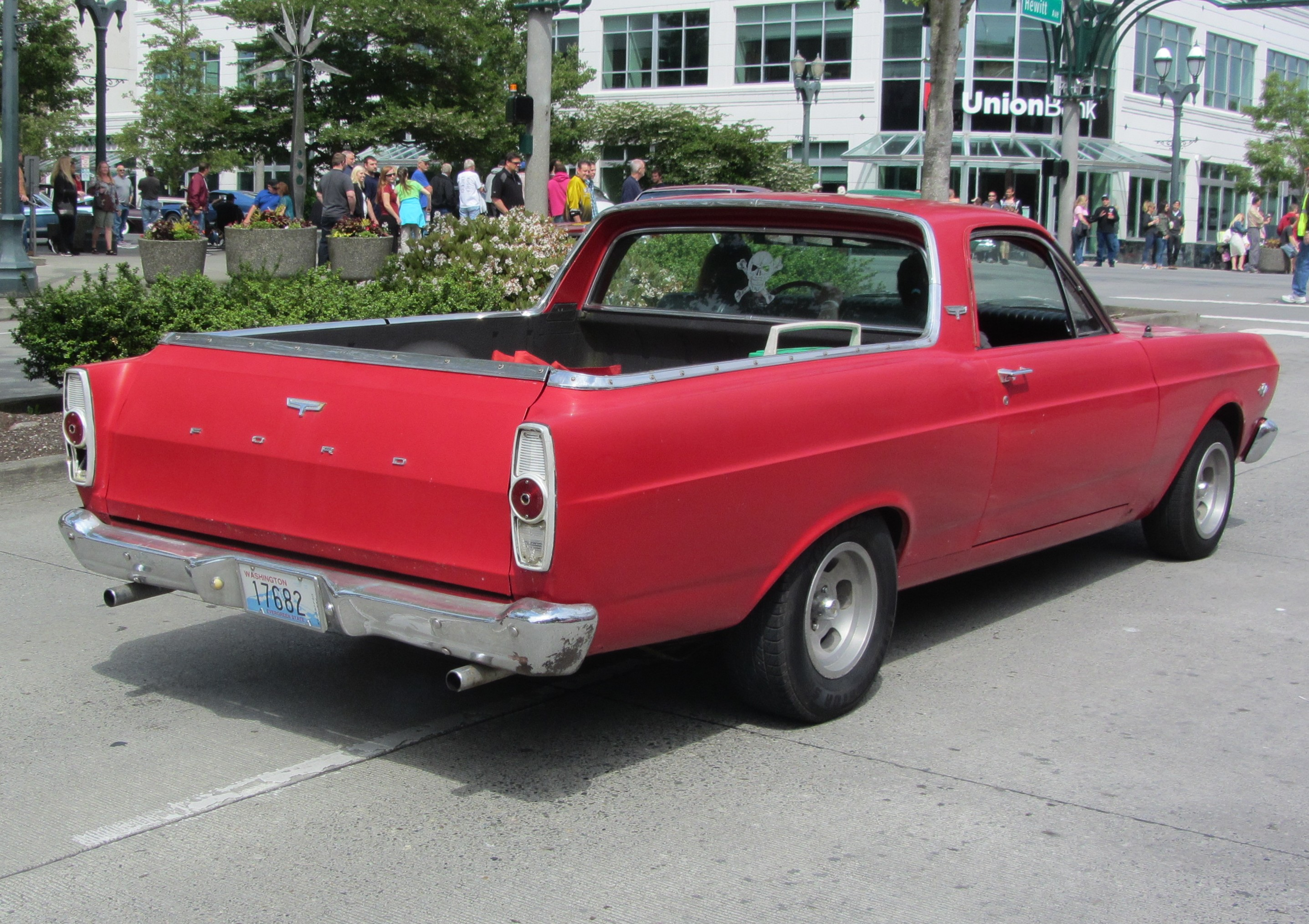
1966 Ford Ranchero, rear

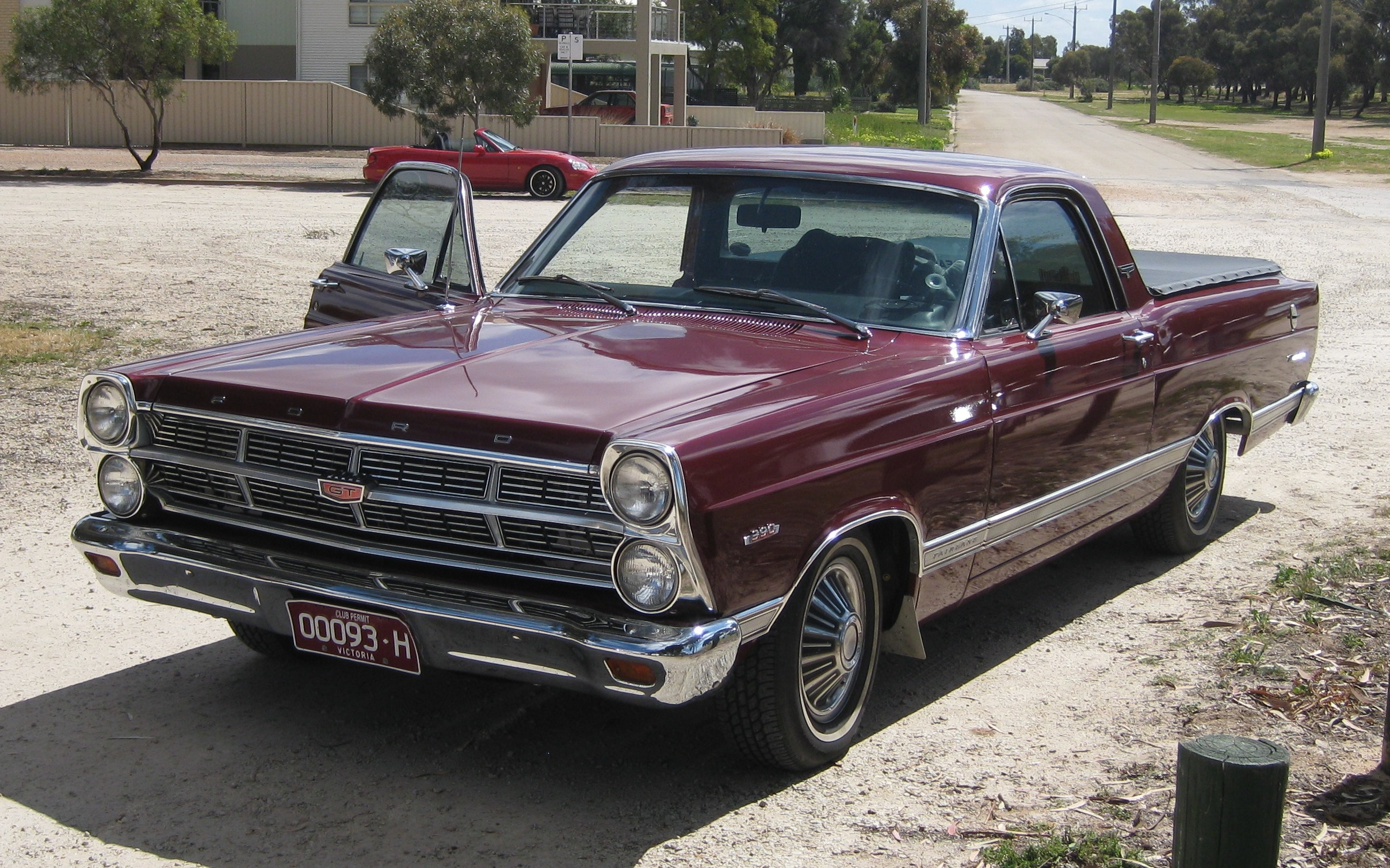
1967 Ford Fairlane 500 Ranchero

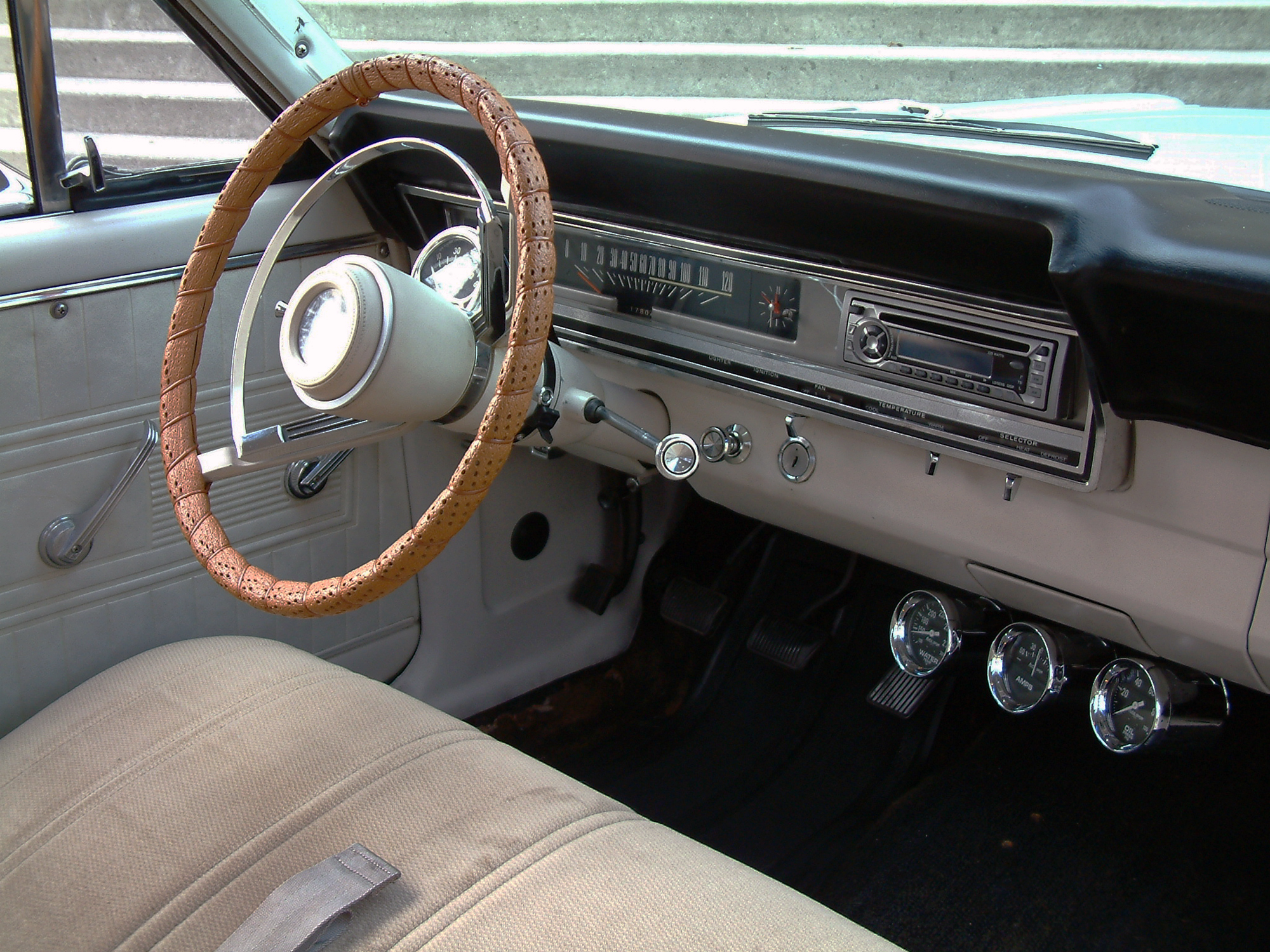
Interior image of a 1967 Ford Ranchero with bench seat and three-speed shifter on the steering column

== Fourth generation (1968–1969) ==
Fourth generation
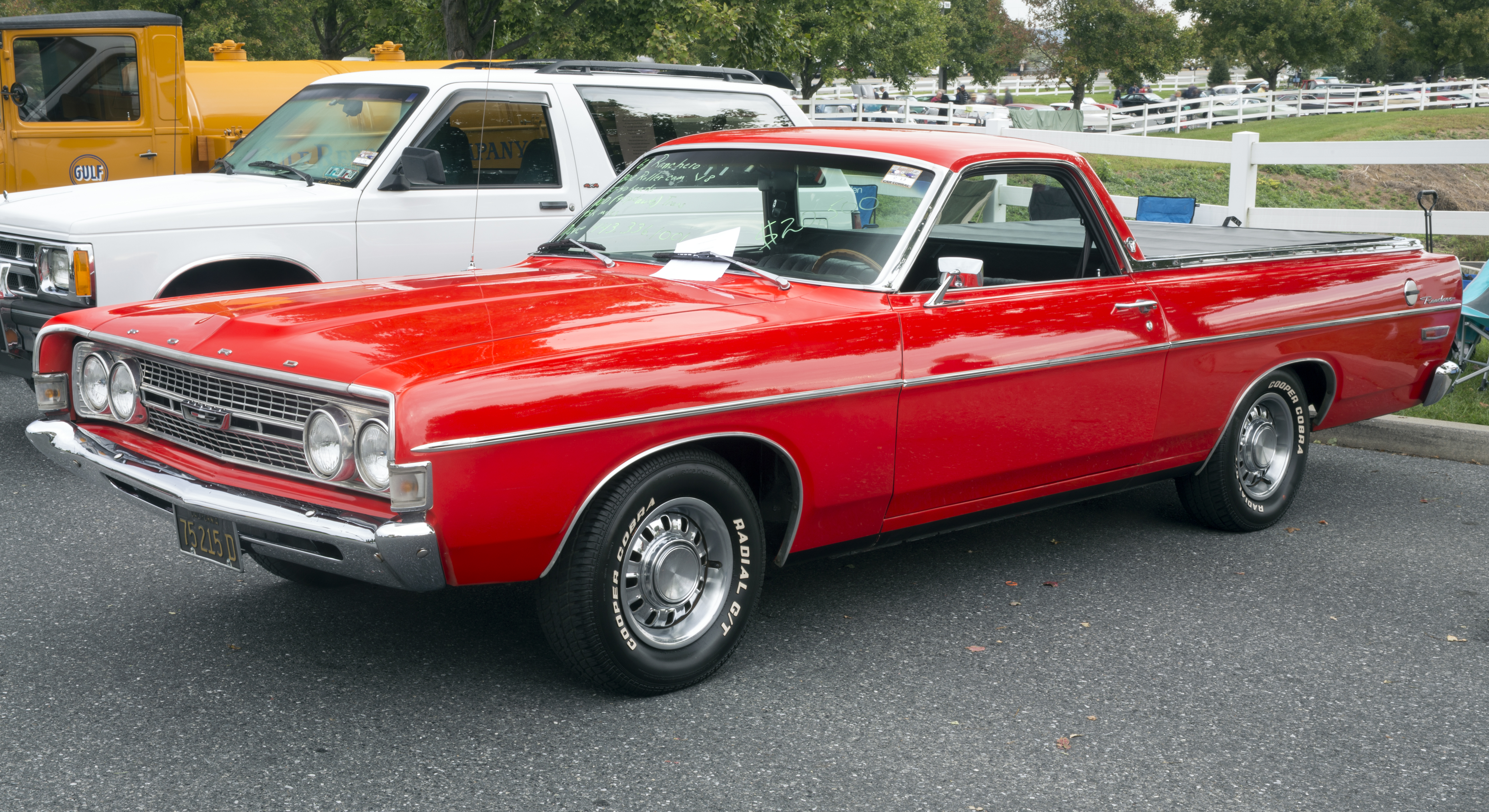
- 1968 Ford Ranchero 500 (with non-standard wheels)

Overview
- Production: 1968–1969
- Assembly: Lorain, Ohio, United States (⧉); Atlanta, Georgia, United States (⧉)

Body and chassis
- Related: Ford Fairlane; Ford Torino; Mercury Montego

Powertrain
- Engine: 250 cu in (4.1 L) I6; 289 cu in (4.7 L) V8; 390 cu in (6.4 L) V8; 428 cu in (7.0 L) V8; 302 cu in (4.9 L) V8; 351 cu in (5.8 L) V8
- Transmission: 3-speed manual 4-speed manual 3 speed automatic

Dimensions
- Wheelbase: 113.0 in (2,870 mm)

In 1968, the Fairlane line was supplemented by the new Torino, and the Ranchero followed suit, becoming the largest model since the full-sized 1959. Overall, the new Ranchero was not only bigger, but also more angular than before with its more horizontal grille and horizontal headlamps; Ford and other automakers were making a switch back to horizontal quad headlamps. The interior was all new, as well, sharing the Torino/Fairlane's distinctive four-pod instrument cluster. Though the four round pods gave the illusion of an engine-turned dash, viewed from left to right, they instead featured warning lights for coolant temperature (both cold and hot) and the left turn signal indicator in the left pod with the speedometer in the second pod directly in front of the driver. Warning lights for the charging system and oil pressure, as well as the right turn signal indicator, were located third from the left. In upscale models, this pod was supplanted by a tachometer. An optional clock filled the fourth pod; a decorative "clock delete" panel otherwise filled the space. A seat belt warning light was a new feature, too, lighting briefly in the far left pod whenever the engine was started. The model line also featured wraparound front side marker lamps which doubled as parking lights and rear side reflectors, newly mandated by US law for the 1968 model year.

Three trim levels were offered, beginning with the sparsely trimmed base Ranchero, the Ranchero 500 trimmed like the corresponding Fairlane 500, and the top-of-the line Ranchero GT with its Torino GT trim. Engine choices began with the 250 cubic inch I6 and ran to several V8 choices, including the standard 289 with two-barrel carburetor, and the FE-based 390. The powerful 428 cu in (7.0 L) Cobra Jet, another FE derivative and the largest engine offered in the Ranchero to date, was a mid-1968 option. The 1968 model marked the final year of production of the 289; a 302 cu in (4.9 L) V8 with two-barrel carburetor became the standard V8 in 1969. Two new upmarket engine choices were available, the 351 Windsor with two- and four-barrel carburetion. The FMX automatic was available with both, which was a variant of the old Cruise-o-Matic and was offered exclusively with either 351.

Like the Torino/Fairlane, the Ranchero could be had with virtually all of the same options as its cousins, including air conditioning, bucket seats, center console, AM/FM radio, optional wheels, front power disc brakes, hood scoop (standard on GT), and even a vinyl top. Changes across the 1969 model line were slight and included a flatter three-piece grille less the horizontal crossbar and Ford crest, relocation of GT grille badging from the crest to the lower right corner of the grille as viewed from the front, a change from black-faced instruments with white numerals to brushed aluminum with black numerals and a slimmer, two-spoke steering wheel pad similar to those across the Ford product line, unlike the wheel with its broader "safety pad" and separate horn ring used in the 1968 intermediates and compacts. While the pad may have changed, the horn ring did not. The only change unique to the Ranchero was the relocation of the "Ranchero" script from the rear quarter panels to the front fenders.

A little-known and extremely rare offering in 1969 was the Rio Grande. Available on special order, this was essentially a GT in the so-called "Grabber" colors of "Wimbledon White", "Poppy Red" or "Calypso Coral", partially blacked-out hood with scoop, side stripes, bed rails, vinyl top, and unique "Ford Ranchero Rio Grande" wheel centers. As a result, Rancheros so equipped received Ford's "Special Performance Vehicle" identification on the data plate regardless of engine choice. These vehicles may be identified by the aforementioned designation, as well as a blank space where the trim code would normally be found. Production figures are unclear, but may have been around 900 total units.

At the Detroit motor show in 1969 was shown a concept car Ford Scrambler, some elements of which were used in the next models of Ford Ranchero.

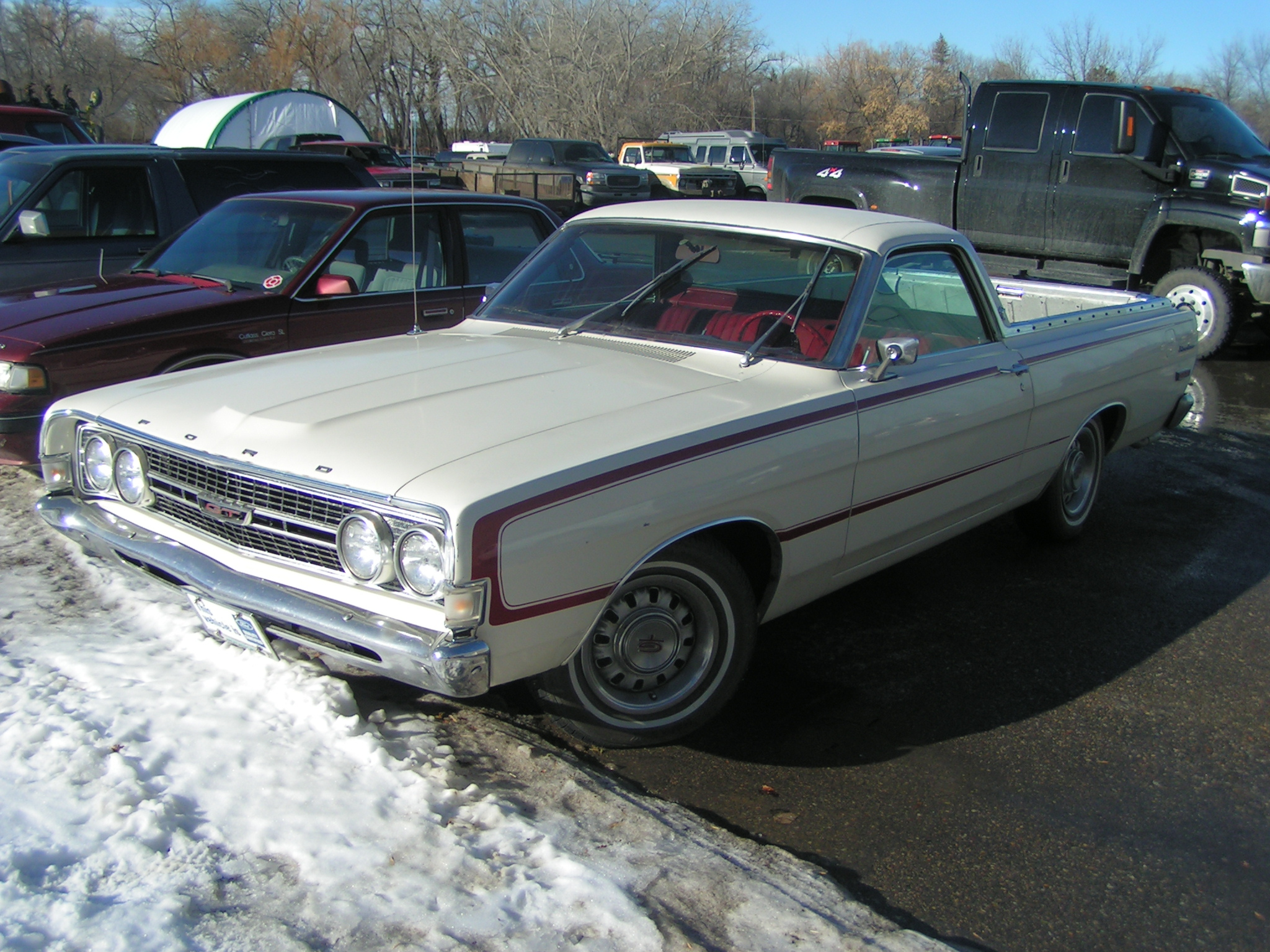
1968 Ford Ranchero GT

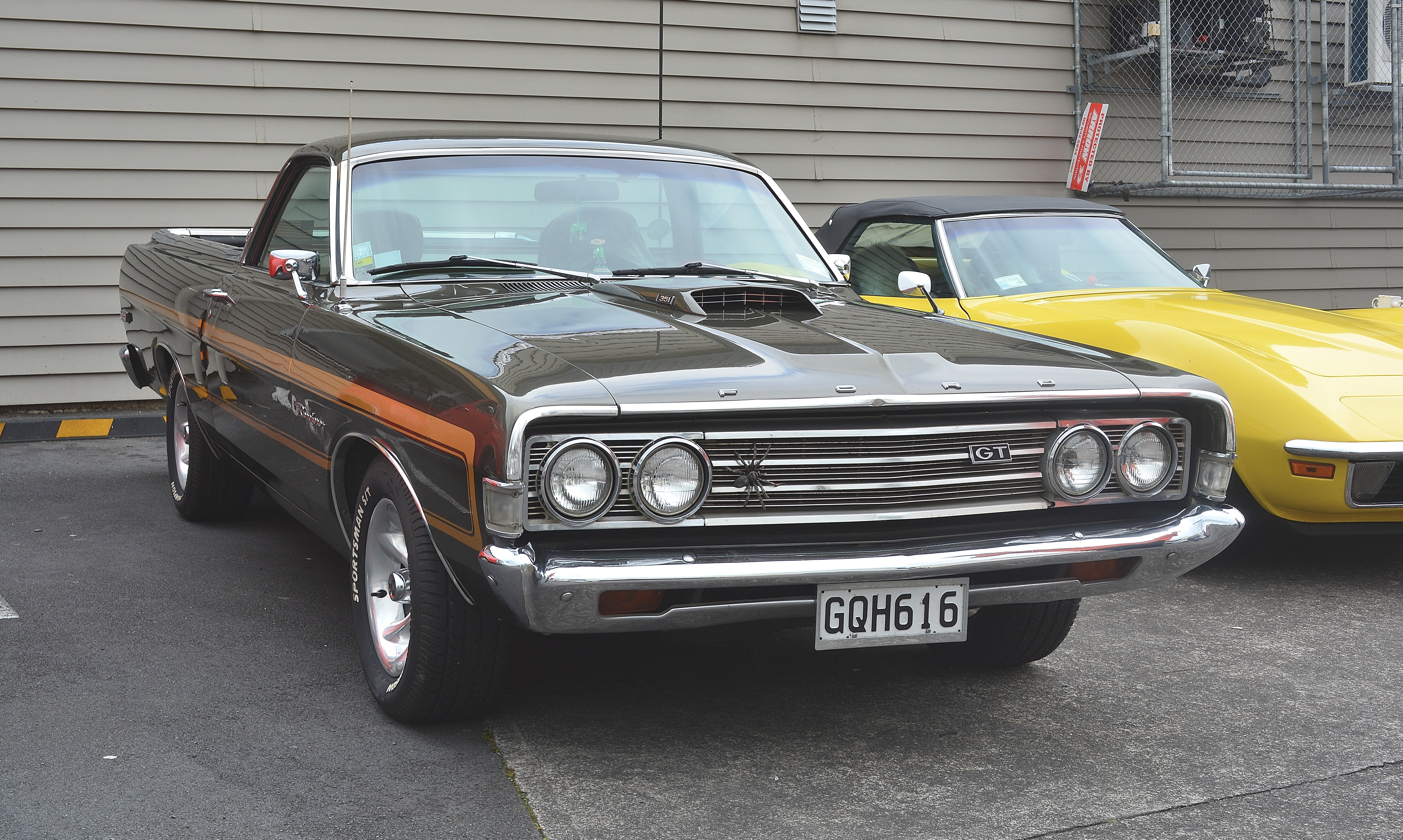
1969 Ford Ranchero GT (with after-market-wheels)

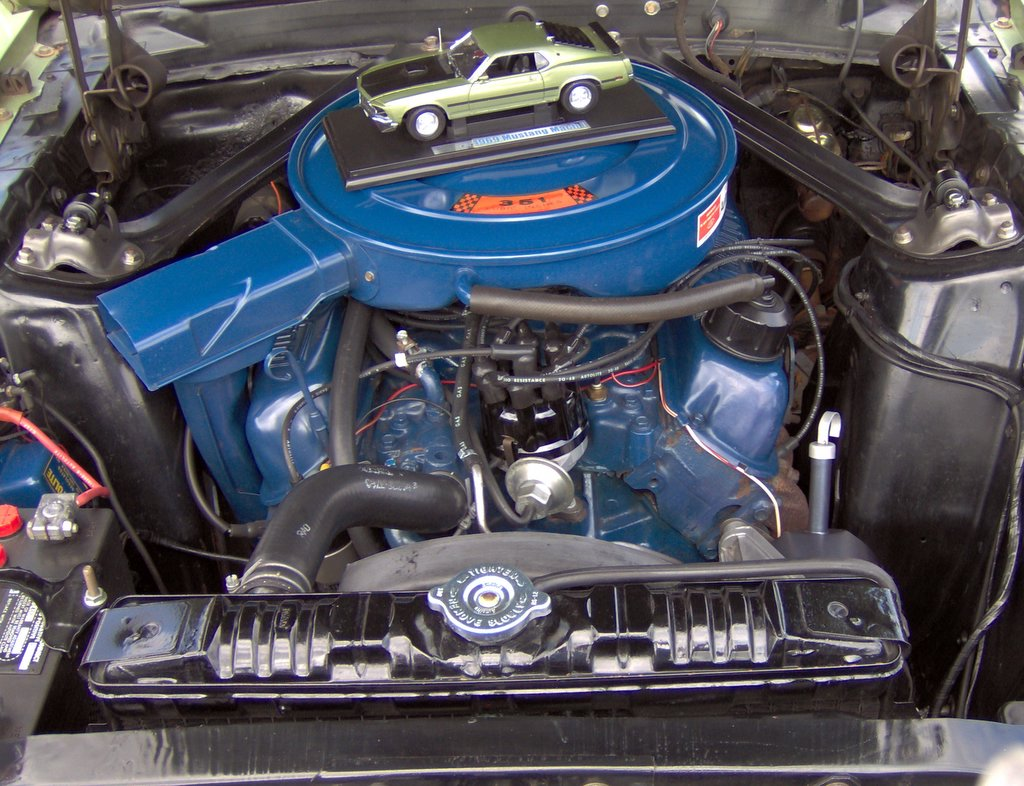
A 351 Windsor V8 engine from a 1969 Ford Mustang. The Ranchero's installation was similar.

== Fifth generation (1970–1971) ==
Fifth generation
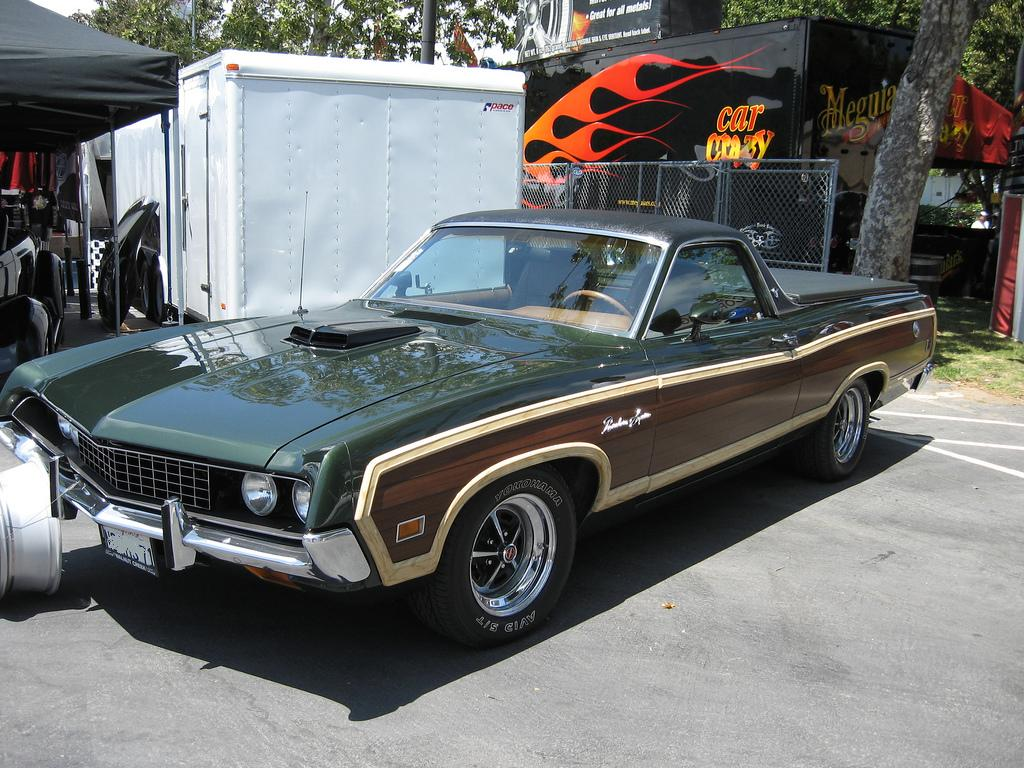
- 1970 Ford Ranchero Squire

Overview
- Production: 1970–1971
- Assembly: Lorain, Ohio, United States (⧉)

Body and chassis
- Related: Ford Torino; Mercury Montego

Powertrain
- Engine: 250 cu in (4.1 L) I6; 302 cu in (4.9 L) V8; 351 cu in (5.8 L) V8; 429 cu in (7.0 L) V8

Dimensions
- Wheelbase: 114.0 in (2,896 mm)

While Chevrolet's El Camino used the same body from 1968 to 1972, 1970 had a complete restyle for the Ranchero, which had started with a boxy body style. Both the Torino and Ranchero featured a shallow-pointed grille and front end with smooth, somewhat more curvaceous lines influenced by coke bottle styling. A fourth trim option was made available in 1970. The Ranchero Squire was an upmarket trim package which featured a woodgrain applique similar to that found on the Country Squire station wagon. Like in previous years, all Torino trim and engine options could be ordered, including all-new Ram-Air 429 Cobra Jet or Super Cobra Jet engines (7 L) with the new "shaker" hood scoop, so named because it was directly mounted to the carburetor and shook with the engine at idle. Also available was a stylish grille that featured hide-away headlamps, as well as an optional hood with an oversized scoop which was standard on Torino GTs. The 1971 is distinguished by a grille divided by a center section.

A minor but nevertheless important variation debuted with the 1970 model. Prior to 1970, no Ranchero had any interior badging identifying it as such. With the 1970 model came a "Ranchero" or "Ranchero GT" badge on the glove compartment rather than Fairlane or Torino badging.

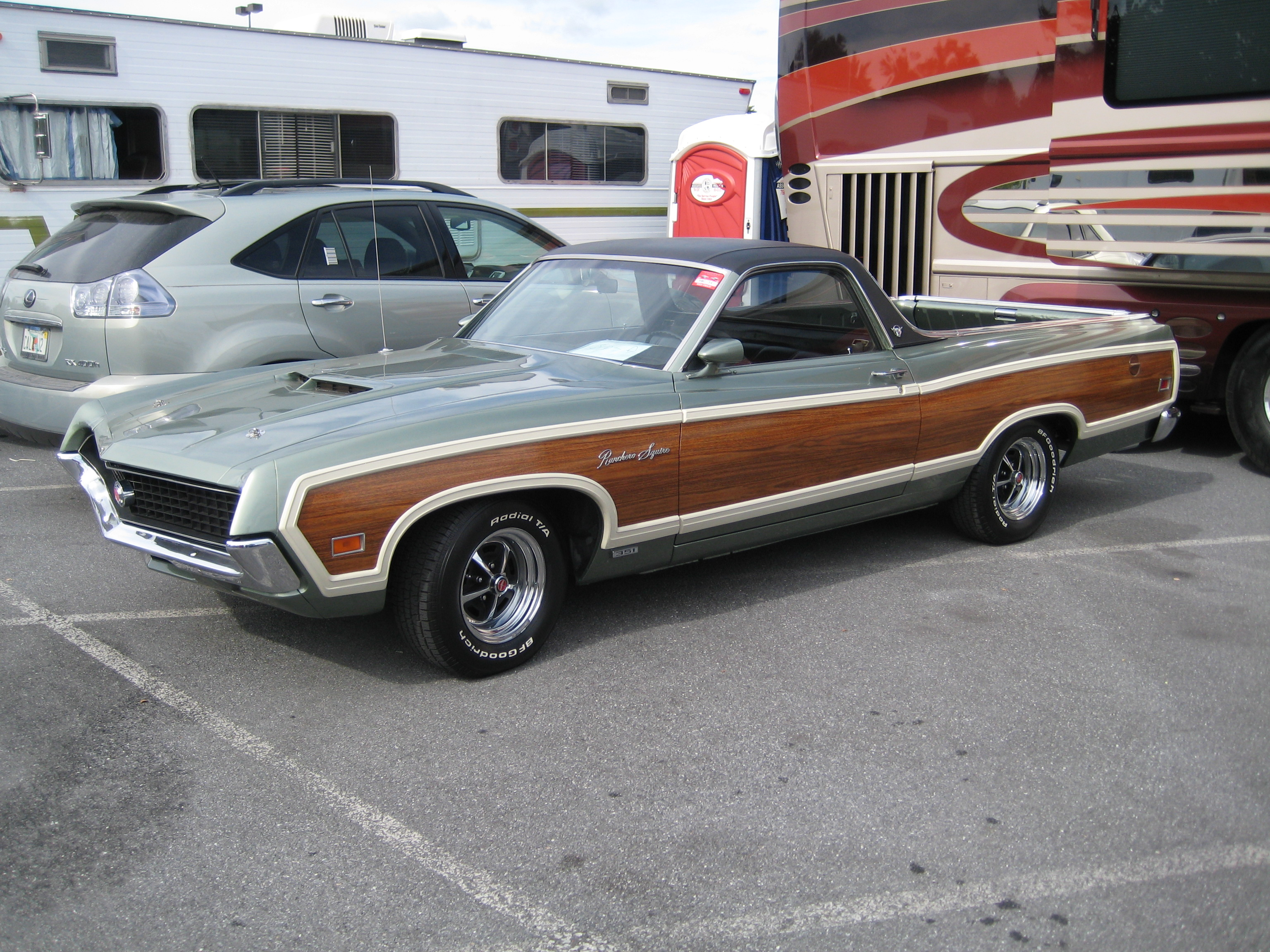
1970 Ford Ranchero Squire

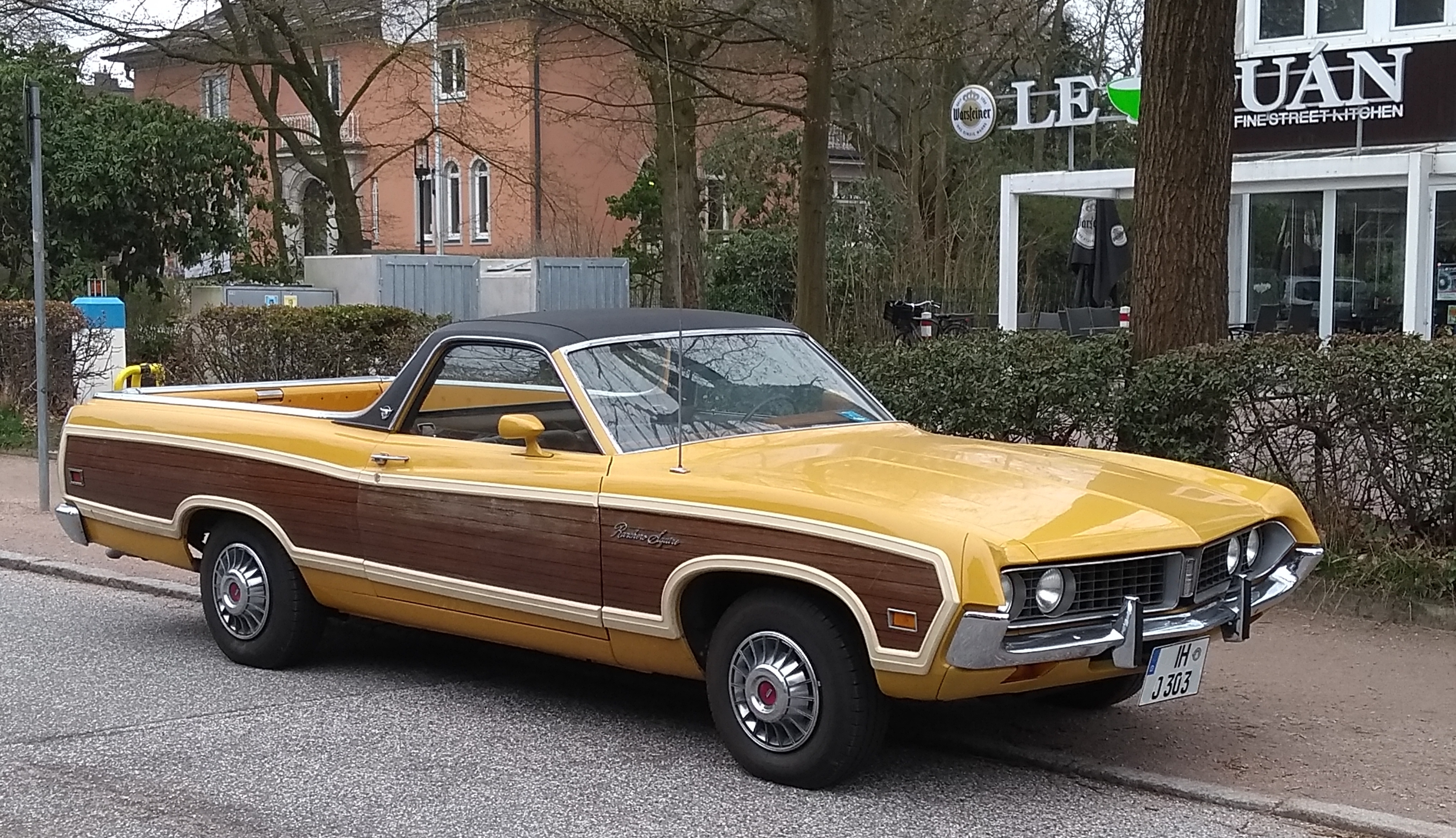
1971 Ford Ranchero Squire

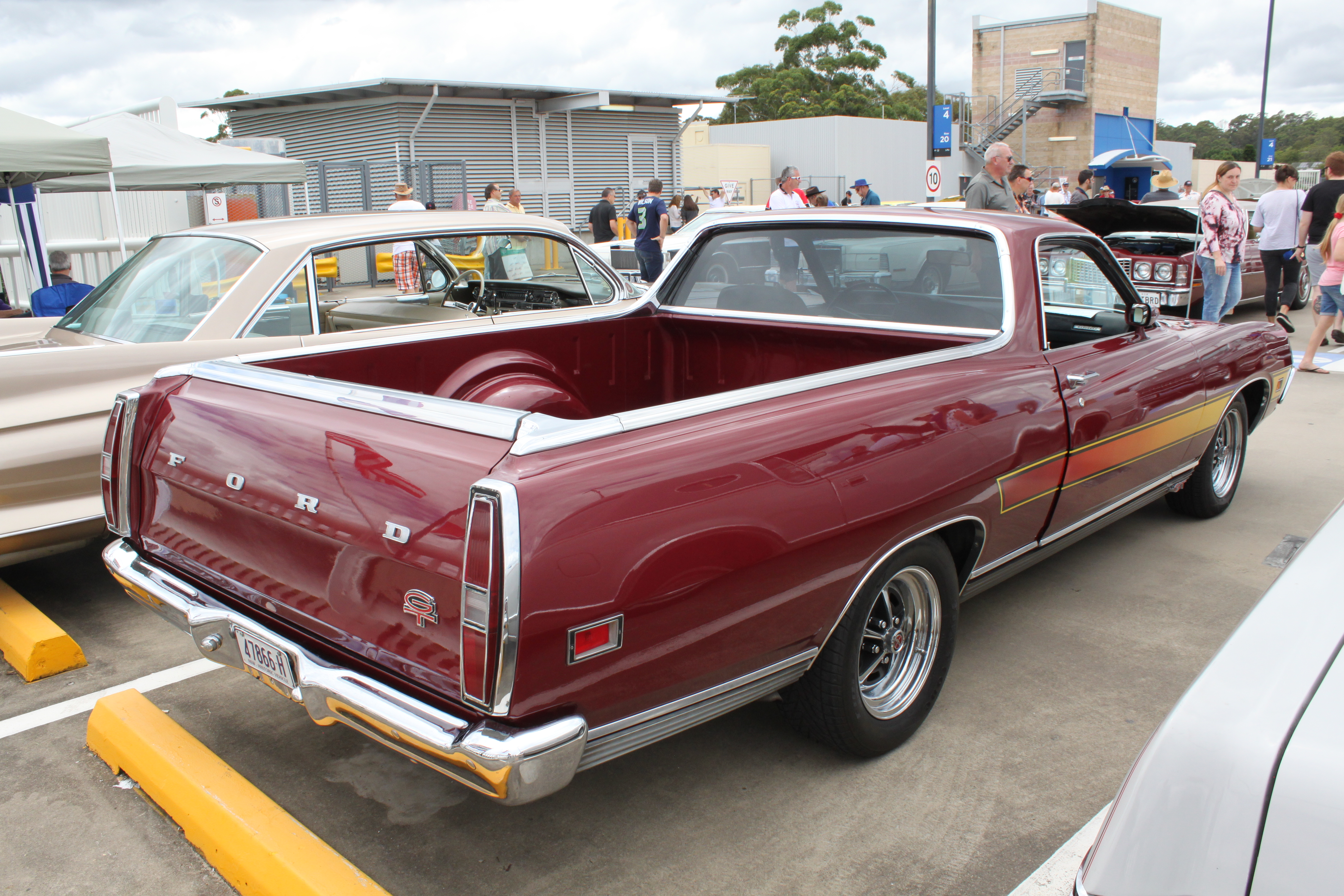
1971 Ford Ranchero GT rear

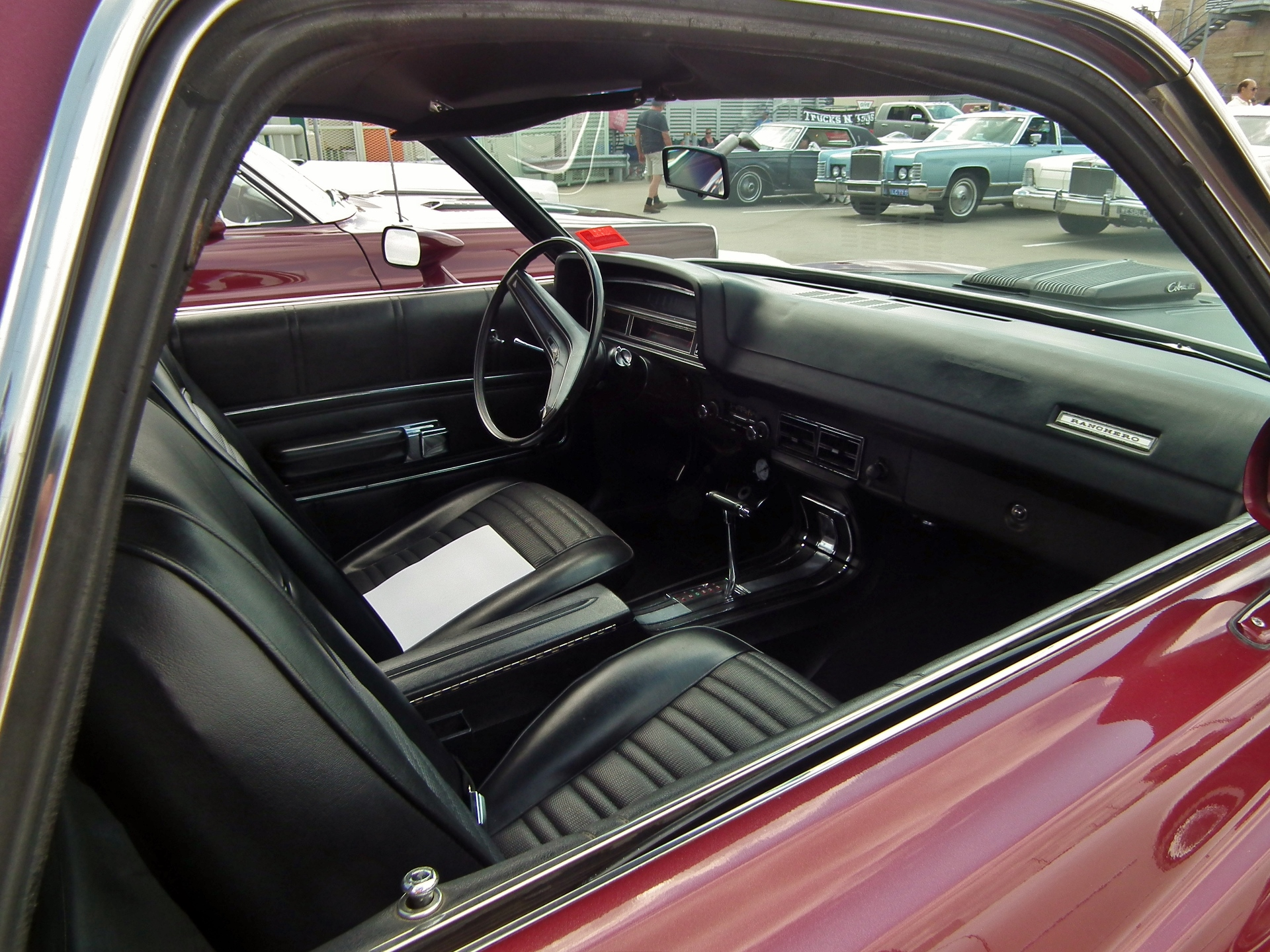
1971 Ford Ranchero GT interior

== Sixth generation (1972–1976) ==
Sixth generation
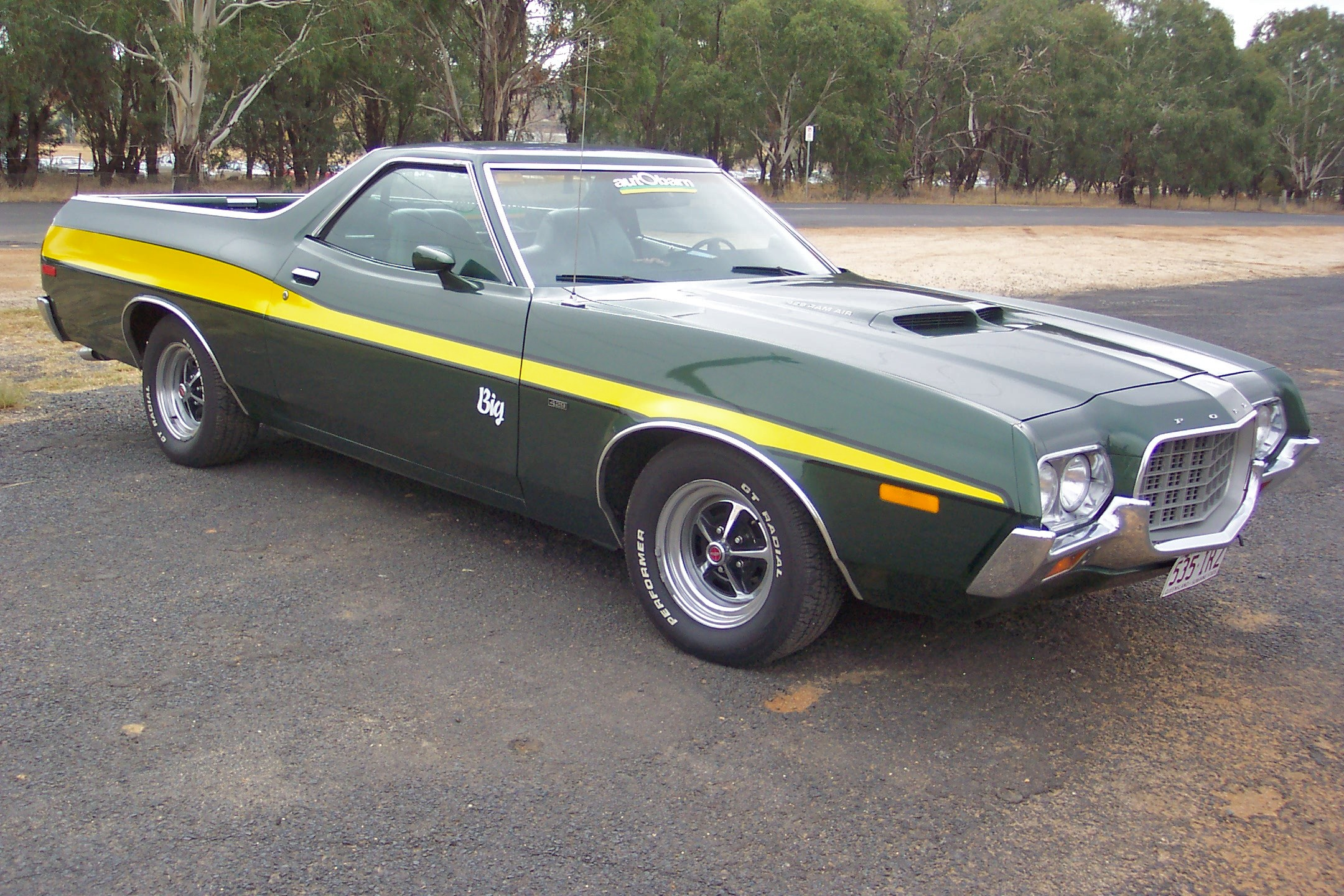
- 1972 Ford Ranchero GT

Overview
- Production: 1972–1976
- Assembly: Lorain, Ohio, United States (⧉); Atlanta, Georgia, United States (⧉)

Body and chassis
- Related: Ford Elite; Ford Torino; Mercury Montego; Mercury Cougar

Powertrain
- Engine: 250 cu in (4.1 L) I6; 302 cu in (4.9 L) V8; 351 cu in (5.8 L) V8; 400 cu in (6.6 L) V8; 429 cu in (7.0 L) V8; 460 cu in (7.5 L) V8
- Transmission: 4-speed manual 3-speed automatic

Dimensions
- Wheelbase: 118.0 in (2,997 mm)
- Length: 215.7 in (5,479 mm)
- Width: 79.0 in (2,007 mm)
- Height: 53.5 in (1,359 mm)

In 1972, a radical change occurred in the Torino and Ranchero lines. The sleek, pointy look of the previous year's model was replaced with a larger, heavier design. Most prominent was a wide semioval grille reminiscent of a jet intake and a new body-on-frame design. Three models were still available; the now-standard 500, the new Squire with simulated woodgrain "paneling" along the flanks, and the sporty GT. Engine choices remained basically the same beginning with the 250 cubic-inch six-cylinder and a selection of V8s that ranged from the standard 302 to Cleveland and Windsor series 351s, plus the new-for-1972 400. The 385-series V8 (the 429 for 1972–73; the 460 for 1974–76) was still available. However, all suffered from lower compression ratios to better meet new emissions standards. The 351 cu in (5.8 L) Cleveland could still be obtained in tuned 4-V Cobra Jet form through 1974. A four-speed manual transmission was available on Cobra Jet-powered models GT, Squire and 500.

The 1973 Ranchero had a redesigned front end to meet new federal standards for front impact protection. Aside from slight cosmetic differences, the Ranchero remained basically the same until the Torino's final year, 1976.

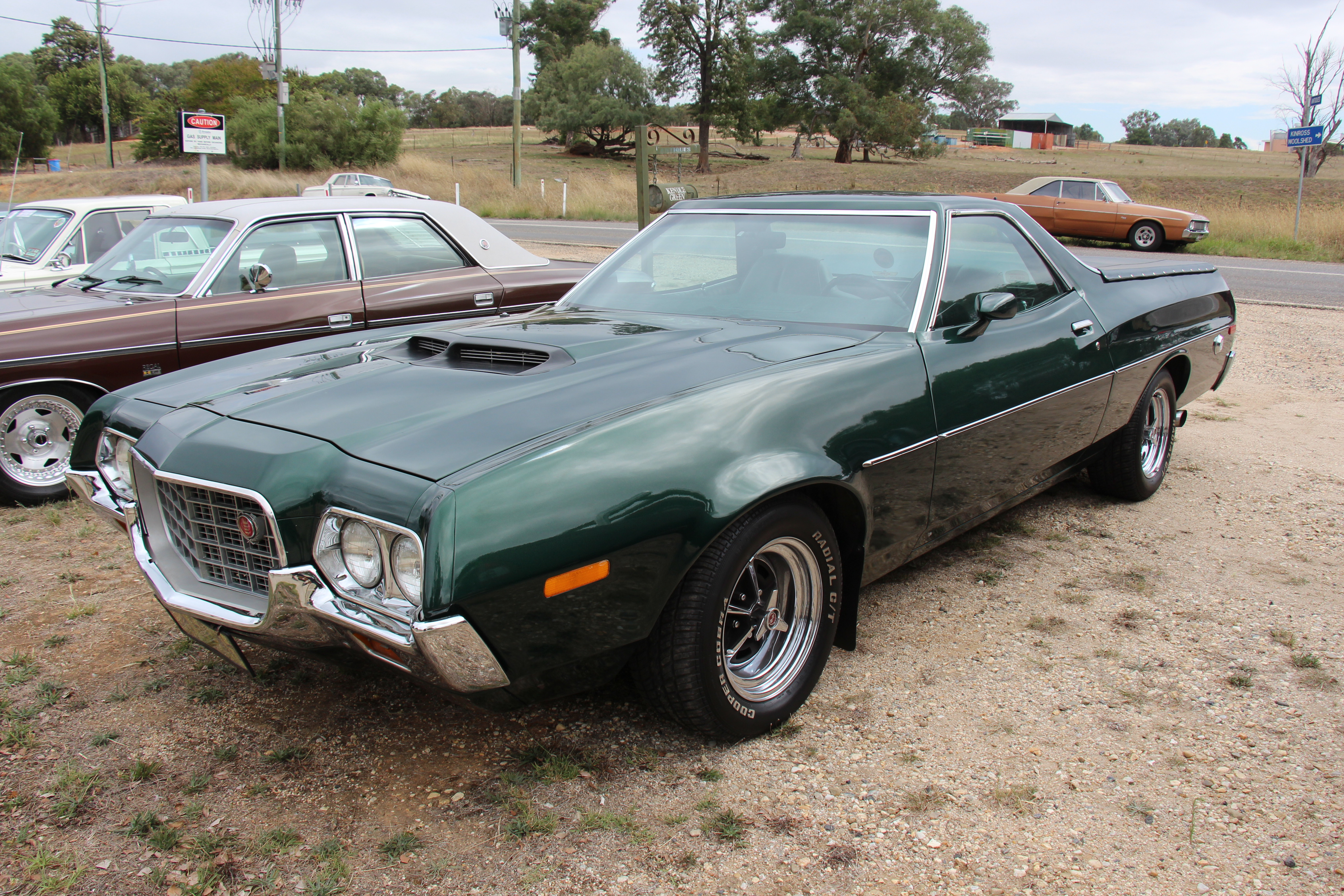
1972 Ford Ranchero 500

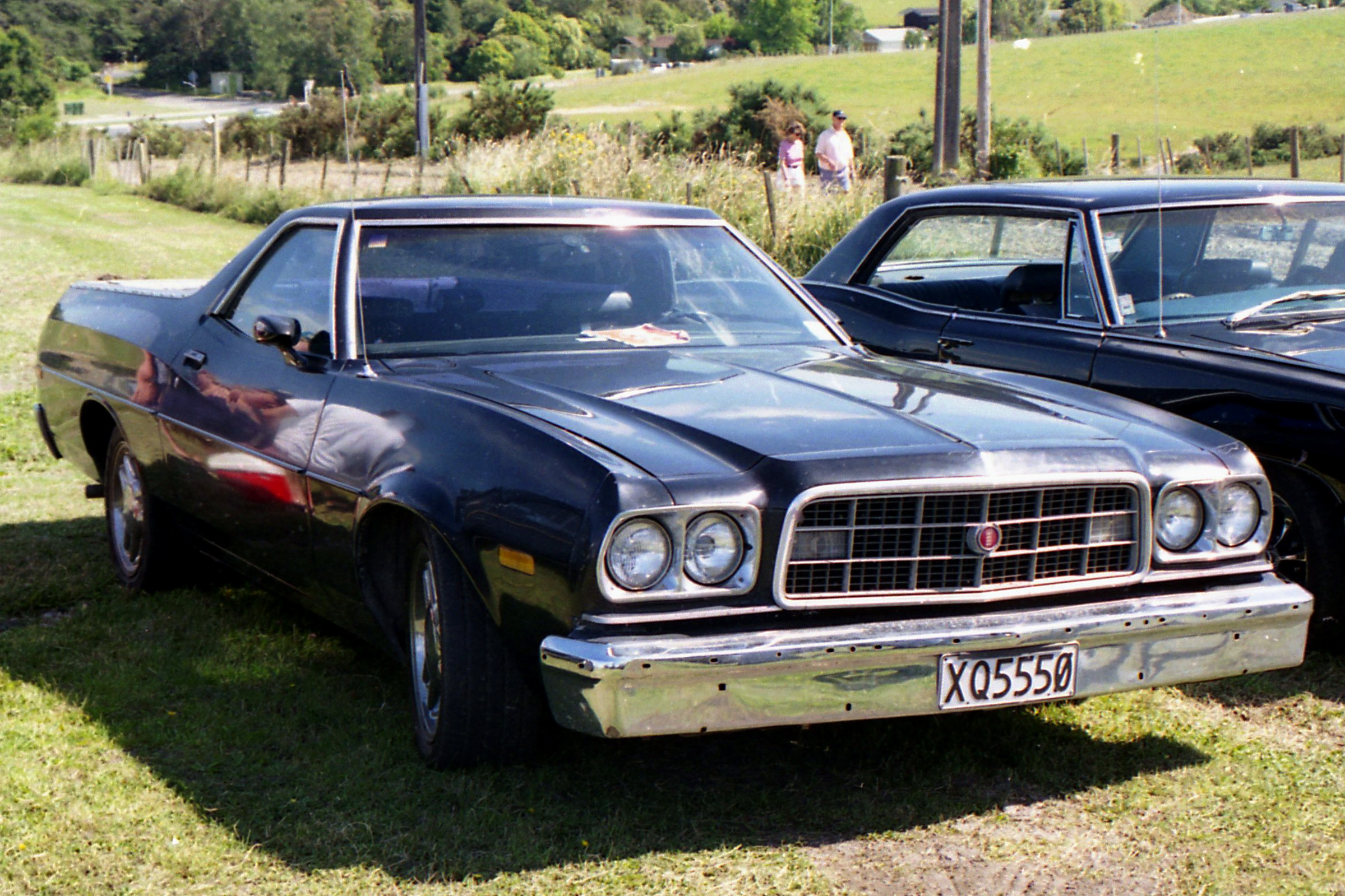
1973 Ford Ranchero (with after-market wheels)

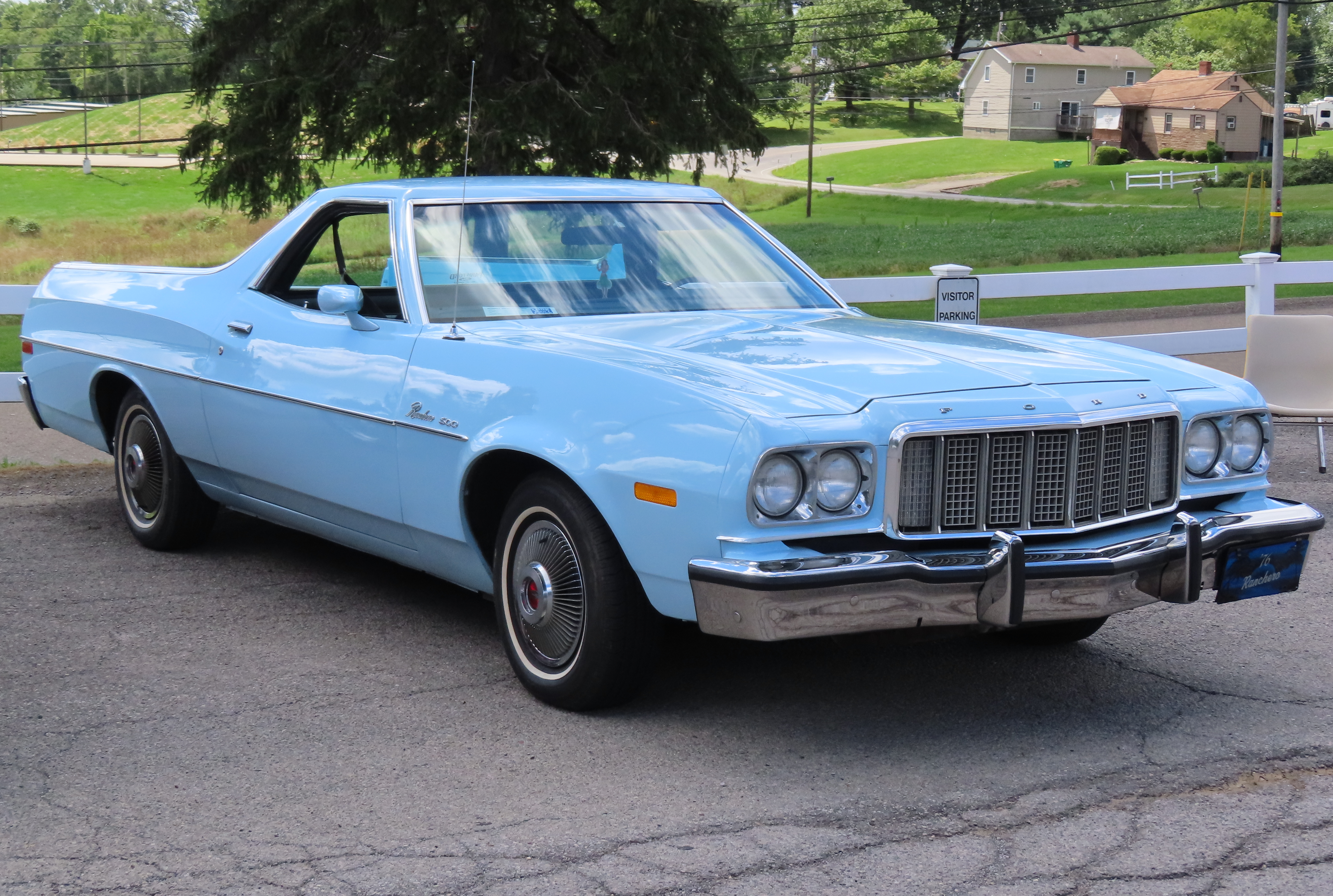
1976 Ford Ranchero 500

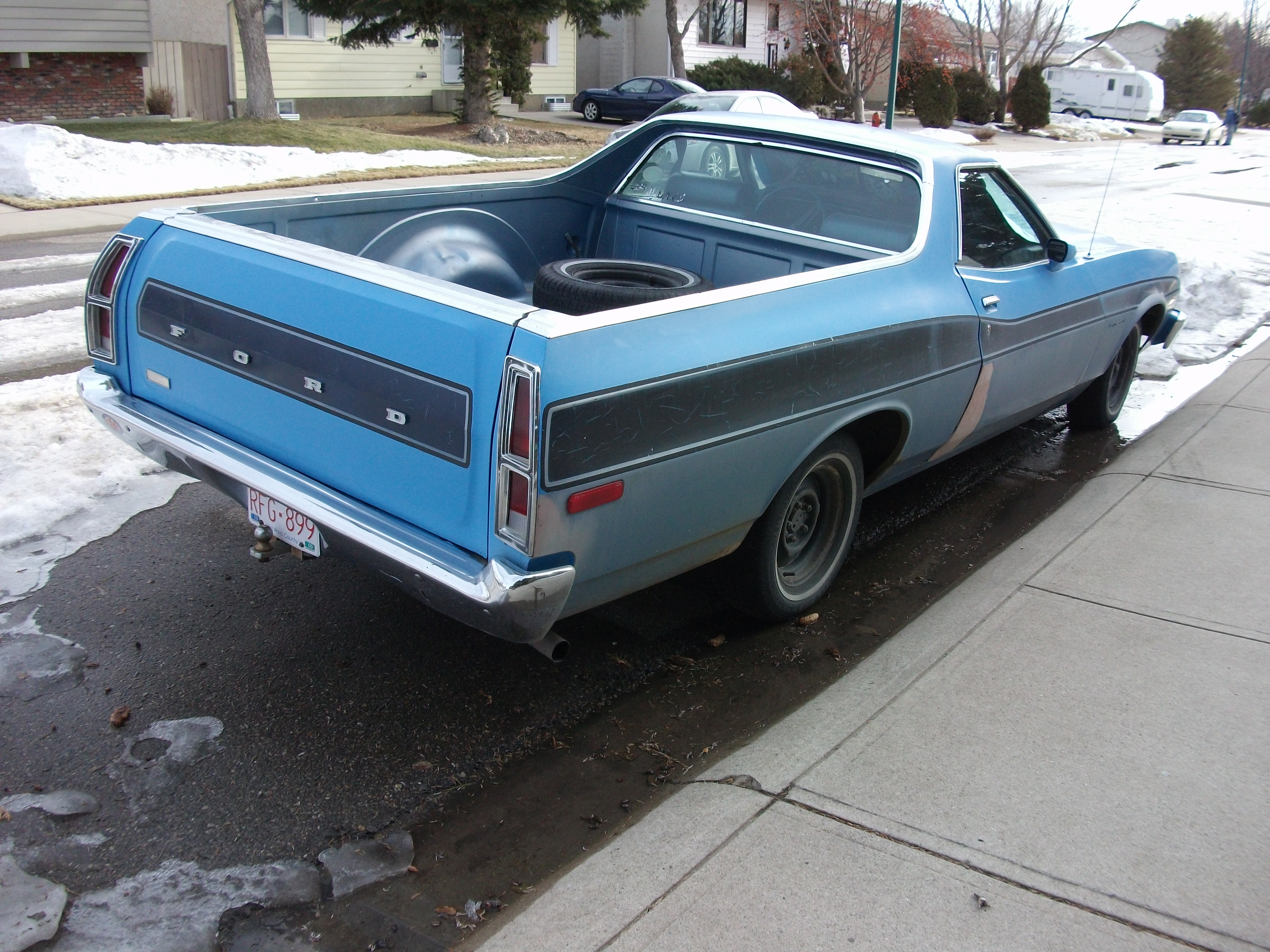
1974–1976 Ford Ranchero rear view

== Seventh generation (1977–1979) ==
Seventh generation
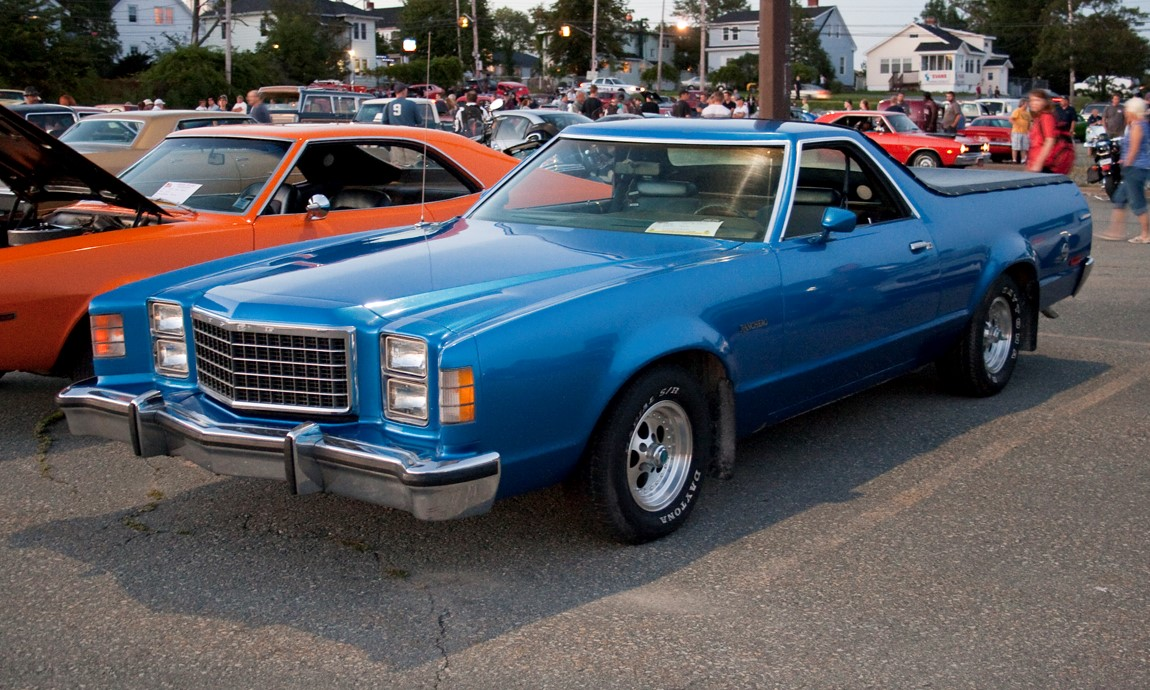

Overview
- Production: 1977–1979
- Assembly: Lorain, Ohio, United States (⧉)

Body and chassis
- Related: Ford LTD II; Ford Thunderbird; Mercury Cougar

Powertrain
- Engine: 302 cu in (4.9 L) V8; 351 cu in (5.8 L) V8; 400 cu in (6.6 L) V8

Dimensions
- Length: 220.1 in (5,591 mm)

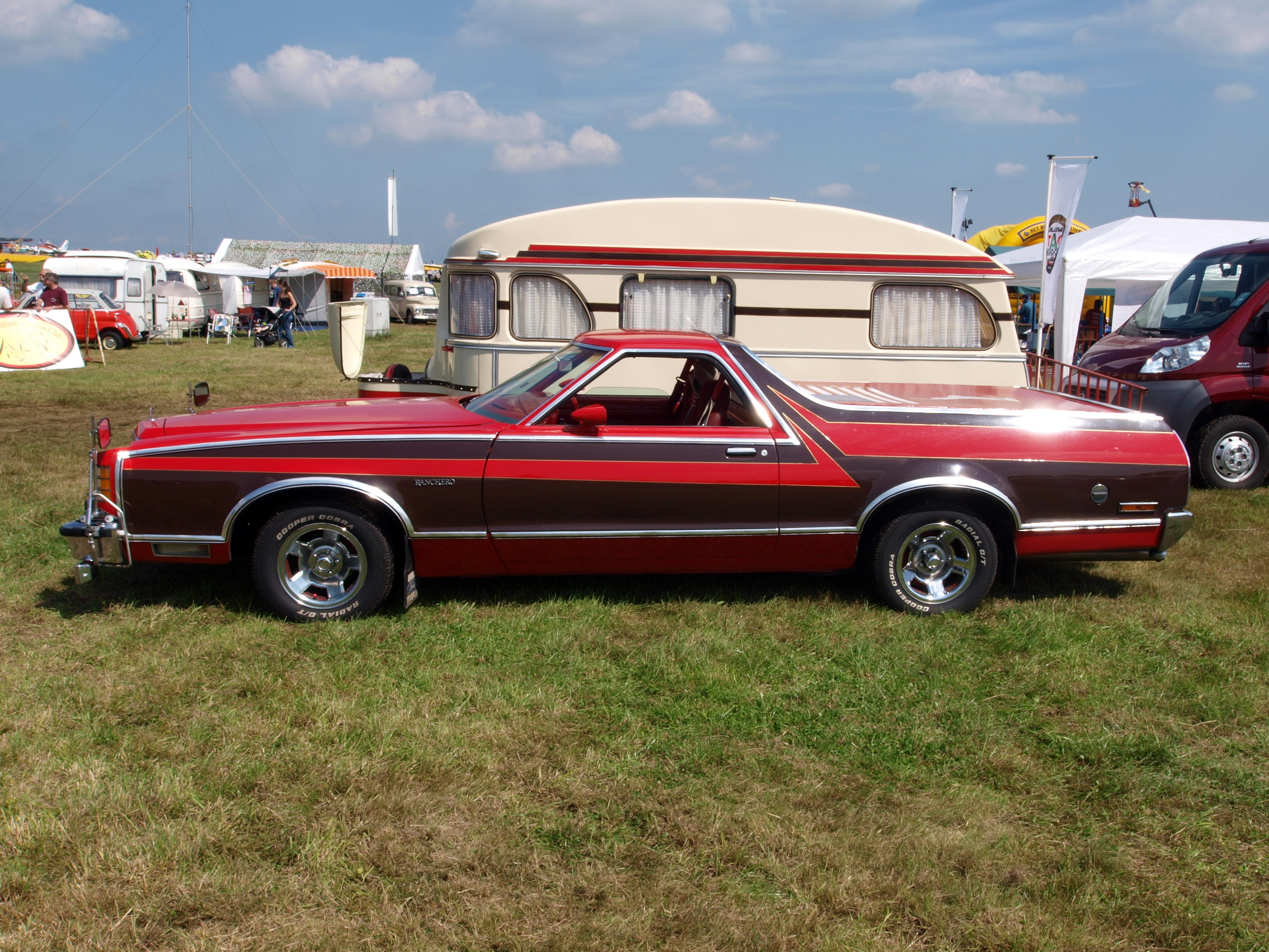
A seventh-generation Ford Ranchero in Belgium

With the Torino ending production after 1976, the 1977 Ranchero was restyled in line with the Ford LTD II mid-sized car line which replaced the Torino using the same platform. The same three models available since 1968 were still offered and the Ranchero could be ordered in quite luxurious form. Engines fitted went up to the 400 cu in (6.6 L). Production ceased in 1979 with, among the traditional choices, a commemorative "1979½" model. Although the LTD II-based Ranchero was not produced for many model years, this body style with stacked rectangular headlamps is one of the most popular among collectors. This generation of Ranchero is often customized by swapping onto it any front end clip from a 1972–1976 Mercury Montego, 1974–1979 Mercury Cougar, 1974–1976 Ford Elite, or 1977–1979 Ford Thunderbird, which all have interchangeable front end parts that easily bolt into place.

Cars were getting smaller and subject to increasing government restrictions, and requirements for a car-based pickup truck made such a vehicle less and less attractive from a manufacturing standpoint. Meanwhile, purpose-designed light trucks had to meet much less stringent requirements for emissions and fuel economy. Ford saw the way the market was going and decided small light trucks were the wave of the future, beginning with the Mazda-built Courier pickup. This vehicle would be a "stepping stone" during which time Ford would develop their homegrown replacement, the Ranger.

== Argentine Ranchero (1973–1991) ==
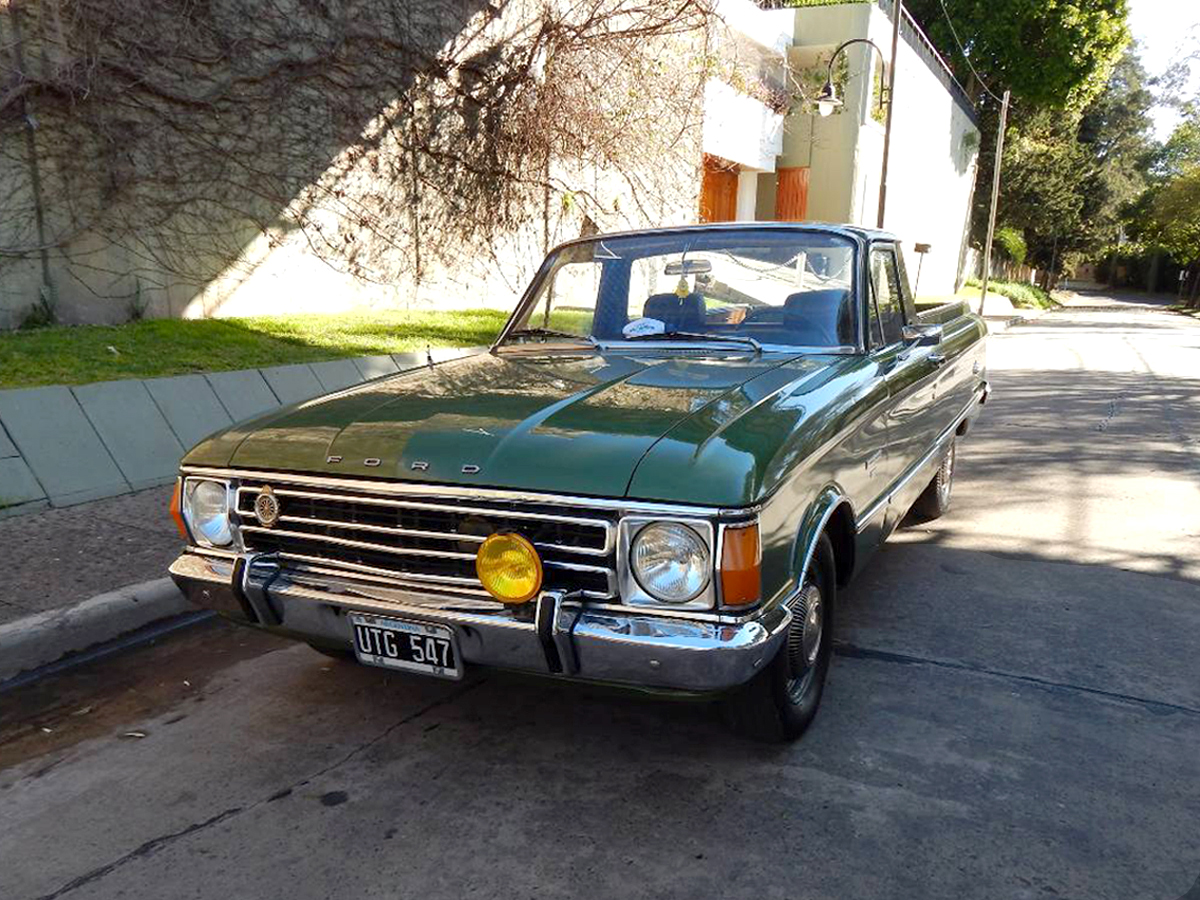
1977 Ford Falcon Ranchero (Argentina)

From 1973 until 1991, Ford Motor Argentina developed and sold a utility version of its own Ford Falcon called the Ford Ranchero. Unlike the American version, it was based on the four-door sedan model, keeping the front part "as is", and knocking down the rear half to make it a light pick-up. The truck was presented in two versions, the light one with a maximum load capacity of 465 kg (1025 lb) and the heavy one with a capacity of 565 kg (1245 lb), both with 14-inch wheels and having the latter front disc brake. The first generation sold very well, and in 1974, exports began to Cuba.

Later that year, it became the best-selling car in Argentina, with a total of 110,382 sold between 1973 and 1978. Production of the second-generation model lasted from 1978 until 1982, and production of the third generation lasted from 1982 until 1987. In 1987, the fourth and final generation was released and in 1988 a diesel model was added to the lineup for the first time, but it was discontinued as of 1989. Production of the fourth-generation Argentine Ranchero ended in 1991.

== Present day ==
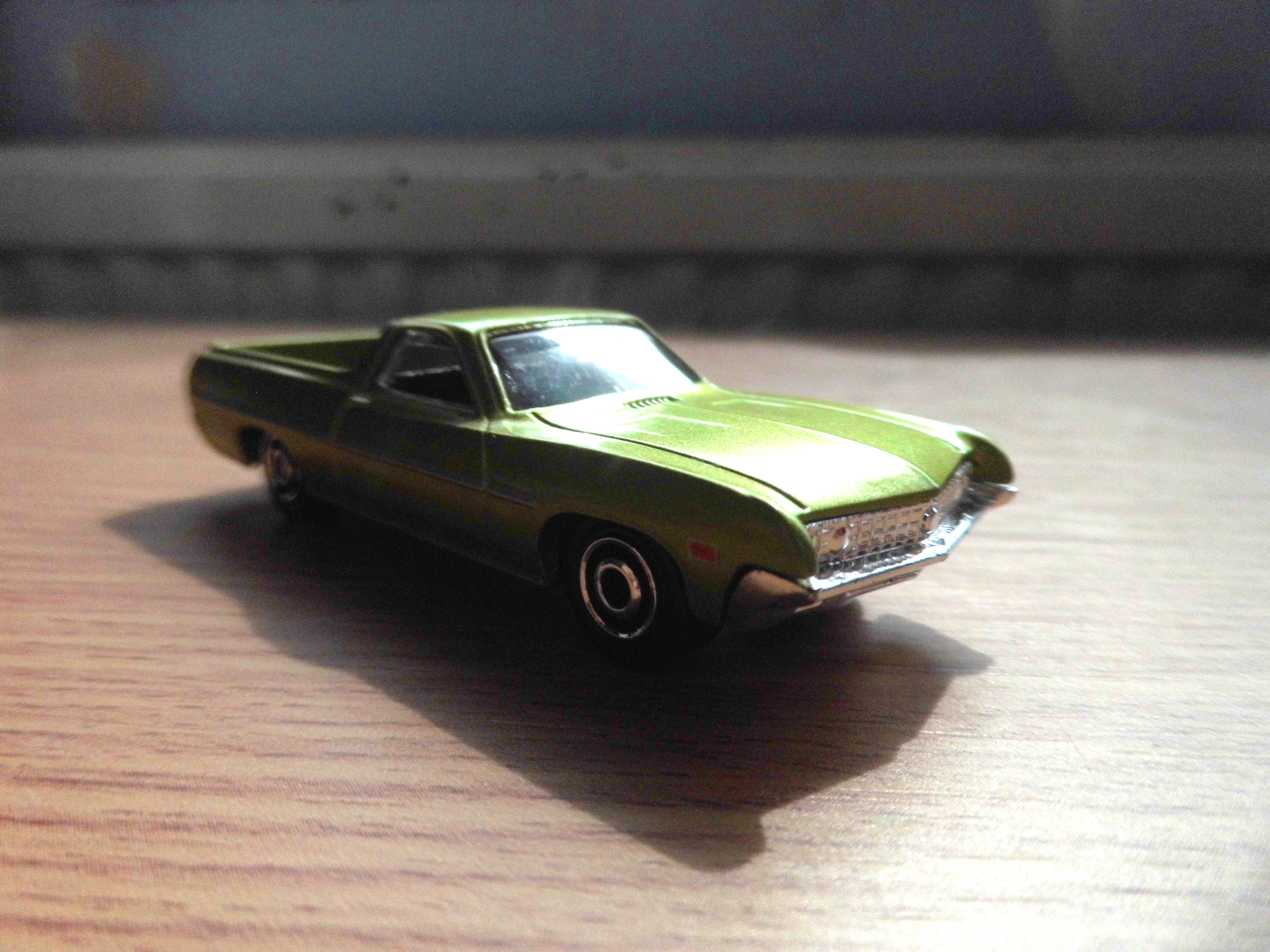
2023 Matchbox model of a 1970 Ford Ranchero

Rancheros are reasonably collectible, though they are nowadays often overlooked in favor of the later-arriving Chevrolet El Camino, which stayed in production eight more years. Miniatures, apart from hand-cast resin kits from cottage-industry makers, are rare. Several Revell offerings of the 1957 model in both 1/32 and 1/25 scale have been offered over the years, as has a kit of the 1961 Ranchero by AMT/Ertl. A well-detailed promotional model of 1959 intended for distribution by dealers was offered both with and without interior trim, windows, and friction drive by AMT/Ertl's predecessor, SMP; resin castings of this model's body are offered by the aforementioned cottage industries, as well. Matchbox produced a 1961 Ford Falcon Ranchero for the 2018 line as well as a 1970 Ford Ranchero for the 2023 line. Johnny Lightning makes a 1964 model, Hot Wheels made an adult collectible '57 in a limited run. In 2009 Hot Wheels produced a '72 Ford Ranchero that is still in production today. Hot Wheels also introduced (in 2011) the '65 Ford Ranchero that has a hard tonneau cover on the bed, and an opening in the hood that reveals the engine beneath. Racing Champions made a 1/64 scale 1957 Ranchero and AMT/Ertl currently produces a diecast '57 which doubles as a bank. AMT was responsible for other early dealer promotional models, too, including those of the aforementioned El Camino. Tonka produced a resin toy version of the 1968-69 model in roughly 1/24 scale as part of an auto transporter set; the front end of that toy arguably resembles the 1969 model more closely. In 2019, Greenlight Collectibles introduced 1972, 1973, 1974, and 1976 Ranchero models in 1/64 scale. The 1979 Ranchero was made as a 1/18 scale resin model by BOS (Best Of Show) Models.

The idea of a car-based pickup remains an attractive one and is an illustration of how favorable treatment for light trucks over cars by United States regulations skews the marketplace. Many Ranchero and El Camino owners, indeed, stopped buying new vehicles when those models were discontinued. Aftermarket conversions of the Fairmont Futura and Mercury Zephyr Z7 sport coupes to a Ranchero-like "Durango" pickup were sold in select Ford dealers in the early- to mid-1980s. Recently, interest in producing such vehicles again has grown, including those like the Subaru Baja, essentially an Outback station wagon with a stubby pickup bed instead of an enclosed cargo area. The Baja, like the Ranchero, is titled in most American states and Canadian provinces as a commercial vehicle. Until the late-2000s, the North American market tended to lean towards compact and midsized crew-cab four-door pickups such as the Ford Explorer Sport Trac and Chevrolet Colorado. However, with the compact pickups having grown towards midsized and encroaching on base models of more profitable full-sized pickups, some manufacturers such as Ford and Ram Trucks have discontinued even their compact and midsized offerings; Ford discontinued the American Ranger in 2012 and originally opted not to sell its global replacement in North America due to being too close in size and price to the base model Ford F-150, though did eventually introduce it for the 2019 model year.

In 2025, Ford filed an application for the trademark to "Ranchero" in the United States, which had previously expired in 2008. Some automotive publications speculated that Ford would use the Ranchero name for a $30,000 two-door electric pickup truck that would be released in 2027. In August 2026, this truck was officially announced as the Ford Fathom.
