= 1948 South American Grand Prix =

South American motor race

1948 South American Grand Prix Gran Premio de la América del Sur del Turismo Carretera
- Round 8 of 9 in the 1948 Turismo Carretera
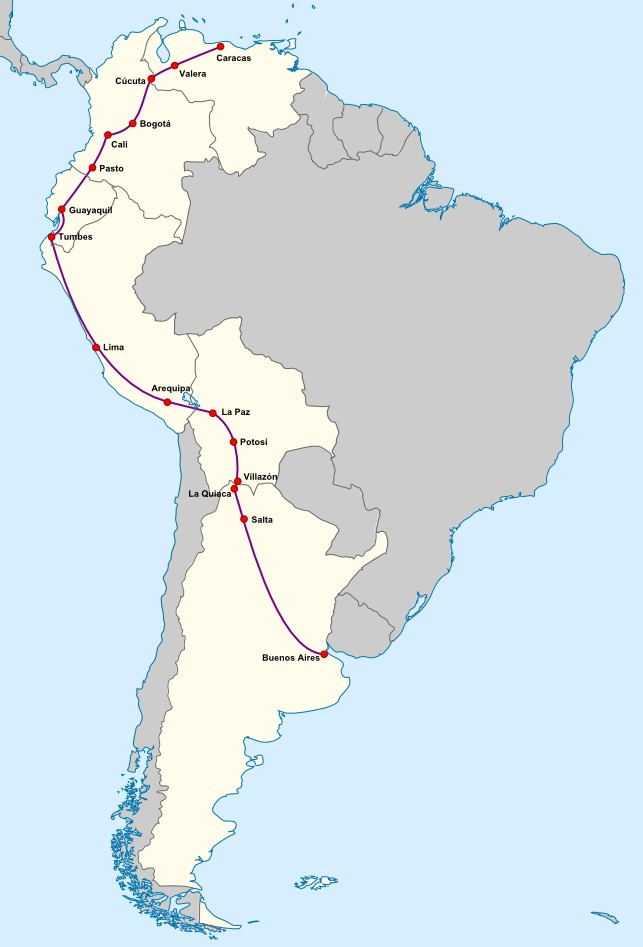
- Race route
- Host country: Argentina; Bolivia; Colombia; Ecuador; Peru; Venezuela
- Dates run: 20 October – 8 November
- Start location: Buenos Aires, Argentina
- Finish location: Caracas, Venezuela
- Stages: 14 (9,576 km; 5,950 miles)
- Stage surface: Asphalt, Dirt/Gravel

Statistics
- Crews registered: 141
- Crews: 138 at start, 44 at finish

Overall results
- Overall winner: (Argentina) Domingo Marimón (Argentina) Pedro Duhalde; Chevrolet Master; 118 hours, 37 minutes, 18 seconds

The 1948 South American Grand Prix (Spanish: Gran Premio de la América del Sur del Turismo Carretera), also known as Buenos Aires–Caracas, was a motor race held as part of the 1948 Turismo Carretera championship.

== Entry list ==
No.	Driver	Co-Driver	Marque
1	(Argentina) Juan Manuel Fangio	(Argentina) Daniel Urrutia	Chevrolet
2	(Uruguay) Héctor Suppici Sedes	(Uruguay) Silvestre Calache	Ford
3	(Argentina) Oscar Alfredo Gálvez	(Argentina) Federico Herrero	Ford
4	(Argentina) Ernesto Hilario Blanco	(Argentina) Atilio Plini	Ford
5	(Argentina) Arturo Kruuse	(Argentina) Juan J. Otero	Plymouth
6	(Argentina) Ricardo Leopoldo Risatti	(Argentina) F. Hugerza	Chevrolet
7	(Argentina) Emilio Karstulović	(Argentina) Raúl Cestac	Ford
8	(Argentina) Pablo Guille	(Argentina) Juan Stroppiana	Chevrolet
9	(Argentina) Juan Gálvez	(Argentina) Desiderio Avila	Ford
10	(Argentina) Daniel Musso	(Argentina) Ricardo Grattier	Ford
11	(Peru) Arnaldo Alvarado Degregori	(Peru) G. Rivadeneira	Ford
12	(Argentina) Domingo Marimón	(Argentina) Pedro Duhalde	Chevrolet
13	(Argentina) Luciano Murro	(Argentina) Enrique Costa	Chevrolet
14	(Argentina) Eusebio Marcilla	(Argentina) Miguel Salem	Chevrolet
15	(Argentina) Tadeo Taddía	(Argentina) Cayetano Cosimano	Chevrolet
16	(Argentina) Fernando Nery	(Argentina) D.J. Renaud	Chevrolet
17	(Argentina) Victor García	(Argentina) Hilario Martínez	Ford
18	(Peru) Henry Bradley	(Peru) Roberto Gómez	Nash
19	(Argentina) Ricardo López	(Argentina) R.J. Fernández	Ford
20	(Argentina) Rosendo Hernández	(Argentina) Juan A. Grillo	Chevrolet
21	(Argentina) Angel Luis Pascuali	(Argentina) E. Callegari	Ford
22	(Argentina) Jorge Rodrigo Daly	(Argentina) Juan Tenaglia	Dodge
23	(Bolivia) Alberto del Caprio	(Bolivia) R. Argandona	Lincoln
24	(Chile) Lorenzo G. Varoli	(Chile) Lorenzo Carlos Varoli	Ford
25	(Peru) Luis Astengo A.	(Peru) J. Salinas Vera	Ford
26	(Argentina) Félix A. Peduzzi	(Argentina) Alberto Gómez	Chevrolet
27	(Argentina) Jordán Senes	(Argentina) Humberto Senes	Ford
28	(Argentina) Miguel Beltrame	(Argentina) V. Rodríguez	Ford
29	(Argentina) Vicente Tirabasso	(Argentina) A. Matías	Ford
30	(Argentina) M. Beltrán Soulé	(Argentina) J. Vilarino	Chevrolet
31	(Argentina) Antonio Gauthier	(Argentina) Juan A. Tenor	Chevrolet
32	(Argentina) Atilio Patrignani	(Argentina) G. Patrigani	Chevrolet
33	(Chile) Eduardo Della Magiora	(Chile) A. Etchegoyen	Ford
34	(Argentina) Luis F. González	(Argentina) A. Panatti	Ford
35	(Argentina) Francisco Neumayer	(Argentina) J.T. Fasci	Ford
36	(Argentina) José Froilán González	(Argentina) Bernardo Pérez	Chevrolet
37	(Argentina) José F. Cafiero	(Argentina) Alberto Luchesi	Ford
38	(Argentina) Carlos Lagorio	(Argentina) M. Bonacorsi	Chevrolet
39	(Argentina) José Muñiz	(Argentina) Gabino García	Ford
40	(Argentina) Aurelio Spinetto	(Argentina) José A. Petrone	Nash
41	(Argentina) Manuel Merino	(Argentina) Remo Gamalero	Ford
42	(Argentina) Adolfo F. Fernández	(Argentina) H. Gutíerrez	Ford
43	(Peru) Román Balta A.	(Peru) Román Balta A.	Chevrolet
44	(Argentina) Benedicto Campos	(Argentina) Andres Papaleo	Ford
45	(Argentina) Mercurio Guiliano	(Argentina) José R. Pereira	Ford
46	(Argentina) Eduardo Orcola	(Argentina) Guido Aggazani	Chevrolet
47	(Bolivia) Raúl Jauregui	(Bolivia) F.A. Quiroga	Mercury
48	(Venezuela) Atilio Cagnasso	(Venezuela) G. Gelardi	Buick
49	(Argentina) Esteban Sokol	(Argentina) E. Cimardi	Chevrolet
50	(Argentina) E. Sabbione Daly	(Argentina) J.C. Mijailides	Lincoln
51	(Argentina) Octavio Moretti	(Argentina) G.E. González	Chevrolet
52	(Argentina) M.C. de Vasconcellos	(Argentina) José Arias	Ford
53	(Chile) Joaquín Salas F.	(Chile) Jorge Sosa V.	Ford
54	(Argentina) Rene Nicolás Faure	(Argentina) Max E. Metzler	Chevrolet
55	(Argentina) Ramón A. Gallo	(Argentina) ?	Chevrolet
56	(Argentina) Julián Q. Elguea	(Argentina) Heriberto Román	Ford
57	(Argentina) Guillermo Martín	(Argentina) Carlos Jacobs	Chevrolet
58	(Bolivia) Hermo Orihuela	(Bolivia) Alberto Orihuela	Ford
59	(Argentina) Eduardo de Lelis	(Argentina) E. Guerrero	Plymouth
60	(Argentina) Américo Giménez	(Argentina) Luis Tollerutti	Ford
61	(Peru) Enrique Forno	(Peru) Víctor Cornejo	Ford
62	(Argentina) Esteban Zamora	(Argentina) Juan del Regno	Chevrolet
63	(Argentina) Oreste C. Casaroli	(Argentina) Florián Ujhelyi	Chevrolet
64	(Argentina) Darío D. Ramonda	(Argentina) E.P. Suárez	Chevrolet
65	(Argentina) Juan Carlos Copello	(Argentina) J. Mario Mungari	Ford
66	(Argentina) A. Zarantonello	(Argentina) E. Martínez	Ford
67	(Argentina) "Ampacama"	(Argentina) A. Spampinato	Chevrolet
68	(Argentina) Juan Carlos Gómez	(Argentina) R.J. Morega	Chevrolet
69	(Argentina) Domingo D'Angelo	(Argentina) Salvador Figlioli	Chevrolet
70	(Argentina) Daimo Bojanich	(Argentina) H.H. Piassalle	Ford
71	(Argentina) Luis Santos	(Argentina) Pascual Bosio	Ford
72	(Peru) Herminio Magaracci	(Peru) José Racchumi	Ford
73	(Argentina) José A. Rapetti	(Argentina) José P. Morelli	Ford
74	(Argentina) Félix Palacios	(Argentina) Ruben Adámoli	Mercury
75	(Argentina) Manuel Cobas	(Argentina) Rafael Melen	Ford
76	(Chile) Alberto Fouiloux	(Chile) A.M. Fernández	Ford
77	(Argentina) José L. Rodríguez	(Argentina) M.C. Ortiz	Ford
78	(Bolivia) Rafael Leizán	(Bolivia) F.J. Leizán	Chevrolet
79	(Argentina) M. Vinardell Molinero	(Argentina) Enrique Bernabé	Ford
80	(Argentina) Carlos R. Alisal	(Argentina) Jacinto Manso	Ford
81	(Argentina) Vicente Alfonsaro	(Argentina) Rodolfo Carro	Chevrolet
82	(Argentina) Salvador V. Turano	(Argentina) Balbino Roldán	Chevrolet
83	(Argentina) Angel R. Castano	(Argentina) Angel Molinari	Ford
84	(Argentina) José Rubiol Roca	(Argentina) ?	Ford
85	(Argentina) José R. Naves	(Argentina) Emilio Tabares	DeSoto
86	(Argentina) Ernesto Baronio	(Argentina) Dionisio Castelo	Ford
87	(Argentina) José Laberguere	(Argentina) Oscar Carrero	Plymouth
88	(Argentina) Pablo Trincavelli	(Argentina) Carlos Grosso	Chevrolet
89	(Argentina) Florentino Castellani	(Argentina) Ernesto Segura	Ford
90	(Peru) Julio Huasasquiche	(Peru) A. Samaniego	Chevrolet
91	(Argentina) Alberto Provera	(Argentina) Pablo Arata	Chevrolet
92	(Argentina) Alberto Mascarell	(Argentina) M. Somerville	Chevrolet
93	(Argentina) "Mumiteite"	(Argentina) "Teitemumi"	Chevrolet
94	(Venezuela) Adolfo Mujica	(Venezuela) Angel Bertello	Ford
95	(Argentina) Carlos Benedetti	(Argentina) E. San Pietro	?
96	(Argentina) Hugo Lanteri	(Argentina) Humberto Jofre	Chevrolet
97	(Argentina) F. Fernández Walker	(Argentina) Luis A. Ferraris	Ford
98	(Argentina) Domingo Sanguinetti	(Argentina) Donato Panza	Chevrolet
99	(Argentina) Almendor Maiharro	(Argentina) José Francia	Chevrolet
100	(Argentina) Juacinto Moss	(Argentina) Domingo Fancio	Ford
101	(Argentina) Domingo Candela	(Argentina) Antonio Magoia	Chevrolet
102	(Argentina) Hugo de Simone	(Argentina) Ernesto Morales	Chevrolet
103	(Argentina) Guido A. Maineri	(Argentina) E. Giovanini	Ford
104	(Argentina) Eugenio Bría	(Argentina) Pedro Collazos	Ford
105	(Argentina) Enrique Quaglia	(Argentina) Rafael Espejo	Chevrolet
106	(Argentina) Alfredo Denita	(Argentina) Alfredo Rozón	Ford
107	(Argentina) Germán Rivera	(Argentina) Enzo O. Ferro	Chevrolet
108	(Argentina) "Paradavalla"	(Argentina) "Mañaz"	Ford
109	(Argentina) Jose Manuel López	(Argentina) A. Talavera	Chevrolet
110	(Bolivia) Juan Rodríguez Vera	(Bolivia) Silvano Ojalvo	Chevrolet
111	(Argentina) José Sciarpelletti	(Argentina) Manuel Arrouge	Chevrolet
112	(Argentina) Eleuterio Schvemier	(Argentina) José A. Sanari	Chevrolet
113	(Argentina) Italo V. Bizio	(Argentina) Luis Repossi	Chevrolet
114	(Argentina) Américo Berta	(Argentina) E. Bioderbost	Chevrolet
115	(Argentina) José Lorenzetti	(Argentina) Juan H. Hermida	Ford
116	(Argentina) Manuel Cubillos	(Argentina) "Tito" Cubillos	Chevrolet
117	(Argentina) Juan Marchini	(Argentina) Hernando Gallo	Ford
118	(Argentina) C. Solveyra Tomkinson	(Argentina) ?	Chevrolet
119	(Argentina) Bartolomé Ortiz Sanz	(Argentina) Julio Castellani	Ford
120	(Argentina) René Roux	(Argentina) Oscar Otermín	Ford
121	(Argentina) Roberto Matassi	(Argentina) Marcos Ciani	Chevrolet
122	(Argentina) Alberto T. Palacios	(Argentina) N. Giachetta	Ford
123	(Argentina) José Balcarce	(Argentina) V.P. Quevedo	Chevrolet
124	(Argentina) Manuel Montes	(Argentina) Raúl Márquez	Chevrolet
125	(Venezuela) Rafael Staccioli	(Venezuela) D. Zappacosta	Ford
126	(Argentina) Pablo Mesples	(Argentina) D.A. Braga	Ford
127	(Argentina) Martín Berasategui	(Argentina) J. Schnarwiller	Buick
128	(Argentina) Alberto Fava	(Argentina) Gaitán Morello	Ford
129	(Argentina) René Nelly Pfister	(Argentina) René Barbani	Chevrolet
130	(Argentina) Francisco Hernández	(Argentina) Juan R. Lucca	Ford
131	(Argentina) Salvador Ataguile	(Argentina) P.M. Gutierrez	Ford
132	(Argentina) Victor O. Roudé	(Argentina) Pedro Mazzoni	Ford
133	(Peru) Manuel Balta A.	(Peru) R. Gutierrez	Chevrolet
134	(Argentina) Francisco Remondino	(Argentina) Luis Zamora	Ford
135	(Argentina) Manuel R. Lastra	(Argentina) Ernesto Cáceres	Chevrolet
136	(Argentina) Eduardo de Lusarreta	(Argentina) José Dema	Chevrolet
137	(Argentina) Ricardo Harriague	(Argentina) M.J. Bergeretti	Ford
138	(Argentina) Adolfo Perazzo	(Argentina) M. García Rey	Chevrolet
139	(Argentina) Ernesto Petrini	(Argentina) Jesús Henry	Ford
140	(Argentina) Luis Echevarría	(Argentina) Carlos Rancales	Chevrolet
141	(Argentina) Guillermo Marenghini	(Argentina) E. Semperena	Chevrolet

== Report ==
=== Stage 1 ===
Two entrants withdrew prior to the race starting – Ernesto Hilario Blanco with illness, and Esteban Sokol having crashed his car before the departure.

The first stage was also the longest; just over 1,000 mi from Buenos Aires to Salta. José Froilán González took the start in a Chevrolet, but withdrew not long after as he allegedly didn't realise the race was going all the way to Caracas and didn't believe such a journey could be done – calling his rivals "crazy". Oscar Alfredo Gálvez and Juan Manuel Fangio led the way, but Fangio's charge was halted with differential problems and the Balcarceño lost four hours repairing it. Gálvez thereafter remained unchallenged to the stage finish, with Fangio's Chevrolet stablemate Domingo Marimón finishing second and Gálvez' brother Juan third.

As soon as the race had started however, problems were already emerging. Large crowds thronged the roads outside of Buenos Aires, resulting in two spectator fatalities – one when Octavio Moretti lost control of his Chevrolet and ran over a group of bystanders, and another when an allegedly drunken man crossed the road in front of Daniel Musso's Ford. A distressed Musso abandoned the race at the end of the stage.

=== Stage 2 ===
Stage 2 took the crews from Salta to the Argentine border town of La Quiaca. Oscar Gálvez claimed his second successive stage victory on the gravel country roads, but Uruguayan star Héctor Suppici Sedes crashed in Maimará and immediately withdrew – returning home to Montevideo.

=== Stage 3 ===
94 crews crossed the La Quiaca River into Bolivia to recommence the race from Villazón. The 460 km route to Potosí was treacherous at over 3,000m above sea level, and ultimately claimed the lives of Ford team Julián Elguea and Heriberto Román – they failed to negotiate a hairpin outside the town of Culpina and fell 200m into a ravine. Elguea's brother-in-law Domingo Fancio was competing as co-driver to Juancito Moss and the crew immediately withdrew from the race. Oscar Gálvez extended his lead with a third-straight stage win, ahead of Pablo Gulle in second and Marimón third.

=== Stage 4 ===
Juan Gálvez claimed his first stage win on the road from Potosí to the Bolivian capital La Paz as his brother Oscar struck trouble. The #3 Ford hit a rock and required repairs to the steering rack, but he retained the overall lead heading into a rest day.

=== Stage 5 ===
Fangio had recovered to 40th after his first stage woes, and went on the attack on the fifth stage over the Peruvian border into Arequipa. The Gálvez brothers consolidated the pace across the Altiplano, but Fangio passed 30 cars over the Andes to claim his first stage win and the first for Chevrolet.

=== Stage 6 ===
The second-longest stage of the race saw competitors descend to the Pacific coast into the Peruvian capital Lima. Fangio – now inside the top-30 overall – continued to press on until a rollover near Nazca forced him to back off, finishing the stage 23rd and still sitting over 6 hours behind leader Oscar Gálvez, who claimed his fourth stage win. The 25,000-strong crowd that gathered in the capital to see the spectacle were rewarded for their support when local driver Arnaldo Alvarado Degregori came home third.

=== Stage 7 ===
Thursday October 28 was scheduled as a rest day, however the start of Stage 7 was brought forward from 5am on Friday to 10pm that night due to a coup d'état in Peru that resulted in the installation of Manuel Odría as President. Sleep-deprived crews were ill-prepared for the change of plans, with misty coastal roads adding to the challenge of the last 1,000 km+ stage.

Still recovering lost ground, Fangio was pushing hard – so much so that he and co-driver Daniel Urrutia missed a refuelling point and had to backtrack. Just outside of Huanchaco, on the northern outskirts of Trujillo, Fangio lost control on a left-hand bend and rolled down an embankment at 140kph. Co-driver Urrutia was ejected from the car through the windscreen in the incident, and landed heavily in scrubland. Oscar Gálvez, who had been battling Fangio earlier in the stage, witnessed the accident and stopped to help – much to the objection of Fangio, who wanted the race leader to continue. Having found a badly injured Urrutia, Eusebio Marcilla and Luciano Murro then stopped to help transport Fangio and Urrutia respectively to a hospital in Chocope. Urrutia became the events' fifth fatality having suffered cervical and basal skull fractures, whilst Fangio also suffered neck injuries but these were not life-threatening.

Despite many wanting to withdraw from the race after the incident, Fangio urged his rivals to continue. Juan Gálvez eventually led 53 crews to the end of Stage 7 and the halfway point of the event in the Peruvian border town of Tumbes. Fangio's crash was not the only terminal one in the stage, with four other crews – including the hero of Lima, Arnaldo Alvarado Degregori – forced to retire.

=== Stage 8 ===
A ship then carried the competitors to the Ecuadorian port of Guayaquil, where the race resumed en route to Quito. Juan Gálvez made it back-to-back stage wins to reduce his brother's lead to 1h11m. Pablo Gulle retired from 8th overall with a mechanical failure.

=== Stage 9 ===
Upon arrival in Quito, the field faced significant economic problems. In order to ensure the race continued, Argentine President Juan Perón personally decreed a donation of AR$100,000 to competitors. Oscar Gálvez led brother Juan over the border into the Colombian town of Pasto to finish 1–2 for Ford. There were further spectator problems in the final kilometres – Víctor García crashed into a crowd killing one and injuring four others, whilst a wooden platform overlooking the finish collapsed and seriously injured multiple.

=== Stage 10 ===
The tenth stage to Cali proved the race's slowest, with stage winner Juan Gálvez traversing the mountainous route at an average of just under 62kph.

=== Stage 11 ===
The Gálvez brothers continued their dominance of the race into the Colombian capital Bogotá, race leader Oscar this time leading Juan through the low-altitude Andes passes.

=== Stage 12 ===
Following a rest day in Bogotá, crews travelled through the mountains to Cúcuta on the border with Venezuela – Juan Gálvez claiming his fifth stage win.

=== Stage 13 ===
The penultimate stage crossed the border into Venezuela and onto the town of Valera. Oscar Gálvez claimed his seventh stage win as brother Juan went off the road and into an embankment, but recovered to finish the stage having lost two hours to be 2h25m behind his brother in the overall classification. Salvador Ataguille finished the stage in a surprise second and consolidated his place inside the top 10, but still sat a long way behind third-placed Domingo Marimón – Marimón remained some 5h off the lead.

=== Stage 14 ===
The final stage into the Venezuelan capital Caracas proved dramatic. Juan Gálvez, undaunted by the seemingly insurmountable margin to his brother, pushed his way to the lead of the stage. At the halfway mark entering San Rafael de Onoto, Gálvez misjudged his speed over a series of speed humps – crashing into a ditch and breaking his differential. Organisers had put up signs to warn the drivers of the speed humps the day before the race, but spectators had removed them. Marimón was next on the scene and blocked the road in order to force his competitors to help. Víctor García, who had nearly withdrawn after his crash into Pasto about a week earlier, avoided the incident zone and drove on to win the stage – and became only the fourth entry to win a stage.

"There are regulations, and the commissioners say that they were not complied with."

— Juan Perón on Oscar Gálvez' disqualification.

Oscar had helped to retrieve his brother, but put excessive wear on his engine in the process and later broke his crankshaft in the village of Los Guayos just 60 km from the finish. He was pushed to the finish line by a spectator in a Buick, resulting in the disqualification of the race-long leader as he failed to cross the finish line under his own power. Gálvez appealed to none other than Juan Perón to have the decision overturned, but Perón insisted in a telegram that the organisers upheld the regulations. As a result, Domingo Marimón and co-driver Pedro Duhalde – despite having not won a single stage – were crowned the winners, finishing with a time of 118 hours, 37 minutes and 18 seconds. Marimón's team-mate Eusebio Marcilla was classified second just 12 minutes behind, followed by Juan Gálvez in third – who lost 3 hours in his final-day drama to finish half an hour behind Marimón.

== Results ==
=== Stage winners ===
Stage	Start	Finish	Date	Winning crew	Winning car	Stage time	Distance
1	(Argentina) Buenos Aires	(Argentina) Salta	October 20–21	(Argentina) Oscar Alfredo Gálvez (Argentina) Federico Herrero	Ford	13h52m47s	1,692 km
2	(Argentina) Salta	(Argentina) La Quiaca	October 22	(Argentina) Oscar Alfredo Gálvez (Argentina) Federico Herrero	Ford	4h47m21s	380.1 km
3	(Bolivia) Villazón	(Bolivia) Potosí	October 23	(Argentina) Oscar Alfredo Gálvez (Argentina) Federico Herrero	Ford	7h12m15s	459.8 km
4	(Bolivia) Potosí	(Bolivia) La Paz	October 24	(Argentina) Juan Gálvez (Argentina) Desiderio Avila	Ford	6h44m10s	543.4 km
5	(Bolivia) La Paz	(Peru) Arequipa	October 26	(Argentina) Juan Manuel Fangio (Argentina) Daniel Urrutia	Chevrolet	7h01m09s	546.2 km
6	(Peru) Arequipa	(Peru) Lima	October 27	(Argentina) Oscar Alfredo Gálvez (Argentina) Federico Herrero	Ford	9h43m36s	1,092 km
7	(Peru) Lima	(Peru) Tumbes	October 28–29	(Argentina) Juan Gálvez (Argentina) Desiderio Avila	Ford	11h49m42s	1,322 km
8	(Ecuador) Guayaquil	(Ecuador) Quito	November 1	(Argentina) Juan Gálvez (Argentina) Desiderio Avila	Ford	5h56m14s	421 km
9	(Ecuador) Quito	(Colombia) Pasto	November 2	(Argentina) Oscar Alfredo Gálvez (Argentina) Federico Herrero	Ford	5h56m59s	392 km
10	(Colombia) Pasto	(Colombia) Cali	November 3	(Argentina) Juan Gálvez (Argentina) Desiderio Avila	Ford	7h06m20s	440 km
11	(Colombia) Cali	(Colombia) Bogotá	November 4	(Argentina) Oscar Alfredo Gálvez (Argentina) Federico Herrero	Ford	7h26m23s	527 km
12	(Colombia) Bogotá	(Colombia) Cúcuta	November 6	(Argentina) Juan Gálvez (Argentina) Desiderio Avila	Ford	8h46m53s	599 km
13	(Colombia) Cúcuta	(Venezuela) Valera	November 7	(Argentina) Oscar Alfredo Gálvez (Argentina) Federico Herrero	Ford	8h24m00s	484 km
14	(Venezuela) Valera	(Venezuela) Caracas	November 8	(Argentina) Víctor García (Argentina) Hilario Martínez	Ford	7h46m56s	677 km

=== Outright ===
Final standings (positions 1–10)
Pos	Driver	Co-Driver	Car	Overall time	Difference
1	(Argentina) Domingo Marimón	(Argentina) Pedro Duhalde	Chevrolet	118h37m18s	
2	(Argentina) Eusebio Marcilla	(Argentina) Miguel Salem	Chevrolet	118h49m59s	+12m41s
3	(Argentina) Juan Gálvez	(Argentina) Desiderio Avila	Ford	119h07m59s	+30m41s
4	(Argentina) Salvador Ataguille	(Argentina) P.M. Gutierrez	Ford	122h21m45s	+3h44m27s
5	(Argentina) Daimo Bojanich	(Argentina) H.H. Piassalle	Ford	122h30m58s	+3h53m40s
6	(Argentina) Manuel Merino	(Argentina) Remo Gamalero	Ford	123h58m47s	+5h21m29s
7	(Argentina) Víctor García	(Argentina) Hilario Martínez	Ford	124h02m00s	+5h24m42s
8	(Argentina) Ricardo López	(Argentina) R.J. Fernández	Ford	124h14m58s	+5h37m40s
9	(Argentina) Guido Maineri	(Argentina) E. Giovanini	Ford	125h00m32s	+6h23m14s
10	(Argentina) Tadeo Taddía	(Argentina) Cayetano Cosimano	Chevrolet	126h01m03s	+7h23m45s

Final standings (positions 11–44)
Pos.	Driver	Co-Driver	Car	Time	Difference
11	(Argentina) Juan Marchini	(Argentina) Hernando Gallo	Ford	126h56m11s	+8h18m53s
12	(Argentina) M. Vinardell Molinero	(Argentina) Enrique Bernabé	Ford	127h32m06s	+8h54m48s
13	(Argentina) Eduardo Orcola	(Argentina) Guido Aggazani	Chevrolet	127h59m20s	+9h22m02s
14	(Argentina) Darío D. Ramonda	(Argentina) E.P. Suárez	Chevrolet	129h20m53s	+10h43m35s
15	(Argentina) Mercurio Guiliano	(Argentina) José R. Pereira	Ford	129h24m14s	+10h46m56s
16	(Argentina) Ernesto Baronio	(Argentina) Dionisio Castelo	Ford	133h29m49s	+14h52m31s
17	(Argentina) José Lorenzetti	(Argentina) Juan H. Hermida	Ford	133h45m12s	+15h07m54s
18	(Argentina) Fernando Nery	(Argentina) D.J. Renaud	Chevrolet	134h04m59s	+15h27m41s
19	(Argentina) Américo Berta	(Argentina) E. Bioderbost	Chevrolet	135h05m42s	+16h28m24s
20	(Argentina) Jose Manuel López	(Argentina) A. Talavera	Chevrolet	135h26m35s	+16h49m17s
21	(Argentina) Angel Luis Pascuali	(Argentina) E. Callegari	Ford	135h35m54s	+16h58m36s
22	(Argentina) Carlos Lagorio	(Argentina) M. Bonacorsi	Chevrolet	137h23m01s	+18h45m43s
23	(Argentina) Miguel Beltrame	(Argentina) V. Rodríguez	Ford	138h35m24s	+19h58m06s
24	(Argentina) Oreste C. Casaroli	(Argentina) Florián Ujhelyi	Chevrolet	138h51m24s	+20h14m06s
25	(Argentina) Luis F. González	(Argentina) A. Panatti	Ford	139h01m42s	+20h24m24s
26	(Argentina) Alberto Provera	(Argentina) Pablo Arata	Chevrolet	142h03m18s	+23h26m00s
27	(Argentina) Guillermo Marenghini	(Argentina) E. Semperena	Chevrolet	142h07m59s	+23h30m41s
28	(Argentina) Bartolomé Ortiz Sanz	(Argentina) Julio Castellani	Ford	142h31m11s	+23h53m53s
29	(Chile) Eduardo Della Magiora	(Chile) A. Etchegoyen	Ford	148h31m36s	+1d05h54m18s
30	(Argentina) Vicente Tirabasso	(Argentina) A. Matías	Ford	149h19m11s	+1d06h41m53s
31	(Argentina) René Nelly Pfister	(Argentina) René Barbani	Chevrolet	151h05m32s	+1d08h28m14s
32	(Argentina) Guillermo Martín	(Argentina) Carlos Jacobs	Chevrolet	152h05m19s	+1d09h28m01s
33	(Chile) Alberto Fouiloux	(Chile) A.M. Fernández	Ford	152h42m19s	+1d10h05m01s
34	(Peru) Román Balta A.	(Peru) Román Balta A.	Chevrolet	154h04m51s	+1d11h27m33s
35	(Bolivia) Rafael Leizán	(Bolivia) F.J. Leizán	Chevrolet	155h05m07s	+1d12h27m49s
36	(Peru) Herminio Magaracci	(Peru) José Racchumi	Ford	155h36m01s	+1d12h58m43s
37	(Argentina) Luis Santos	(Argentina) Pascual Bosio	Ford	155h50m06s	+1d13h12m48s
38	(Venezuela) Rafael Staccioli	(Venezuela) D. Zappacosta	Ford	157h42m08s	+1d15h04m50s
39	(Bolivia) Hermo Orihuela	(Bolivia) Alberto Orihuela	Ford	158h07m59s	+1d15h30m41s
40	(Argentina) Jordán Senes	(Argentina) Humberto Senes	Ford	161h38m22s	+1d19h01m04s
41	(Argentina) Domingo Sanguinetti	(Argentina) Donato Panza	Chevrolet	165h54m00s	+1d23h16m42s
42	(Argentina) Eugenio Bría	(Argentina) Pedro Collazos	Ford	166h04m26s	+1d23h27m08s
43	(Argentina) José L. Rodríguez	(Argentina) M.C. Ortiz	Ford	172h23m20s	+2d05h46m02s
44	(Argentina) Américo Giménez	(Argentina) Luis Tollerutti	Ford	175h40m20s	+2d09h03m02s
