= Ford Fairlane (touring) =

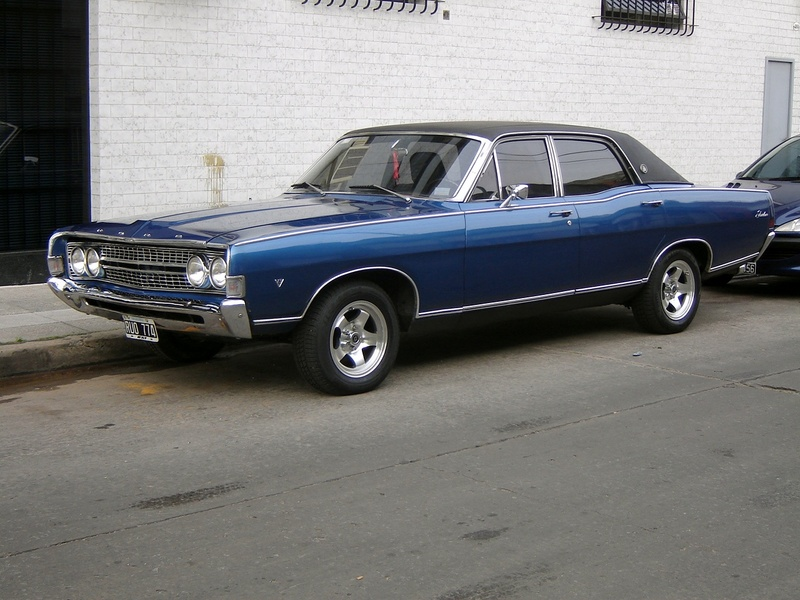

Overview
- Manufacturer: Ford Motor Company
- Production: 1969–1982
- Assembly: La Boca and General Pacheco, Buenos Aires, Argentina

Body and chassis
- Class: Touring car
- Body style: Four-door sedan
- Layout: Front-engine, rear-wheel drive
- Related: Ford Torino

The Ford Fairlane was a car manufactured in Argentina by the Ford Motor Company of that country. It was a large, luxurious car with a semi-sporty design. The car was a derivative of the American model Ford Torino, which could not be used as its name because a few years before its introduction, another car with a similar name was presented: the IKA-Renault Torino. To avoid legal issues (since IKA had registered the name "Torino", making it unavailable for Ford in Argentina), the name Fairlane was chosen, a name commonly used by Ford for its cars in United States.

The Fairlane was a luxury car introduced by Ford in 1968. At that time, the brand aimed to capture a market seeking exclusivity: the luxury vehicle segment. As was characteristic of Ford in other countries, such as Brazil with the Ford Galaxie, in Argentina the same effect was sought, presenting the Fairlane as a complement to a segment already dominated by the Ford Falcon. However, the Falcon's high popularity and its constant use in competitions made it a common car, losing exclusivity, a feature the Fairlane aimed to restore.

It was a car widely used by National Government authorities, as well as by large companies for their fleets due to its extensive comfort, large dimensions, and elegant design. Beyond this, the Fairlane also made its mark in national motorsport, specifically in Turismo Carretera, where it was often a tough competitor due to its aerodynamic lines. However, its appearance coincided with a time when Ford began to dominate the specialty, leading the category authorities to prohibit the use of the Ford Fairlane. This marked the end of the car's sporting history. Production of this luxury car ceased in 1982.

== History ==
In 1968, Ford Motor de Argentina decided to expand its product range for its consumers. Characterized as a luxury car brand in Argentina, it had lost that exclusivity when its flagship product, the Ford Falcon, became widely used in various aspects of society. Therefore, Ford decided to double down and attempt to offer a distinctly exclusive car. To achieve this, they began searching for a model that could be adapted to the tastes of Argentine consumers. The chosen model for production was the four-door sedan version of the Sixth Generation (1968-1969) of the American Ford Fairlane, which also had two-door sedan and fastback versions, and a two-door convertible, but none were produced in Argentina. The North American version had two body styles, one for 1968 and another for 1969. The four-door sedan, 1968 body style, was built in Argentina from 1969 to 1973, and the 1969 body style was manufactured between 1973 and 1981. These two versions had few differences, with the most notable being the format of the rear lights, which were vertical between 1969 and 1973 and square between 1973 and 1981. The Sixth Generation was manufactured in three plants in United States (New Jersey, Ohio, and California) and one in Argentina (General Pacheco).

The new Ford Fairlane was introduced in 1968 in the country, but its mass production began a year later in 1969. For its presentation, a pre-launch advertising campaign was mounted, showing a caravan of Fairlanes moving in the darkness with their lights on while the announcer said, "For you, the New spatial serenity is arriving". The term "spatial" referred to the vehicle's habitability. When the Fairlane was finally presented, its commercial featured an Arab sheik arriving in Argentina, and a Ford Fairlane was waiting to take him to his hotel. After testing the car's attributes, the sheik wanted three units to also transport his wives. The advertisement ended with the slogan adopted at the time for the Fairlane: New spatial serenity.

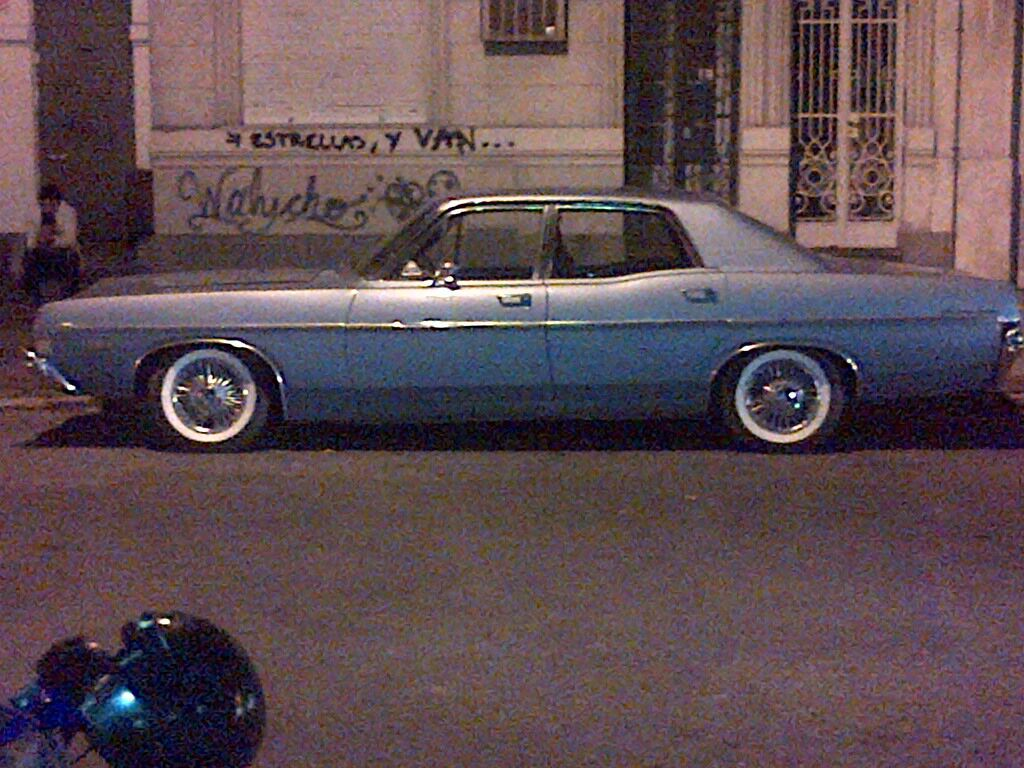
Ford Fairlane parked on the streets of Rosario

The Fairlane was introduced in three models: Standard, Fairlane 500, and Fairlane LTD. The model impressed with its enormous dimensions, measuring 5.1 meters long and 1.9 meters wide, giving an idea of its size. The car's design was based on a sober and stately style, featuring details that expressed its elegance in the highest form. The lateral design of the body extended beyond the grille line, which housed dual circular headlights. In terms of mechanics, its engines included a 6-cylinder 221 cubic inches and 132 hp for the standard version, and a V8 292 cubic inches and 185 hp in the 500 and LTD versions, all paired with a 3-speed manual transmission located on the steering column. One of the most acclaimed attributes of the Fairlane was its ride comfort, provided by its suspensions: a deformable parallelogram with springs and shock absorbers at the front and leaf springs at the rear. Returning to its design details, the interior upholstery varied between cloth or vinyl, with anatomical seat structures. Optional features included vinyl roofs in various colors, imitation wire hubcaps, and whitewall tires. Specifically, these hubcaps equipped the LTD version, while the 500 version used metalized hubcaps.

Due to its elegant design, some were used by taxi drivers. It was also used for the reception and transportation of important personalities and, of course, as a hearse. By 1970, the De Luxe and LTD Elite versions were introduced, featuring the latest equipment. Some of these details included the addition of air conditioning, power steering, and an optional electric radio antenna. This last antenna was activated by a remote control inside the car but was placed above the right side of the front and designed in such a way that a part of it remained outside, giving the car an elegant touch. This idea was eventually abandoned as many found themselves dealing with someone who had fun bending and breaking it.

Regarding its engine, it was considered a rarity, as in Argentina there were only cars with 4 or 6-cylinder inline engines. Even cars of its size and category, such as the Dodge Coronado, were equipped with 6-cylinder engines. The response came a few years later with the appearance of the Dodge GTX, which had the most powerful V8 engine in the country. The Fairlane's engine was nicknamed V8 Phase II because it was the same Phase I engine that Ford used for its early trucks and was modified for the Fairlane. Another engine that equipped the Ford Fairlane was the well-known 6-cylinder 221 cubic inches engine, which was already used in the Ford Falcon and Ford F-100 trucks.

Finally, in 1982, with the rise of imported low-consumption European cars, the Fairlane ceased production in General Pacheco, with 29,602 units produced. Like its smaller sibling, the Ford Falcon, today the Fairlane is considered a cult object by brand enthusiasts, who view this car as the best due to its V8 engine. Several clubs have formed around this car, and its achievements in national motorsport are remembered.

== The Fairlane in National Automotive Culture ==
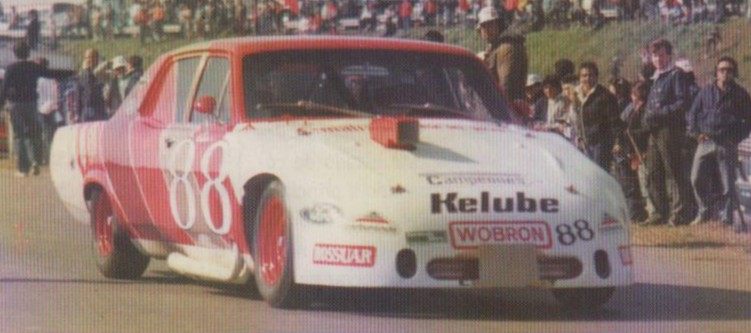
Norberto Bressano and his Ford Fairlane.

The Fairlane was always considered by society as a car for the upper class due to its enormous size, high performance, always luxurious equipment, and considerable high cost. Due to these attributes, it was usually used by politicians and businessmen as an essential part of their daily lives. The Fairlane was also widely used as an official car for presidential and ministerial acts, being a privilege that many wanted to obtain. Those who had it understood the importance of showing off their vehicle as an emblem of their social status. The 1981 model featured an exclusive gold key for its owners.

As a reference for national motorsport, it was a car widely used in Turismo Carretera, in which it achieved notable victories, including several wins of the 24 Hours of Buenos Aires. It was the car in which legendary drivers of Argentine motorsport achieved remarkable victories.
