= Esteban Fernandino =

Esteban Fernandino may refer to:

- Esteban Fernandino I, Argentine racing driver, father of Chango Fernandino
- Esteban Fernandino II, Argentine racing driver, better known as Chango and son of Esteban Fernandino I
