= Suppici =

Suppici is a surname. Notable people with the surname include:

- Alberto Suppici (1898–1981), Uruguayan footballer and coach
  - Estadio Profesor Alberto Suppici, an stadium in Colonia, Uruguay
- Héctor Suppici Sedes (1903–1948), Uruguayan racing driver
