= Gran Premio del Sur =

Motorsport competition in South America

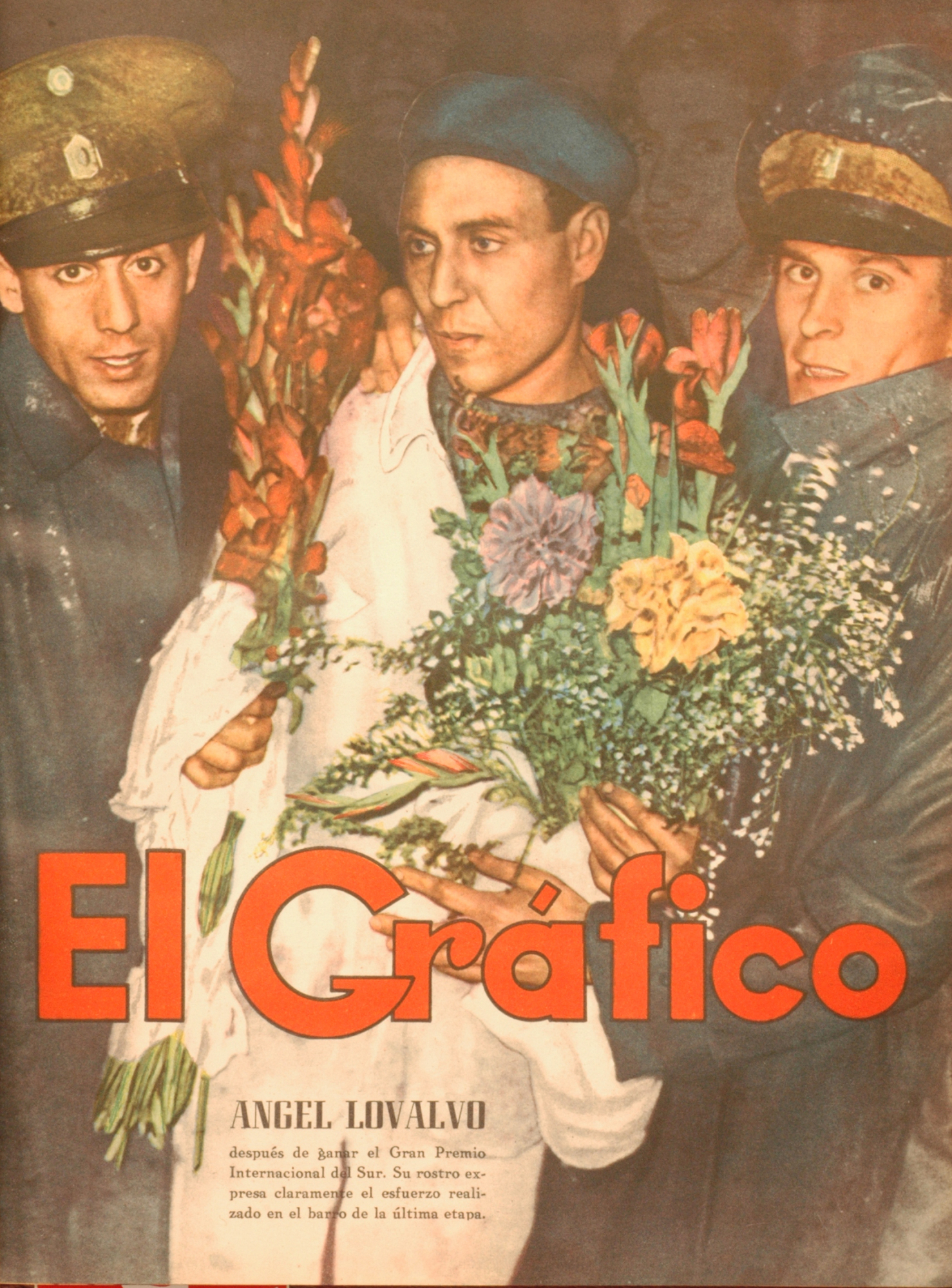
Ángel Lo Valvo after winning the Gran Premio del Sur in 1939, as it appeared in the El Gráfico magazine of April 14, 1939

The Gran Premio del Sur (Southern Grand Prix) was a motorsport competition held on three occasions between 1938 and 1942, on public roads in southern Argentina and Chile.

This competition, which was held with Turismo Carretera cars, was created as a complement to the Road Grand Prix that was organized annually by the Automóvil Club Argentino (ACA) and which generally took place on roads in the north of the country.

Interrupted by the outbreak of the Second World War, the last edition took place in 1942.

== History ==
Year	Edition	Category	Route	Distance (km)	Driver Co-driver	Car	Avg. (Km/h)
1938	XXI*	TC	Buenos Aires; Santa Rosa; Esquel; Comodoro Rivadavia; Río Gallegos; Bahía Blanca; Mar del Plata; La Plata	6224 (9 stages)	Héctor Suppici Sedes; José Miguel Brausse	Ford V8	90.436
1939	XXIII*	TC	Buenos Aires; Santa Rosa; Mendoza; Santiago; Temuco; Neuquén; Esquel; Comodoro Rivadavia; Tandil; Mar del Plata; La Plata	7212 (11 stages)	Ángel Lo Valvo; Antonio Spampinato	Ford V8	80.856
1940 - 1941	Was not run						
1942	*	TC	Mercedes; General Pico; Río Colorado; Zapala; Cañadón León; Puerto San Julián; El Calafate; Río Gallegos; Punta Arenas; Puerto Deseado; Las Heras; Viedma; Bahía Blanca	7193 (10 stages)	Esteban Fernandino; Pedro Quiña	Ford V8	91.097

- No edition had official numbering, but the 1938 and 1939 editions were included in the retrospective count of the Road Grand Prix editions carried out by ACA in 1951, to which the numbers XXI and XXIII were assigned respectively. Not so in 1942, which was not organized by ACA, but by a local commission from Esquel.
