= General Pacheco =

City in Greater Buenos Aires, Argentina

- City

- Location in Greater Buenos Aires
- Coordinates: 34°27′S 58°39′W
- Country: Argentina
- Province: Buenos Aires
- Partido: Tigre
- Founded: c. 1880
- Elevation: 11 m (36 ft)

Population (2001 census [INDEC])
  - Total: 43,287
- CPA Base: B 1617
- Area code: +54 11

General Pacheco is a city in the Tigre Partido of the urban agglomeration of Greater Buenos Aires, Argentina. It is a suburb located approximately 38 km north of downtown Buenos Aires and just a few blocks away from the Pan-American Highway. According to the 2001 census, General Pacheco had 43,287 inhabitants, making it the second most populous city in Tigre.

== History ==
The city of General Pacheco is named for General Ángel Pacheco (1793–1869), an Argentine military officer who fought alongside José de San Martín and later served as a commander under Juan Manuel de Rosas during the Argentine War of Independence and the Argentine Civil Wars. The present-day city is built on the site of Pacheco's rural estate, known as the Estancia El Talar de Pacheco. A school and chapel built on lands originally belonging to this estate were inaugurated on 4 May 1886.

== Economy ==
Several major corporations in various industries have manufacturing facilities and assembly plants located in General Pacheco or nearby. Kraft Foods is located in the area and the Techint Group has an industrial plant there. In 2006, there were 161 occupied factories with a total of 7,135 workers.

The shortwave-transmitter of Radiodifusión Argentina al Exterior (RAE), Argentina's state-owned international broadcaster, is located in General Pacheco and can be heard all over the world.

=== Motor industry ===
General Pacheco is home to Ford Motor Argentina and Volkswagen Argentina. Argentina's assembly sector includes these two along with CIADEA, Sevel, General Motors, FIAT, Toyota and Autolatina. The sector is composed of 400 firms and 35,700 employees and contributes to 0.45 percent of the country's GDP, accounting for 16% of the automotive industry's output.

Ford Argentina's Pacheco Stamping and Assembly factory was constructed in the city of General Pacheco in 1961 and produced the Ford Falcon from 1962 to 1991. After its establishment, through modifications in indigenous institutional arrangements.

These large industries have direct impacts on populations, which are also the populations that do most of the work for the industry. Ford hired a workforce in which 90 percent had a high school education but only one-third had a university degree. Assembly plants like the Ford Falcon plant rely primarily on young, educated workers with little industrial experience. Workers generally come into the motor industry at around the age of 23, usually working in agriculture first. A combination of school and training became central to the plant's operation in order to continue to manufacture automobiles.

49 percent of workers in these plants have completed elementary school, 19 percent have completed secondary school and only 6 prcent have a university degree. Large educated labors and schools, such as Henry Ford Technical School in General Pacheco, have helped the plant's operation.

=== Food industry ===
The main production plant of Kraft Foods Argentina (KFTA) is located in General Pacheco. In 2009, there was a major H1N1 influenza outbreak which began in Mexico in late March and made its way to Argentina that same year. This outbreak had a direct effect on the workers of the company. 150 workers were laid off, making it the largest labor-management conflict in Argentina in 2009. This led to a picket on the Pan-American Highway. The workers asked for a raise in salary of 70 percent and requested one month of paid leave in the hope of avoiding the flu. Both of these requests were rejected by the company. Management wanted to prevent the workers from benefiting from future collective bargains. 40 workers experienced an violent eviction by the police force.
