= Pacheco Stamping and Assembly =

General Pacheco Stamping and Assembly
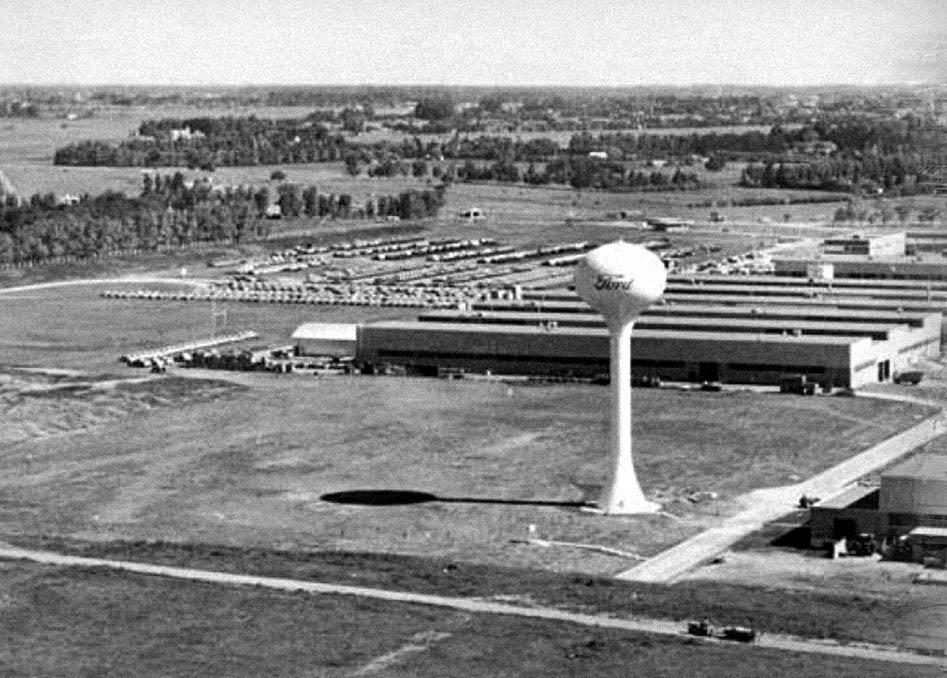
- Ford assembly plant in General Pacheco
- Operated: 1961; 65 years ago
- Location: General Pacheco, Buenos Aires Province, Argentina
- Industry: Automotive
- Products: Automobiles, trucks
- Employees: 3,500
- Area: 14,079,200 square feet (1,308,000 m^{2})
- Owner: Ford Argentina
- Website: ford.com.ar/plantapacheco

The Pacheco Stamping and Assembly is a Ford Motor Company automobile factory in General Pacheco, Argentina, opened in 1961, and spanning 1,308,000 square metres (14,079,200 sq ft). As of 2018, the plant employs 3,500 workers.

== Vehicles manufactured ==
Since the plant opening in 1961:

| Name | Type | Produced |
|---|---|---|
| F-100/150 | Pickup truck | 1961–1997 (Note: Only assembled in the plant of La Boca (1959–61), and then fully manufactured (starting in 1961) in General Pacheco.) |
| F-600/700 | Truck | 1961–1992 |
| F-350/400/500 | Medium-duty truck | 1961–1992 |
| Falcon (Note: Assembled only (1962–63); from 1963 that year, the Falcon became the first Ford 4-door sedan fully produced in Argentina.) | Sedan / station wagon | 1962–1991 |
| Fairlane | Mid-size | 1969–1981 |
| Falcon Ranchero (Note: Not the original Ford Ranchero but an adapted local Falcon body.) | Coupé utility | 1973–1991 |
| Taunus | Mid-size | 1974–1983 |
| Sierra | Mid-size | 1984–1993 |
| Escort | C-segment | 1987–2002 |
| Orion | C-segment | 1994–1997 |
| Ranger (Note: Updated to the T6 (sixth generation), released in 2020.) | Pickup truck | 1996–present |
| Focus | Compact (Note: Introduced by Ford Europe in 1998. The third generation of the Focus was released in 2011 with similar design for both markets, Europe and North America.) | 1999–2019 |
| Cargo | Truck | 1999–2000 |

== See also ==
- List of Ford factories
