= Ford Orion =

Small family car

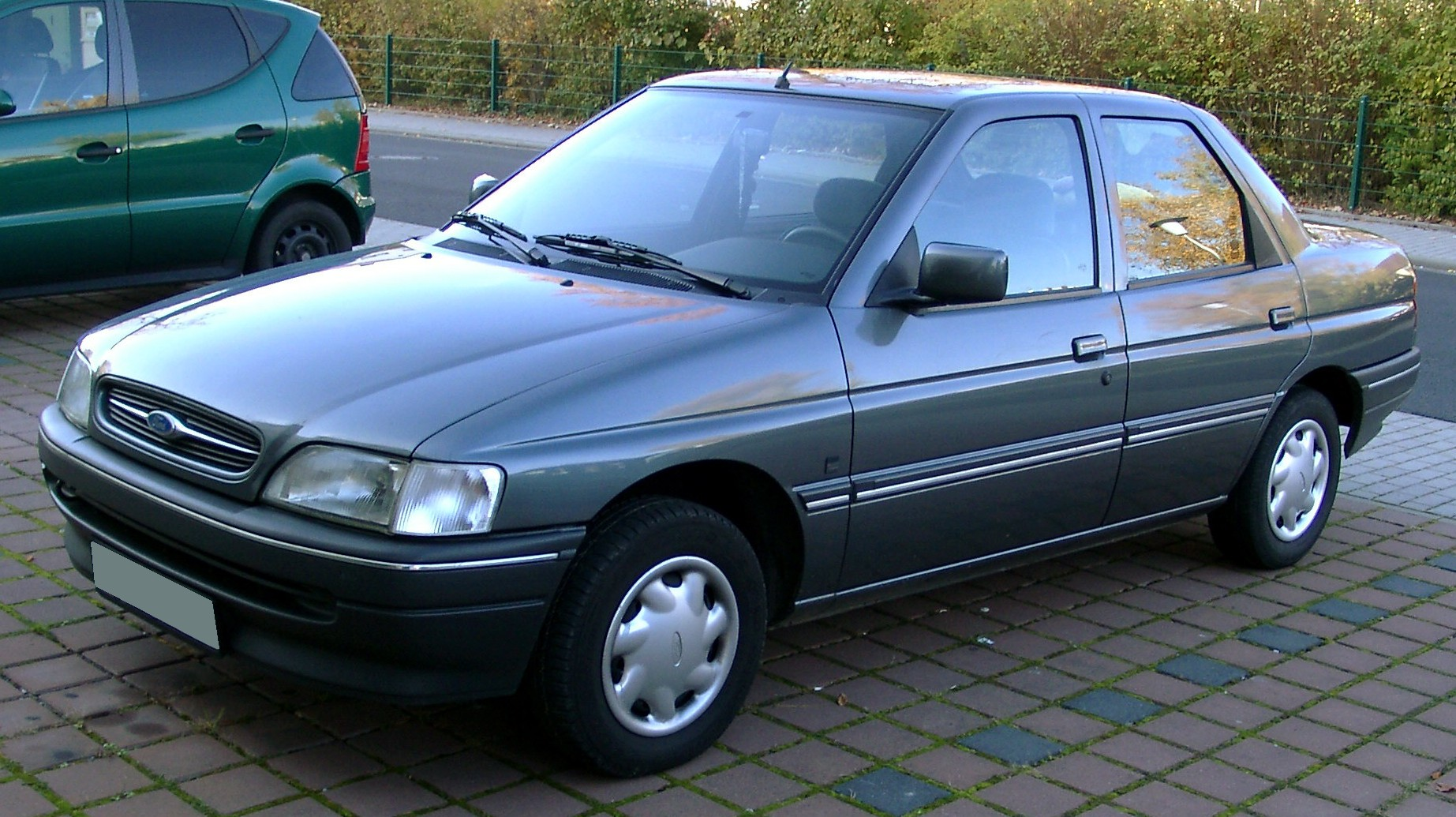

Overview
- Manufacturer: Ford Europe
- Production: September 1983 – September 1993
- Assembly: United Kingdom: Halewood (Halewood Body & Assembly); Germany: Saarlouis; Brazil: São Bernardo do Campo (Ford Brazil); Spain: Almussafes; Argentina: General Pacheco (Ford Argentina); Venezuela: Valencia

Body and chassis
- Class: Small family car (C)
- Body style: 4-door notchback saloon 2-door notchback saloon (Brazil)
- Layout: Front engine, Front-wheel-drive
- Related: Ford Escort; Ford Verona; Volkswagen Apollo

Powertrain
- Engine: 1296 cc OHV "Valencia/HCS" Straight-4; 1296 cc OHC "CVH" Straight-4; 1598 cc OHC "CVH" Straight-4; 1597 cc DOHC "Zetec" Straight-4; 1796 cc DOHC "Zetec" Straight-4; 1753 cc OHC "Endura-D" Straight-4 Diesel
- Transmission: Ford BC4 4-speed manual Ford BC5 5-speed manual Ford ATX 3-speed automatic

Chronology
- Predecessor: Ford Escort (1968–1980); Ford Cortina (1962–1982)
- Successor: Ford Escort Saloon (1993–1998)

The Ford Orion is a small family car (C-segment in Europe) that was produced by Ford Europe from 1983 until 1993. A total of 3,534,239 units were sold during the car's ten-year production life.

The Ford Orion was based on the Ford Escort, but instead of the Escort's hatchback, the Orion had a separate boot, making it a four-door saloon. Visually, the Ford Orion's notchback rear end and greater rear overhang made it readily distinguishable from the Escort.

The nameplate Orion is derived from the constellation, named after a Greek hunter.

== History ==
=== Orion Mark I (1983–1986) ===
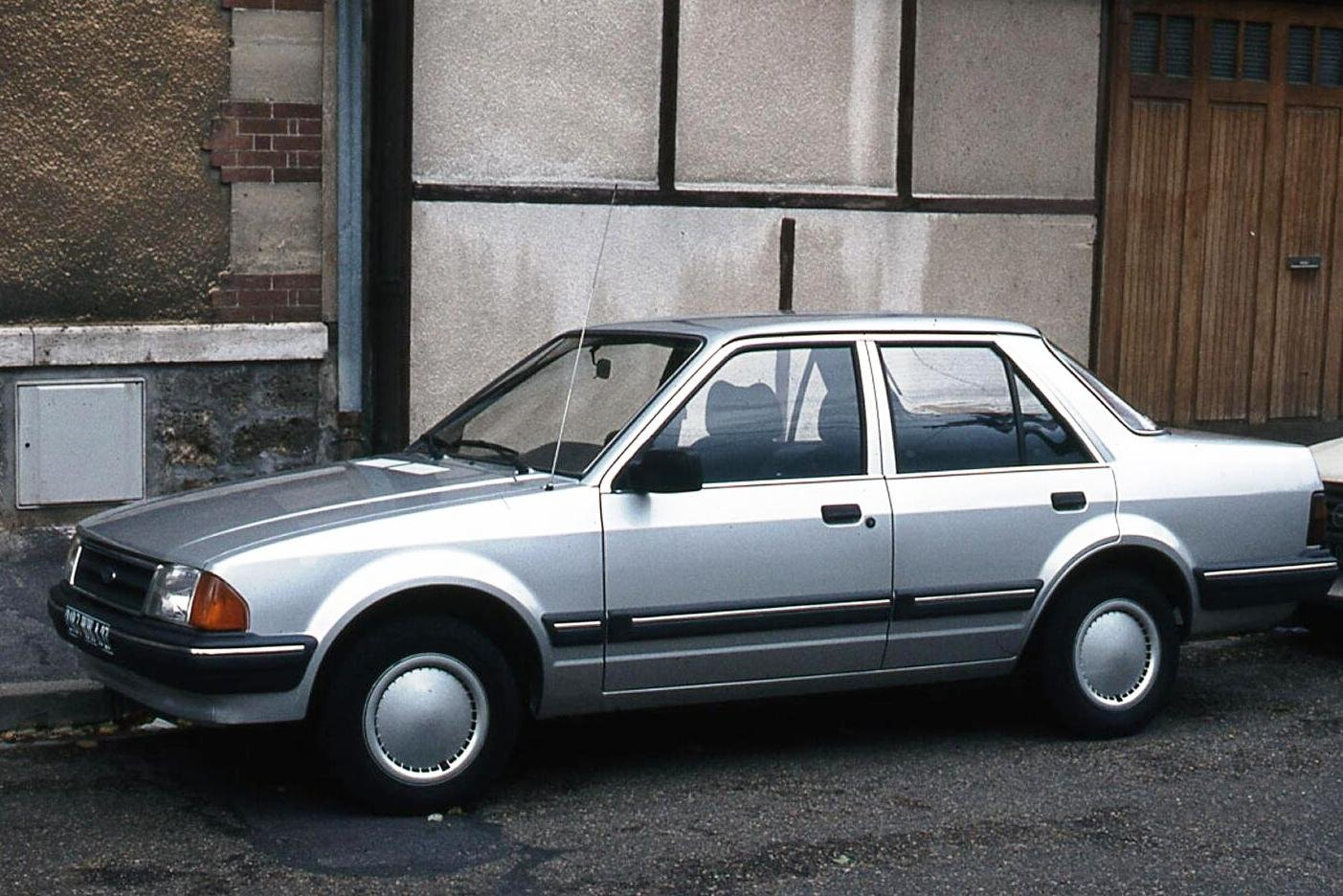
Ford Orion GL Mark I

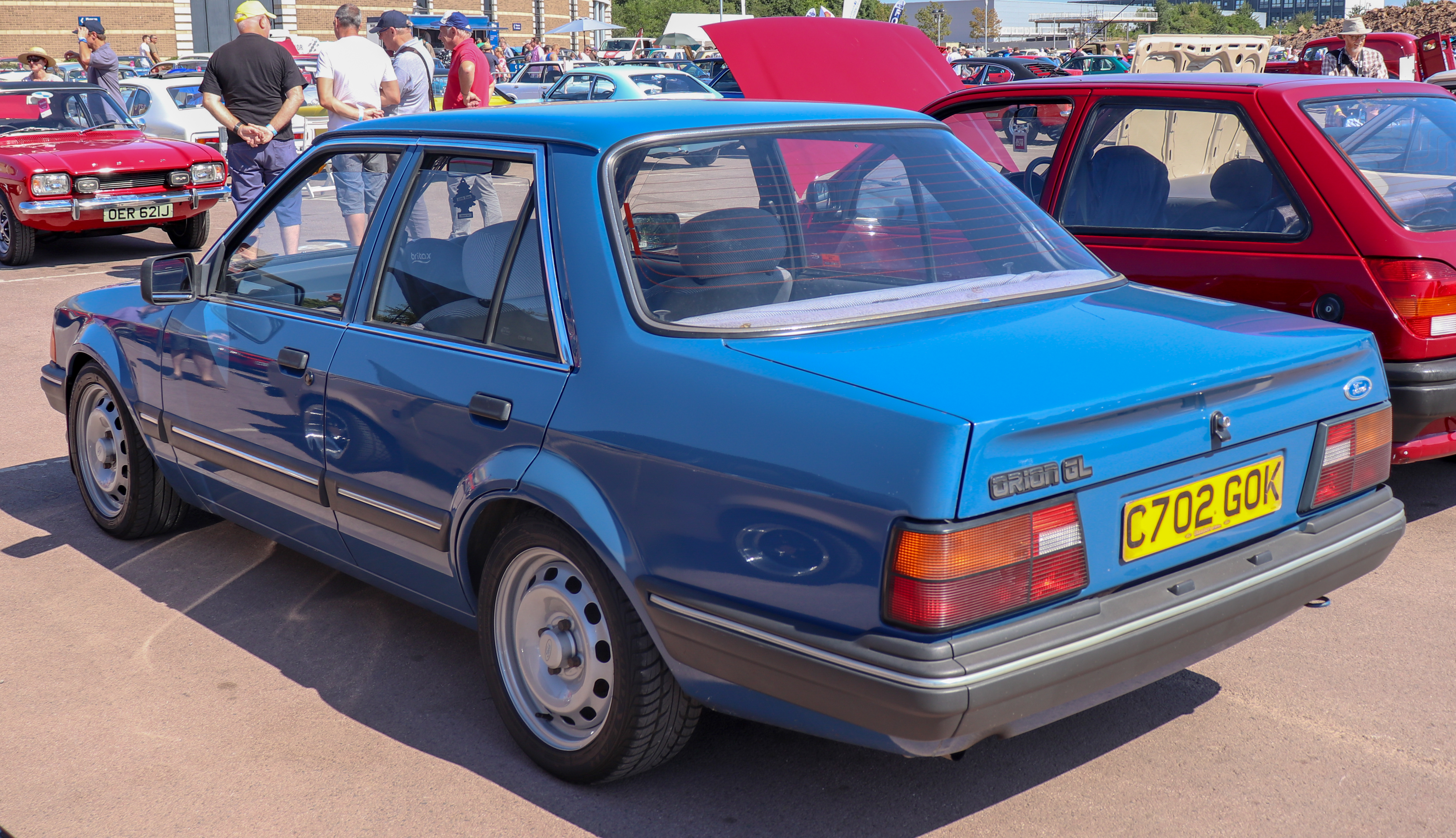
Ford Orion GL Mark I rear

In the early-1980s, Ford's model line-up and image was changing, reflecting shifting patterns in the new car market across Western Europe at this time, as front-wheel drive gradually became more popular than rear-wheel drive and hatchbacks began to eclipse traditional saloons and estates. The company's older saloon line-up was replaced mainly by hatchbacks, starting with the Escort MK3 in 1980 and the new Sierra which replaced the Cortina in 1982. By 1985, even the executive-class Granada would offer a hatchback bodystyle, with the saloon and estate models not being released until 1990 and 1992 respectively, while a saloon version of the Sierra, called the Sapphire, was finally launched in 1987.

The Orion was developed under the codename "Apollo." Launched in September 1983, the Orion was designed to fill the market demand for a traditional four-door saloon which had been absent from the Escort range since the end of MK2 production in 1980 and also in larger cars by the demise of the hugely popular Cortina in 1982. The Orion looked similar to a contemporary Escort at the front apart from the different grille design, but the rear of the Orion had a long flat boot (making the car a three-box saloon design) rather than a hatchback or estate body like the Escort. Although the Orion's length was similar to that of the contemporary Ford Sierra (then only available as a hatchback or an estate) it had more rear legroom and a larger boot. This concept was similar to the Volkswagen Jetta, the saloon version of the Golf hatchback which had been on sale since 1979.

Ford initially offered the Orion in only GL and Ghia trim levels, missing out on the lower specification levels available on the Escort, as well as the basic 1100cc engine. Only 1300 cc and 1600 cc CVH engine options were available from launch (though with both carburettor and fuel injection options on the 1.6 Ghia). A lower specification L model was introduced in 1984, as was the option of a 1.6 diesel engine on L and GL models.

The Orion Ghia 1.6i standard features included: central locking, sunroof, sport front seats, electric windows, rear head restraints, tachometer and an information binnacle informing the driver when the vehicle needed maintenance. All of these features were rare equipment on a small family car in the 1980s, giving the Orion upmarket pretensions.

The Orion 1.6i shared an engine with the Escort XR3i and offered similar performance and handling without the insurance unfriendly tag that the XR badge started to command in the late-1980s due to its popularity with car thieves - and it was also less frequently targeted by thieves than the Escort XR3i or RS Turbo. The 1.6i was topped by a luxury limited edition called the 1600E in the autumn of 1988, the 1600E name harking back to the Mark II Ford Cortina 1600E from twenty years earlier, as both were considered to be well-equipped saloon cars with decent performance for the working man. The Orion 1600E was available in black, white and metallic grey and had RS alloys, wood cappings on the dashboard and doors, and grey leather seats. Only 1,600 were made, of which 1,000 had leather trim.

With the facelift in 1986, Ford brought the styling and engineering of the Orion closer to the Escort's and lower-specification models crept into the range along with equipment levels being brought together between the two cars, and helped Orion sales increase further. The Orion also gained the new 1.4 "lean burn" petrol engine which was added to the Escort at this time.

The success of the Orion across Europe, particularly in the UK (where it was amongst the top 10 best-selling cars every year from 1984 to 1990), was followed by several other manufacturers launching saloon versions of their popular hatchbacks. By 1986, General Motors had launched a saloon version of its Opel Kadett/Vauxhall Astra hatchback, which was sold as the Vauxhall Belmont on the British market. Austin Rover, on the other hand, made use of a Honda design for its new Rover 200 Series saloon, which was launched in 1984 and gave buyers a booted alternative to the Maestro hatchback, although with a totally different platform; as the true booted variant of the Maestro was the larger and more upmarket Austin Montego. The Orion was launched around the same time as the Fiat Regata, saloon and estate versions of the Ritmo (sold under name "Strada" in the UK), although the Regata was aimed further upmarket at cars like the Ford Sierra.

The Orion was a strong seller in the UK, peaking as the seventh-best-selling car in 1987 and 1988 with over 70,000 sales each time.

=== Orion Mark II (1986–1990) ===
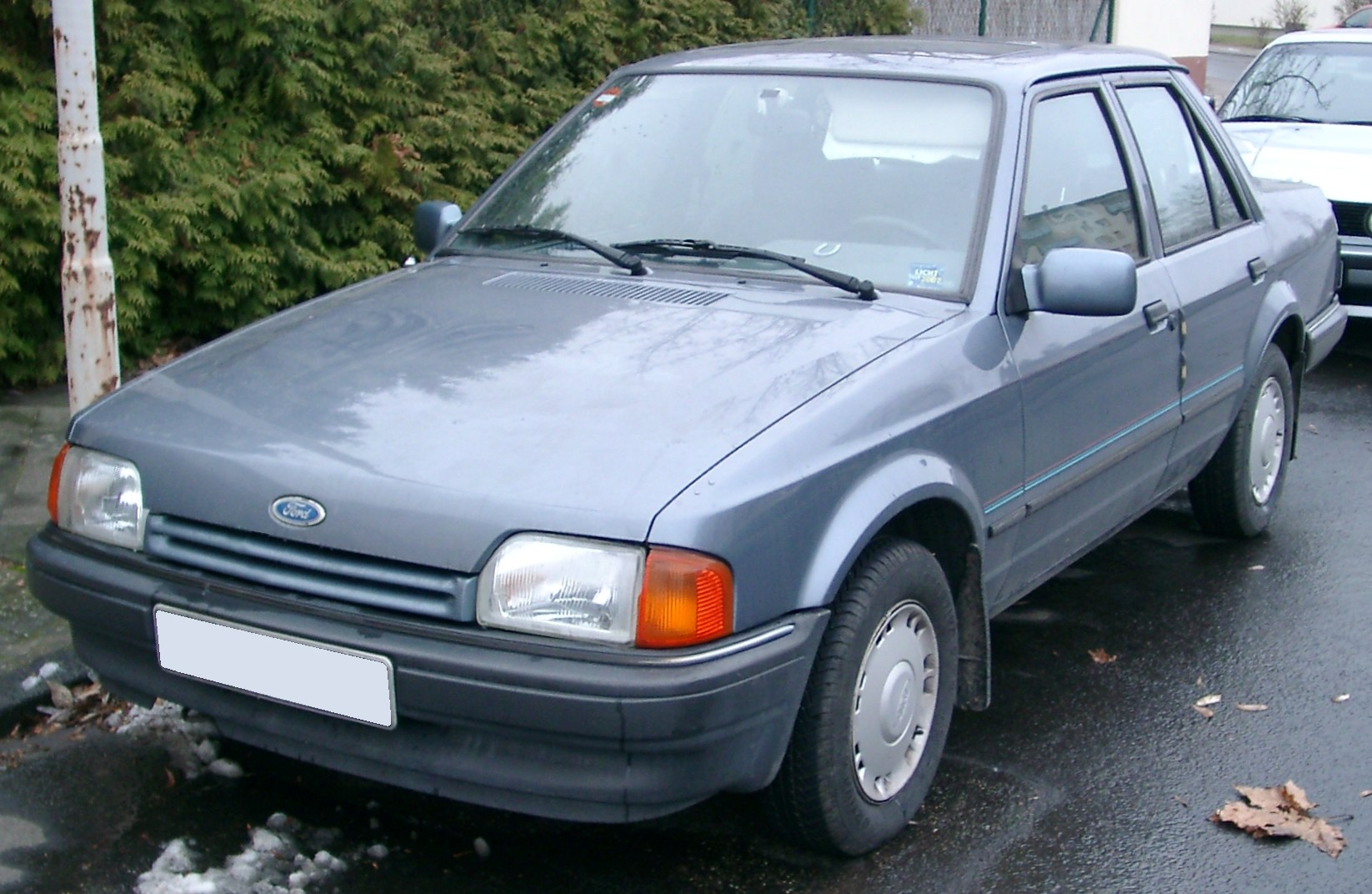
Ford Orion Mark II

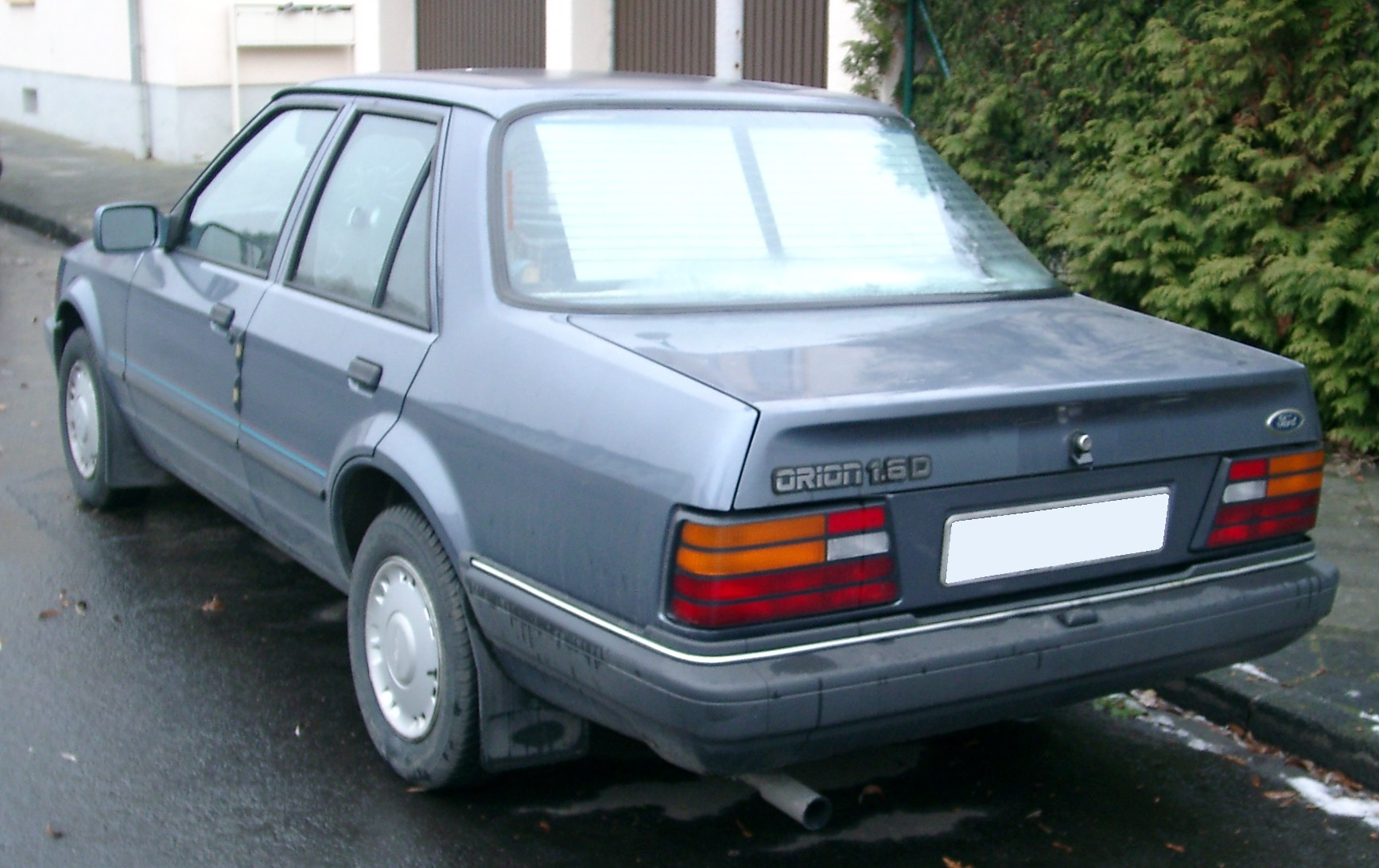
Ford Orion Mark II rear

March 1986 saw the Orion getting the same facelift as the Escort. Internally within Ford it is regarded as an updated model (Apollo-86) rather than a new generation, although it is popularly known as the Mark II. The Mark II brought the option of anti-lock-brakes (ABS) and a heated front windscreen to the range. The base "L" version came with an additional 1.3 litre engine option which used the OHV "'Valencia' engine as used on the Escort, whilst a new 1.4 litre CVH engine option was introduced. This (along with the 1.6 CVH ) was a "lean burn unit" and various models in the range could run on unleaded fuel without modifications to the cylinder head or to the fuel system. Improved locks were fitted across the range initially being of the Chubb AVA design but soon after replaced with the Tibbe type; same as with the Escort, and a number of other improvements were carried out including new suspension and gearbox mounts, updated interior and trim changes, improved soundproofing and revised steering and suspension settings. Trim levels now included the entry-level L, Biscane (special edition) LX, Equipe (special edition) GL, GLS (special edition), Ghia, Ghia Injection and from 1988 the 1600E (special edition).

=== Orion Mark III (1990–1993) ===
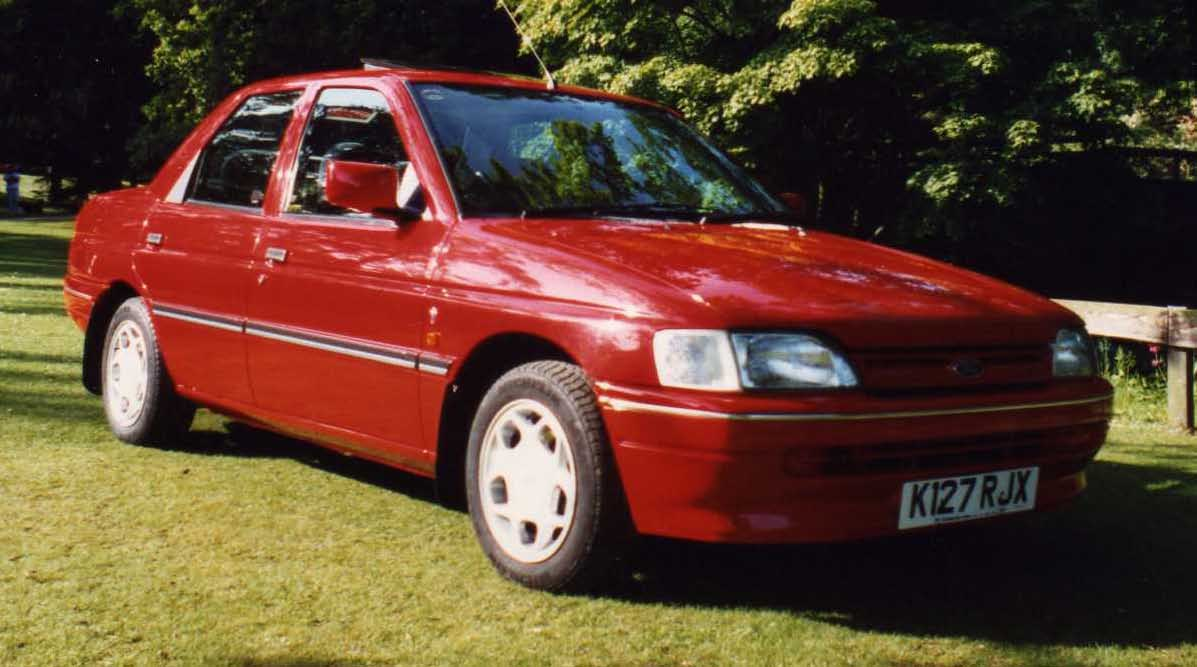
Front end of pre-facelift Ford Orion 1.4 Ghia Mark III in Radiant Red

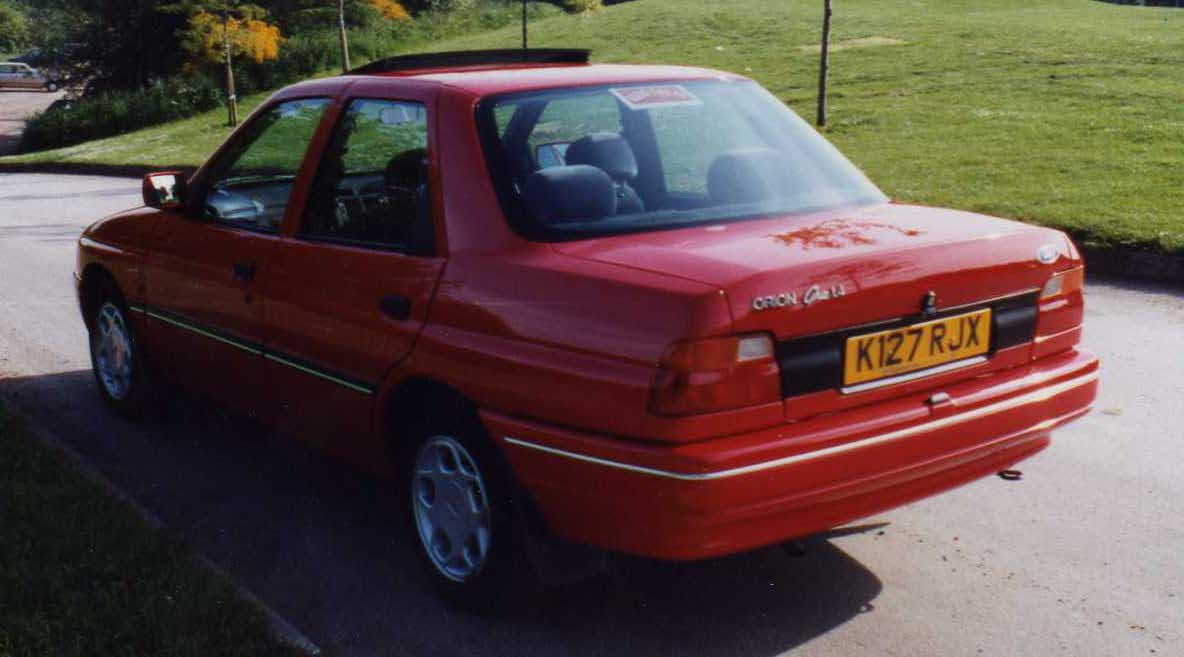
Ford Orion Mk III Ghia

The third and final version of the Orion was launched in September 1990, but received the same criticism from the motoring media that the fifth generation Escort endured at the time for its lack of design flair as well as the disappointing refinement of some of its engines — particularly the 1.3 and 1.4-litre CVH petrol units. As with the Escort, the arrival of the 1.6 and 1.8 litre Zetec 16 valve engines and suspension changes in late 1991 and late 1992 improved the Orion's dynamic qualities. The Mark III was identified at the front by clear indicator lenses and by a chrome bar that ran through the radiator grille. The range topping Orion Ghia Si (sports injection) had 130 bhp (97 kW) out of its 1.8L DOHC Zetec unit, making this the fastest production model Orion that Ford produced through the car's ten-year production life, with a top speed of 126 mph. A facelift to the Escort and Orion range including side impact bars, front seatbelt pretensioners and a safety cage as well as body colour door handles and the new Zetec engines in September 1992 for the 1993 model year also saw many major improvements.

This incarnation of the Orion was considerably less popular than the pre-1990 versions, just missing out on a place in the top 10 best-selling cars in Britain in 1991 and 1992.

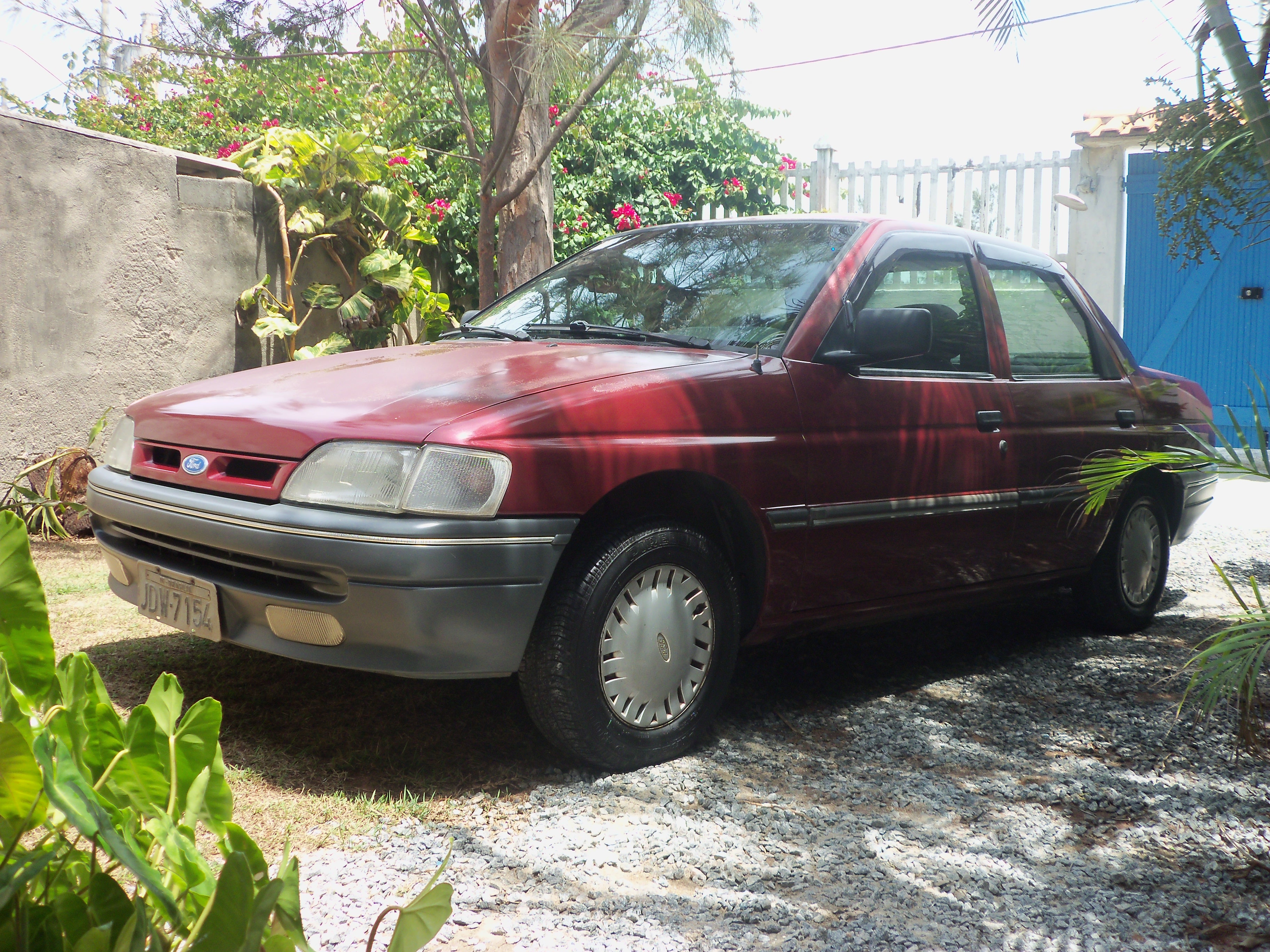
Brazilian built 1994 Ford Verona/Orion.

Trim levels were:

- L (1992–1993), 1.8 diesel
- LX (1990–1993), 1.3, 1.4, 1.6, 1.8 16v petrol, 1.8 diesel
- GLX (1990–1991), 1.3, 1.4, 1.6 petrol (dropped after 1991)
- Ghia (1990–1993), 1.3, 1.4, 1.6, 1.8 16v petrol, 1.8 diesel
- Ghia Si (1992–1993), 1.8 16v petrol

On 19 September 1993, 10 years after its launch, Ford retired the Orion nameplate, and the Escort nameplate was used on all bodystyles. This was a move that Vauxhall had previously taken with the Belmont name back in September 1991. Sales of the Escort badged saloon were not as strong as those achieved by the Orion, as saloons of this size continued to fall in popularity throughout the 1990s. The slow-selling Escort saloon was eventually discontinued in October 1998, along with the convertible model after the launch of the Focus saloon, although the 5-door hatchback and estate versions lasted until July 2000 and the van lasted until 2002.
