= Esteban Fernandino I =

Argentine racecar driver (1908–1976)

Esteban Fernandino (1908–1976) was an Argentine racecar driver. A native of Coronel Pringles, he was also known as Esteban Fernandino senior or Esteban Fernandino I, as his son Esteban "Chango" Fernandino also became a well-known driver. Among his greatest successes were his victories in the Mil Millas Argentinas race of 1940 and the Gran Premio del Sur of 1942. Both victories landed him on the coveted cover of El Grafico magazine.

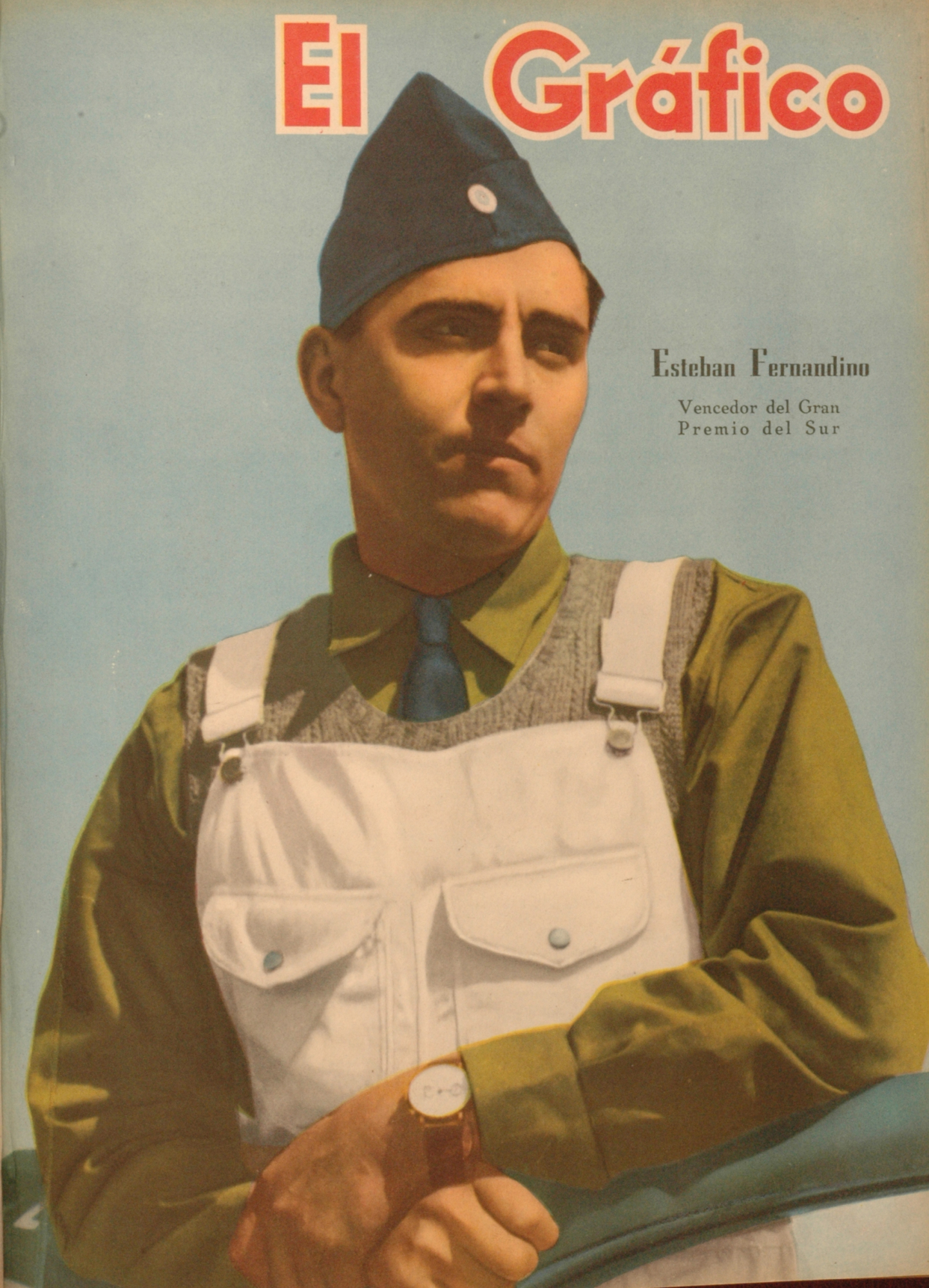
Esteban Fernandino - El Gráfico 1178

== Racing record ==
- 1938: 3^{o} Rio Negro-Neuquen-Chubut
- 1939: 6^{o} Gran Premio Argentino
- 1940: 1^{o} Mil Millas Argentinas
- 1941: 3^{o} Mil Millas Argentinas
- 1942: 1^{o} Gran Premio Argentino al Sur
- 1947: 2^{o} Doble Vta de la Ventana, 13º Gran Premio Internacional
- 1950: 4^{o} Rio Diamante Mza.
- 1951: 6^{o} Vta.del Norte
- 1952: 2^{o} C.Rivadavia, 14^{a} C.Pringles
