= Héctor Suppici Sedes =

Uruguayan racecar driver

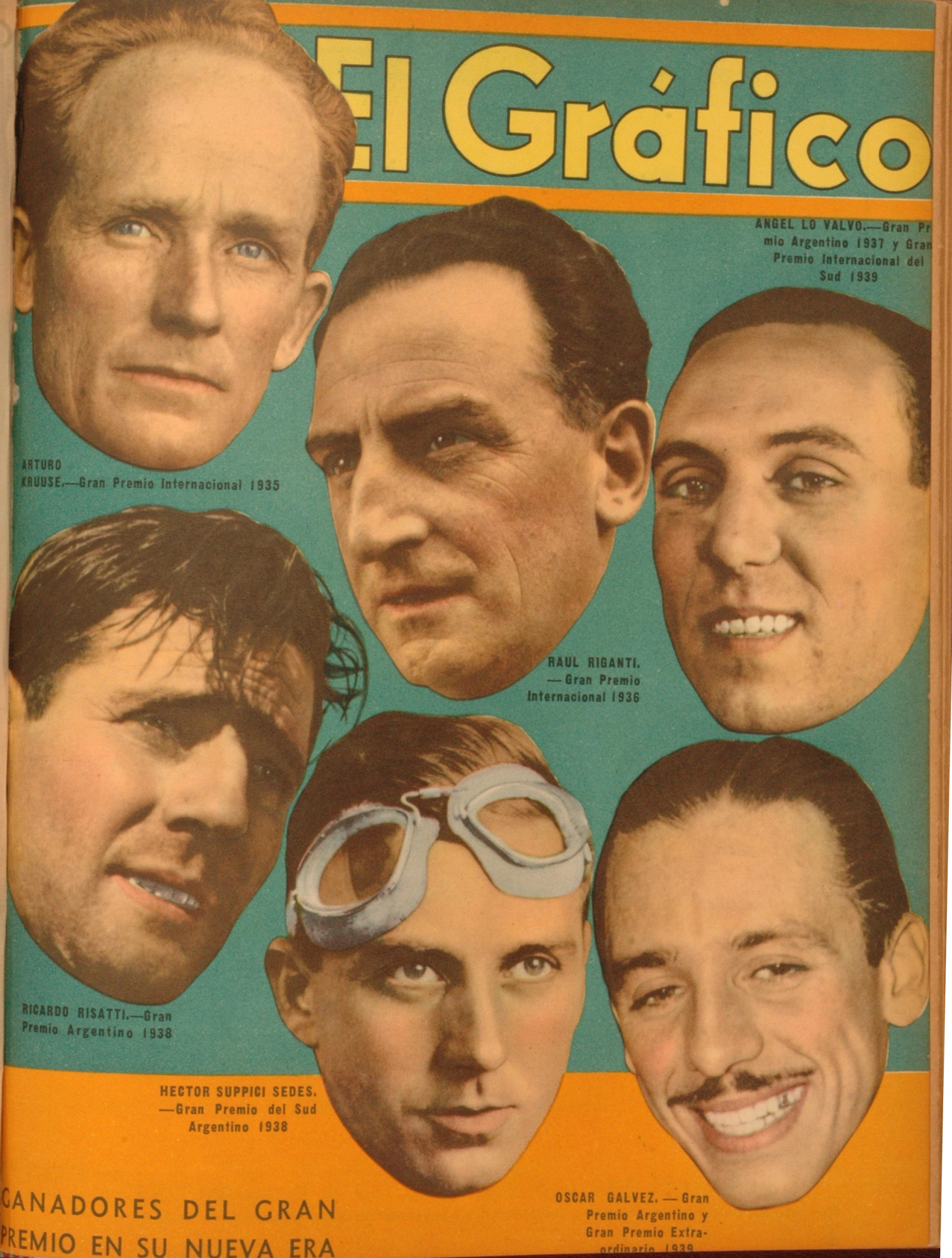
- Suppici Sedes (bottom centre)
- Nationality: Uruguayan
- Born: 15 March 1903 Montevideo, Uruguay
- Died: 4 December 1948 (aged 45) Victoria, Malleco, Chile

Hector Suppici Sedes (15 March 1903 – 4 December 1948) was an Uruguayan racing driver. The first winner of the Grand Prix of the South, he was also a skilled mechanic and was known for his many innovations in racing technique and racecar management.

== Biography ==
He was born in Montevideo, the cousin of Alberto Suppici, who later became the first football manager to win the FIFA World Cup. He was known in his neighbourhood of La Blanqueada as "El gaucho" and "El inventor". He had notable success as a professional driver, winning the Uruguayan National Grand Prix four times and also the Buenos Aires-Mendoza race in 1935. In 1938, he had his greatest triumph, winning the Southern Grand Prix (El Gran Premio del Sur), which covered all of Patagonia. Suppici covered the 6,224 kilometers in 60 hours 49 minutes and 37 seconds, at an average of 90.436 kilometers per hour.

His contemporaries were drivers such as Juan Manuel Fangio, “Hipomenes” Angel Lo Valvo, “El indio rubio” Arturo Kruuse, the Gálvez brothers and Raúl Riganti. He was also a friend of intellectuals and writers such as Juan José Morosoli (author of "Journey to the Sea") and Julio César Castro (aka Juceca, the creator of Don Verídico). Pintín Castellanos composed and dedicated the milonga “Meta fierro” to him, which Juan D'Arienzo recorded in 1939.

Suppici Sedes was killed in a crash in the Gran Premio Internacional del Norte, the final round of the 1948 Turismo Carretera season. Looking for a refueling point, he stopped on the course to make a U-turn and was hit in the drivers' door by Antonio Zarantonello, who swerved onto the wrong side of the road having been hindered by dust and spectators.

He was commemorated in an Uruguayan postage stamp in 1973.
