= Ford Motor Argentina =

Argentine subsidiary of Ford

Ford Argentina S.C.A.

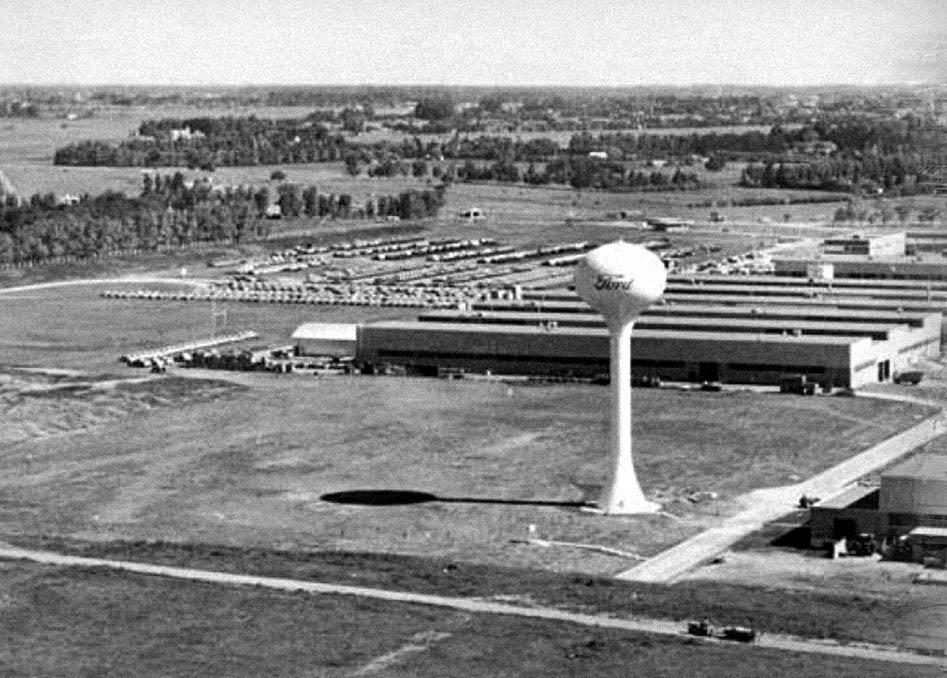
- Ford assembly plant in General Pacheco
- Type: Subsidiary
- Industry: Automotive
- Founded: 1913; 113 years ago
- Founder: Henry Ford
- Headquarters: Pacheco Stamping and Assembly, General Pacheco
- Key people: Martín Galdeano (president)
- Products: Automobiles, trucks
- Number of employees: 3,500 (2018)
- Parent: Ford Motor Co.
- Website: ford.com.ar

Ford Argentina S.C.A. is the Argentine subsidiary of Ford Motor Company founded in Buenos Aires in 1913. Its first products were Model Ts assembled from complete knock down (CKD) kits provided by Ford Motor Company in 1917. Nevertheless, Ford Motor Argentina is best known in more recent times for producing the Ford Focus and, previously, the Argentine version of the Ford Falcon, originally a U.S. model introduced in Argentina in 1961, but adapted to the Argentine market.

In South America, Ford's primary operations are in Brazil, Argentina and Ford Andina. (Venezuela, Colombia and Ecuador) Ford employs over 18,000 people and operates seven assembly or other plants in the region.

== History ==
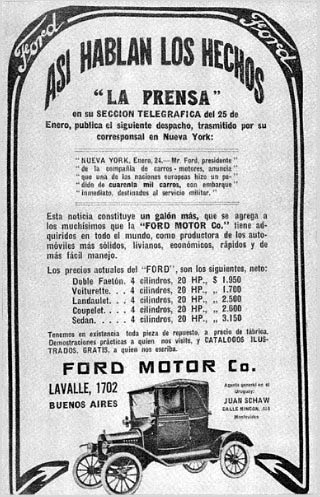
1915 Ford advertisement published in La Prensa newspaper featuring the model T

In 1913, Ford entered the Argentine market, and in 1916, Buenos Aires became home to the first assembly operation of Ford products in Latin America and the second worldwide after Ford of Britain. Dismantled cars were assembled in Argentina at the plant on Herrera Street, in the Barracas neighborhood of Buenos Aires. That same year, the parent company invested US$240,000 for the construction of an assembly plant in La Boca, another neighborhood of Buenos Aires. In 1922 the plant was inaugurated with the production of the model T, which was imported and assembled locally with a 20% parts manufactured in Argentina. By 1927, 100,000 units had been produced in Argentina. That same year the model A was launched.

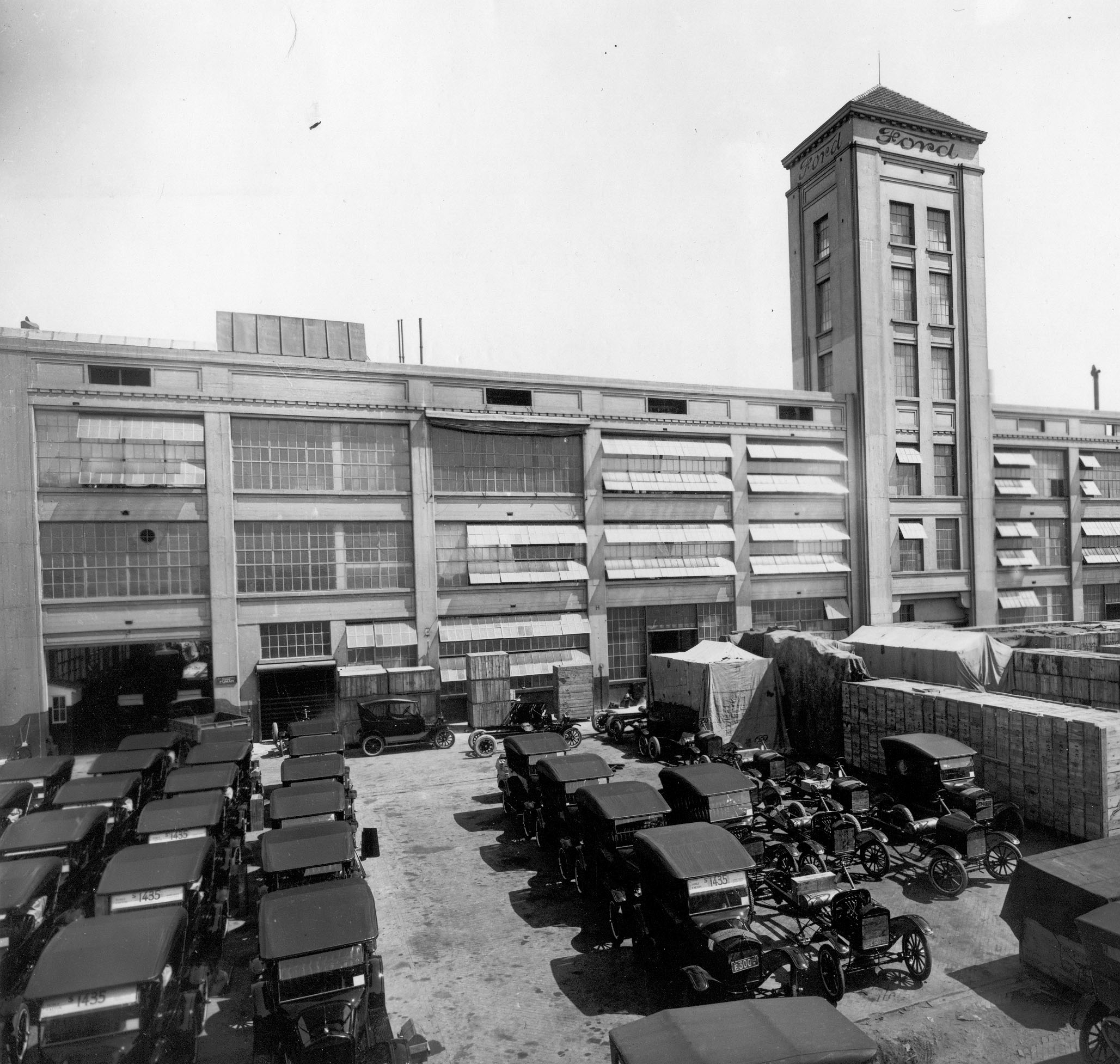
Ford assembly plant in La Boca, c. 1922

At the time, the products reached customers through a network of 285 dealers. The administrative staff and the personnel of paid workers came to 400. Later, and due to the rising demand the plant was enlarged, coming its staff to 1,500 people.

In 1939, with the Second World War outbreak, the importation of vehicles and components was closed. The production was restricted to finishing the units with the available material, but the increasing lack of basic supplies for the production forced to stop the activity. During this time, Ford manufactured batteries and it attended its clients with the sale of spare parts and car accessories made in local repair shops. Later, this would give rise to the beginning of the Argentine auto part industry. The first Ford trucks were imported to Argentina in 1930.

After the WWII concluded, Ford Argentina restarted activities at La Boca in late 1946, but production was interrupted again in 1948, which remained until 1957. In 1959, the company started production of the first commercial vehicles, F-series pickups, F-600 trucks, and chassis for B-600 colectivos. The former "Ford Motor Argentina S.A." was incorporated in 1959. The F-600 medium-duty trucks were also produced by then. One year later, the company started to build a new assembly plant in General Pacheco, Buenos Aires Province to increase its capacity of production. The General Pacheco Assembly Plant was officially inaugurated in 1961. It has a surface area of 252,000 m2 covered (out of 1,308,000 m2 total).

The first vehicle to be produced at General Pacheco was the Falcon in 1962. The offer expanded with the Fairlane, released in 1969 and targeted to the luxury car market. Nevertheless, the 1973 oil crisis and its consequences (such as the increase of prices more than 300%) forced manufacturers to produce smaller and low fuel consumption vehicles. Therefore, in 1974 Ford launched the Taunus (a mid-size car originally designed by Ford Germany), the first European-based car to be produced by Ford Argentina. In 1979 the Falcon became Argentina's top selling car with 28,522 units sold, accomplishment repeated six times. In 1982, Ford had a 38% share in the Argentina market.

Ford Argentina opened a truck assembly and paint plant in 1982. One year later, the Taunus n° 1,000,000 was produced at General Pacheco. In 1984, Ford Argentina launched the Sierra, another mid-size designed by Uwe Bahnsen, Bob Lutz, and Patrick le Quément for Ford Europe.

In 1987, AutoLatina Argentina, a joint venture formed by the merger of Ford Motor Argentina and Volkswagen Argentina, was established. Each brand maintained their own corporate image, the marketing and sales structures, as well as independent dealerships and service shops. All other departments were consolidated, allowing significant cost cutting, but also cutting the workforce almost in half. Sales figures and profitability were disappointing and the joint venture was dissolved in 1994, and on 1 January 1995, Ford Argentina S.A. was reestablished. Under the Autolatina separation plans, Ford became sole owner of the Pacheco plant (Volkswagen acquired the existing truck plant and converted it for car assembly).

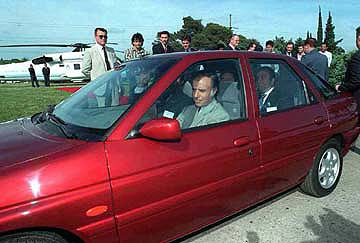
President Carlos Menem driving an Escort model in October 1996, during the ceremony in which the model was released in Argentina

Ford incorporated the production of Escort (European version) and Ranger pickup models. In December 1996, all Ford Argentina plants and the Customer Assistance Division obtained ISO 9002 certification while in 1998 Ford reached 2,000,000 vehicles produced. In April 1999, the Pacheco Assembly Plant obtained ISO 14001 certification.

In 1999 the production of the Focus, a successful Ford global model, started at the Gral. Pacheco Plant. The Focus was honored as the "Car of the Year" in Argentina by two different councils of journalists.

In 2000, Ford held 14.9% of the market share, ranking second in the market. Market participation was 13.4% in cars and 18.9% in trucks; where Ford maintains leadership, production volume was 56.300 units. Ford ranked first among automotive manufacturers regarding exports. By then, only the Focus and Ranger models were produced in the plant.

In 2007, Ford had 12.8% market share, ranking third after Peugeot-Citroën [PCA] (28.5%) and General Motors (20.5%) with a production volume of over 64.000 units. The company also invested US$156.5m in the Pacheco facility

In 2018, two former executives were convicted over kidnapping and torture of company workers during the Argentinian dictatorship in 1976–1983. The men were sentenced to 10 and 12 years.

The increasing interest of consumers towards other type of vehicles (like SUVs) forced Ford Argentina to stop production of the Focus model in 2019. It has been the last sedan to be produced by Ford in Argentina since then. As of 2022, only the Ranger pickup is produced at General Pacheco plant.

== Produced models ==
The list includes Ford models assembled, manufactured, and imported in Argentina, in chronological order:

=== Current models ===
| Name | Type | Origin | Produced | Image |
|---|---|---|---|---|
| Ranger | Pickup truck | USA | 1996–present | |

=== Past models ===
| Name | Type | Origin | Produced | Image |
|---|---|---|---|---|
| Model T (Note: Fully manufactured since 1925. Until then, only assembled.) | Economy | USA | 1917–28 | |
| Model A | Full-size | USA | 1928–32 | |
| F-100/150 | Pickup truck | USA | 1959–97 (Note: Only assembled in the plant of La Boca (1959–61), and then fully manufactured (starting in 1961) in General Pacheco.) | |
| F-600/700 | Truck | USA | 1961–92 | |
| F-350/400/500 | Medium-duty truck | USA | 1961–92 | |
| Falcon (Note: Assembled only (1962–63); from 1963 that year, the Falcon became the first Ford 4-door sedan fully produced in Argentina.) | Sedan / station wagon | USA; ARG (Note: Although the first Falcon produced was based on the North American model, since 1966 its restylings were made in Argentina with no relation with the parent company.) | 1962–91 | |
| Fairlane | Mid-size | USA | 1969–81 | |
| Falcon Ranchero (Note: Not the original Ford Ranchero but an adapted local Falcon body.) | Coupé utility | USA; ARG | 1973–91 | |
| Taunus | Mid-size | GER | 1974–83 | |
| Sierra | Mid-size | EU | 1984–93 | |
| Escort | C-segment | EU | 1987–2002 | |
| Orion | C-segment | EU | 1994–97 | |
| Focus | Compact | EU (Note: Introduced by Ford Europe in 1998. The third generation of the Focus was released in 2011 with similar design for both markets, Europe and North America.) | 1999–2019 | |
| Cargo | Truck | UK | 1999–2000 | |

== Imported models ==
- Laser (1981–83) (Note: Asian version produced from Mazda, imported from Japan.)
- Galaxy (1992–96) (Note: Rebadging of Brazilian Volkswagen Santana, commercialised by former Ford subsidiary AutoLatina.)
- Fiesta (1995–2019) (Note: Originally imported from Spain, one year later Argentina began to import Fiesta manufactured in Brazil.)
- Ka (1997–2021)
- Cargo (1998-2019) (Note: Included models C195E, C1517, C1722, C1932, C2632. Trucks were imported from Brazil.)
- Mondeo (1999–2022)
- EcoSport (2003–2022)
- Kuga (2017–2026) (Note: The line added an hybrid model in 2020.)
- Mustang (1967–present)
- Transit (1997–present)
- Territory (2020–present)
- F-150 Raptor (2020–present)
- Bronco (2020–present)
- S-MAX (2010–19)
- Maverick (2022–present)
- Granada (Europe) (1979–81)

Other imported models

- Mustang (third generation)(1980–1990)
- Fairmont (1980-81)
- Everest (2026–Present)
- Mustang Mach E (2023–Present)
- Taunus 17m (1961–62)
- Courier (1998–2010)
- v8 (1938–39)
- Bronco (Third generation) (1980–82)
- Escape (2001–03)
