= Esteban Fernandino II =

Argentine racecar driver (1944–2007)

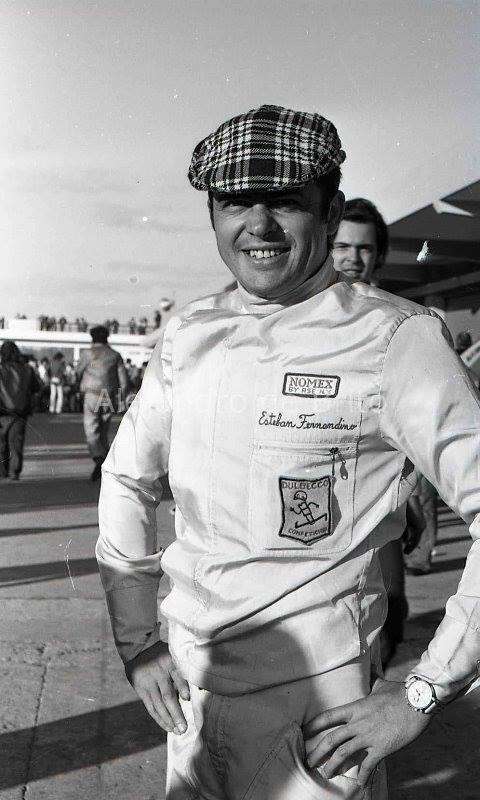
Esteban Fernandino II F1MA 1973

Esteban Fernandino II (1944–2007), better known as Chango, was an Argentine racecar driver. He was born in Coronel Pringles, the son of champion driver Esteban Fernandino I. He was nicknamed Chango to differentiate him from his father.

He made his racing debut in 1966, in a Fiat 1500. He remained active for more than 25 years and had notable success on the racetrack throughout the 1970s and the early 1980s. In the process, he became closely tied with the Ford brand, especially in the TC2000 competition.

He died in Bahia Blanca in 2007 after a long illness.
