= Maimará =

Coordinates: 23°37′S 65°24′W

- Municipality and town
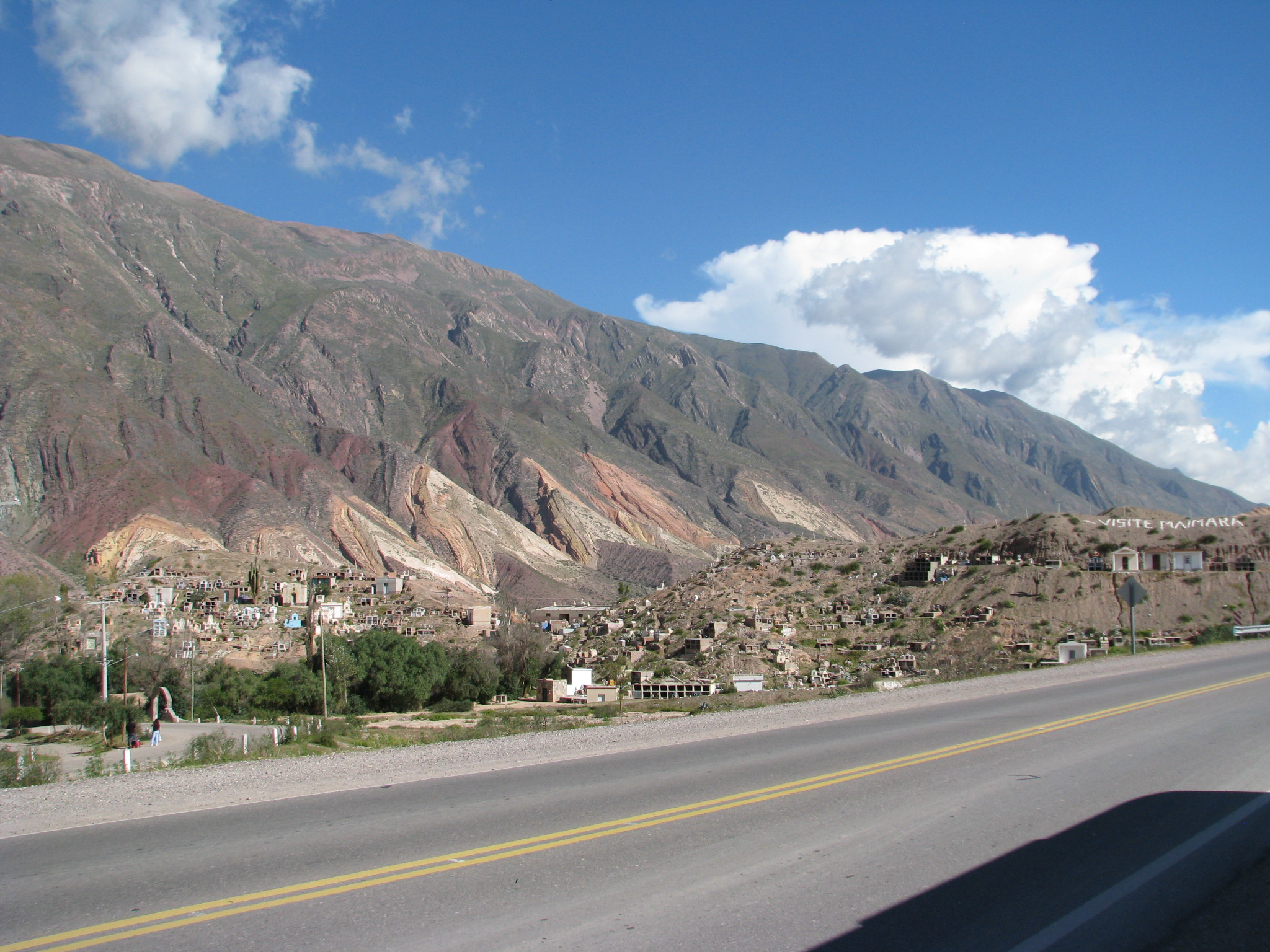
- Interactive map of Maimará
- Country: Argentina
- Province: Jujuy Province
- Time zone: UTC−3 (ART)

Maimará is a town and municipality in Jujuy Province in Argentina.
