= Ford Falcon (Argentina) =

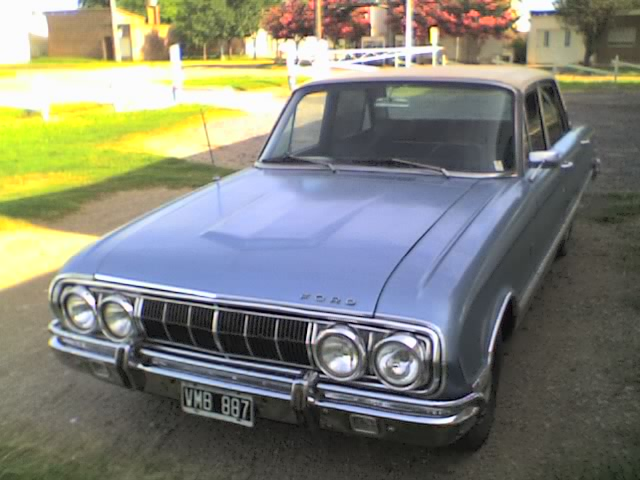
- A 1970 Falcon manufactured in Argentina

Overview
- Manufacturer: Ford Argentina
- Production: 1962–1991; 494,209 produced
- Assembly: Argentina: General Pacheco

Body and chassis
- Class: Family car (D)
- Body style: 4-door sedan 5-door station wagon 2-door coupé utility

Powertrain
- Engine: 2,299 cc Pinto OHC I4 (from 1983); 2,781 cc 170 I6; 3,060 cc 187 I6; 3,075 cc 188 I6; 3,618 cc 221 I6; 2,393 cc VM HR492 diesel I4

Dimensions
- Wheelbase: 2,781 mm (109 in)
- Length: 4,597–4,732 mm (181.0–186.3 in)
- Width: 1,781–1,793 mm (70.1–70.6 in)
- Height: 1,402 mm (55.2 in)
- Curb weight: 1,230–1,406 kg (2,712–3,100 lb)

Chronology
- Successor: Ford Versailles

The Argentine Ford Falcon is a large family car built by Ford Argentina from 1962 to 1991. Mechanically, it was based on the parent company's first generation Falcon. The Falcon retained the same body style throughout its production, with several substantial facelifts taking place during its lifespan, giving it a more European flavor and bringing it into line with other more contemporary Fords. However, several decades later, it was apparent that it was a 1960s design wearing a 1980s grille. Falcons are still raced in the Turismo Carretera stock car racing series.

The robust Ford Falcons became popular as black and yellow taxi cabs and white and blue police vehicles. They also had another connotation, with the dark green painted Falcons used by paramilitary government forces like the Argentine Anticommunist Alliance of the 1970s and the secret police of the military junta. The Ford Falcons used by the military were obtained through illegitimate means by people contracted outside of the military. The Ford Falcons would be repainted and had their license plates replaced in order to deliver the cars to the paramilitary government forces that used the vehicles for their clandestine operations during the Dirty War.

== History ==
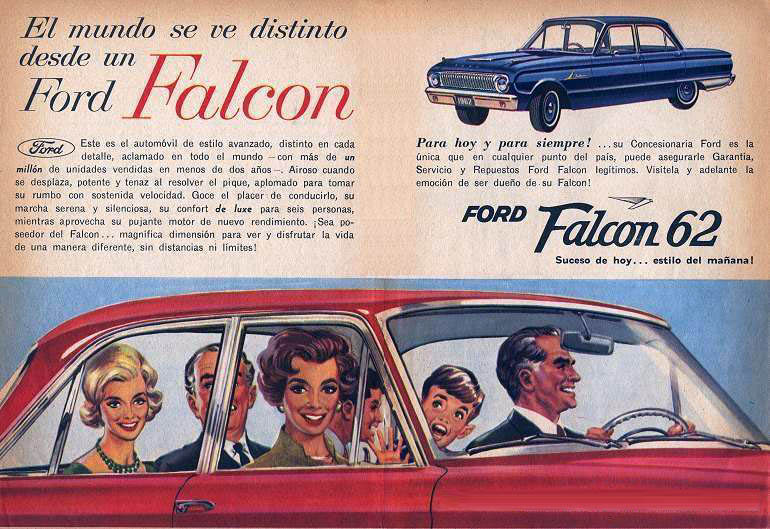
1962 Falcon ad

The story of the Falcon in Argentina began in 1961 when Ford Motor Argentina imported two Falcons from the US to test.

=== 1962 ===
In 1962, local production began with complete knock down kits imported from the US assembled at the Ford factory in La Boca. Only a sedan was offered, with Standard and Deluxe trim levels, and a 170 cubic inch Ford inline-six engine. The official unveiling of the Falcon to the country took place in the theater "Gran Rex" in February 1962.

=== 1963 ===
The first restyle of the Falcon came in 1963 and was produced until 1965. The Falcon now had a horizontal aluminum grille. New models included the Taxi model in 1964, and the more powerful Futura in 1965, with a vinyl roof and bucket seats. The first Futura left the production line on 4 December 1964. A larger and more powerful 187 cu in (3,060 cc) engine was added with the Futura, offering 116 hp (87 kW). More parts were manufactured locally. In 1965, the Falcon became the best seller in the Argentinian market for the first time, reaching an 11.6% share of the market.

=== 1966 ===
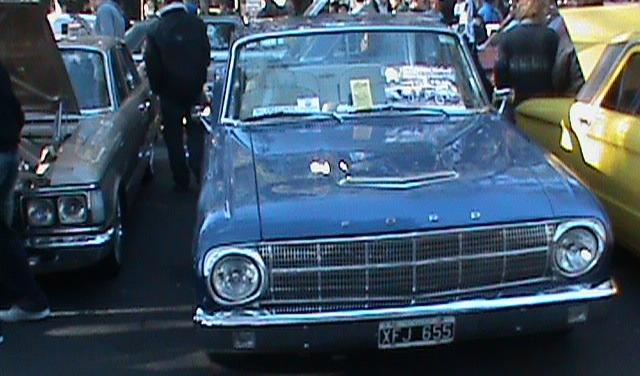
1966-1969 period Ford Falcon

The second restyling of 1966 brought a more ornate grille, hood and side panel ornamentation. Most parts were now locally produced. In late 1967, the new Falcon Rural station wagon model began production, with its own Futura and Deluxe variants. Unlike the North American Falcon wagon, the Argentinian Falcon Rural sat on the same wheelbase as the sedans. High compression engines producing more power were available from 1968, and in 1969 Ford introduced a higher performance 3.6-litre 132 hp engine that became available as an option (model 221XP), it employed a freer-breathing cylinder head and less restrictive exhaust system to boost power. A floor-mounted four-speed transmission became available for the first time.

=== 1970 ===
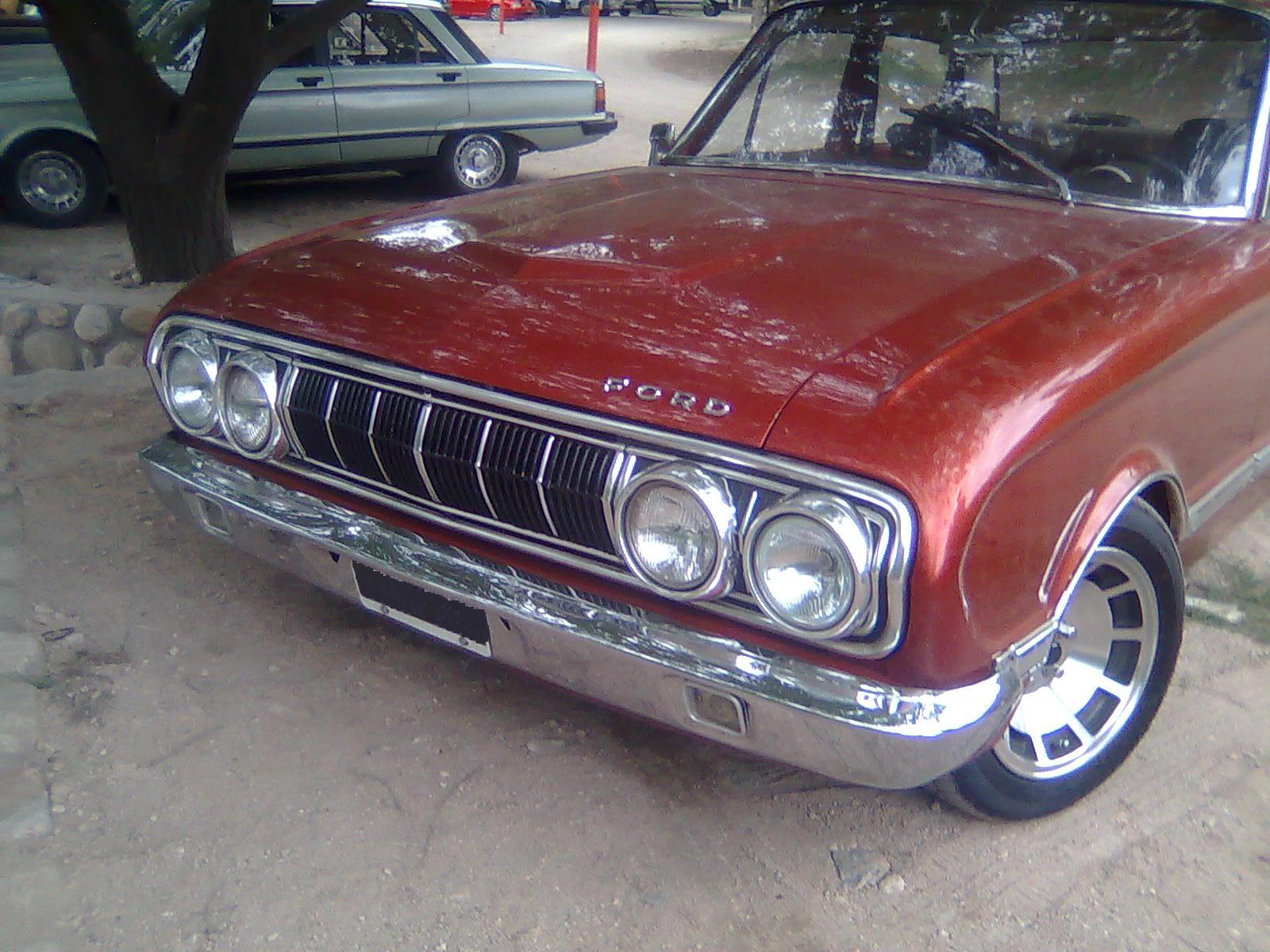
1971 Ford Falcon

The third restyling of 1970 began drifting away from the original design as quad headlights were introduced on Deluxe and Futura models, new front and rear bumpers with vertical nudge bars and disc brakes with 14-inch wheels and low-aspect red-striped radial tyres are now available as options. The 188 and 221 cid engines replaced the earlier 170 and 187. The Futura Rural station wagon was discontinued, instead replaced by the similarly equipped Falcon Rural Deluxe.

=== 1973 ===
By 1973, its fourth restyling, it drifted even more away from the original design, as it got a new redesigned dashboard with round instruments and tachometer on deluxe models, a new grille with several thick horizontal bars and quad headlights become squarer in design. A sporting Falcon Sprint was introduced with new refreshing color schemes, painted stripes, 14-inch sports wheels and E70x14 red-striped Firestone Wide-Tread tires were standard and a higher performance 166 bhp (124.5 kW) specially tuned 3.6-litre engine called the 221-SP; in the interior this model included additional gauges and leather-covered sports steering wheel and leatherette bucket seats of exclusive design. The Deluxe trim of the Rural station wagon was dropped. A pickup, called the Ranchero, was introduced with Standard and Deluxe external trim and a heavy-duty brake option.

=== 1978 ===
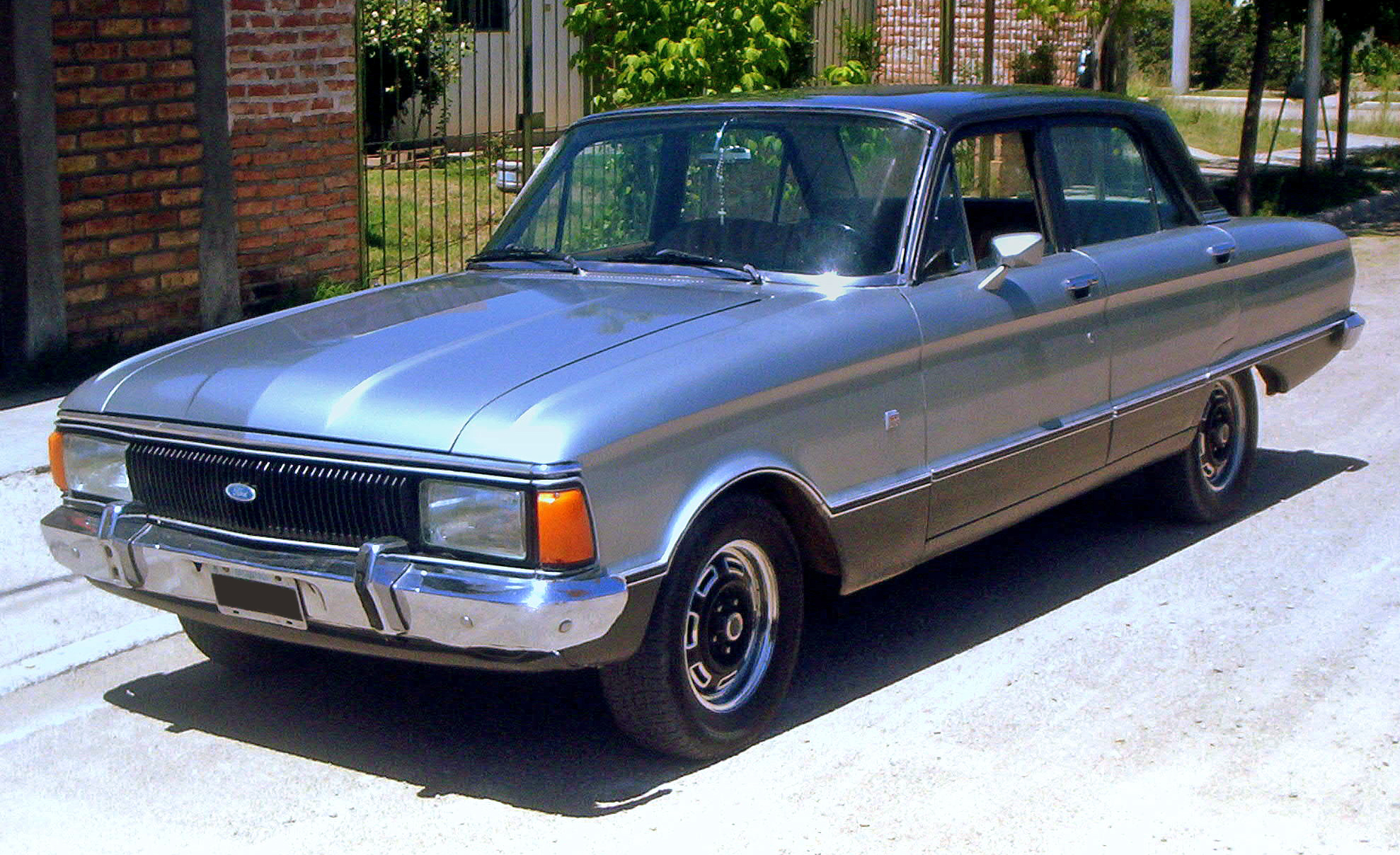
1978 Ford Falcon Sprint

The fifth restyling of 1978 brought further cosmetic changes, with another new grille, this time in plastic, Ford's new oval logo emblems, new updated door handles, improved cabin ventilation with exhaust vents on the C pillar, single large rectangular headlights, and 175/70 R14 radial tyres on sporting or deluxe models, amongst several other changes.

=== 1982 ===
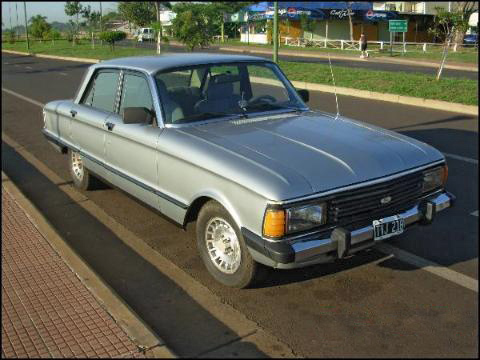
1982 Ford Falcon Ghía

On its sixth and last restyling, Ford tried to bring its design in line, as it was sold along its more modern "siblings", the Ford Taunus, Sierra, and later the Escort. Changes include new bumpers with rubber strips and rubber end caps, new large rectangular taillights with amber turn signals, bronze-tinted glass replaced green, and a larger trunk by reconfiguring the trunk floor and repositioning the spare tyre, and other minor cosmetic changes. The Rural continued to use the original taillights. The Taxi and Sprint versions were dropped, and the Futura was changed into the Ghia. A 2.3-litre four-cylinder petrol engine was available, as was, as of 1988, a rare 2.4-litre diesel. The diesel, a 70 hp (52 kW) Italian-made VM HR492 were produced by Borgward Argentina, but as they proved unable to provide engines at the pace needed by Ford, the project soon came to a halt. Most of the diesels built were Ranchero pickups. The pickup truck, capable of a 715 kg (1,576 lb) max load, continued to be available with the 3.3- and 3.6-litre sixes, as well as the new four.

The 2.3 offered 90 PS (66 kW), while the smaller six has only 84 PS (62 kW), albeit with a higher torque and at a more leisurely engine speed. The unpopular (due to fuel economy worse than that of the 3-litre six) four-cylinder was available only with a four-speed manual, rather than the three-speed manual of the sixes. The four-cylinder was shared with the Argentinian-built Taunus and Sierras. The larger 3.6, the only engine available to the Ghia, has 109 PS (80 kW) except in the high-performance Ghia SP, where 140 PS (103 kW) were on tap due to twin carburettors. Introduced in 1982, there was also a low-compression version of the 3.6 with 103 PS (76 kW). In 1989, the new Max Econo version of the 188 cid/3.1-litre engine became available, with better fuel economy at the cost of performance. Chrome was removed in 1990, and the Falcon was finally discontinued after 1991.

By the end of production, the Falcon had reached about 98 percent local parts integration.

== Production ==
1962-1991 Ford Falcon Production (Sedan and Pickup*)
Year	Production	Year	Production	Year	Production
1962	4,684	1972	25,312	1982	17,296
1963	4,619	1973	35,595	1983	22,060
1964	11,966	1974	25,870	1984	15,075
1965	15,442	1975	11,525	1985	9,405
1966	16,478	1976	8,669	1986	7,691
1967	15,109	1977	16,579	1987	7,839
1968	17,560	1978	20,355	1988	5,272
1969	14,607	1979	28,522	1989	3,232
1970	21,193	1980	34,154	1990	2,177
1971	26,135	1981	19,913	1991	2,462
Total:					466,796

* Note: Not included in above chart are 33,493 station wagons (Falcon Rural) for a total of 494,209 Ford Falcons sold

== See also ==
- Ford Falcon (North America)
- Ford Falcon (Australia)
