= Ángel Lo Valvo =

Argentine racing driver

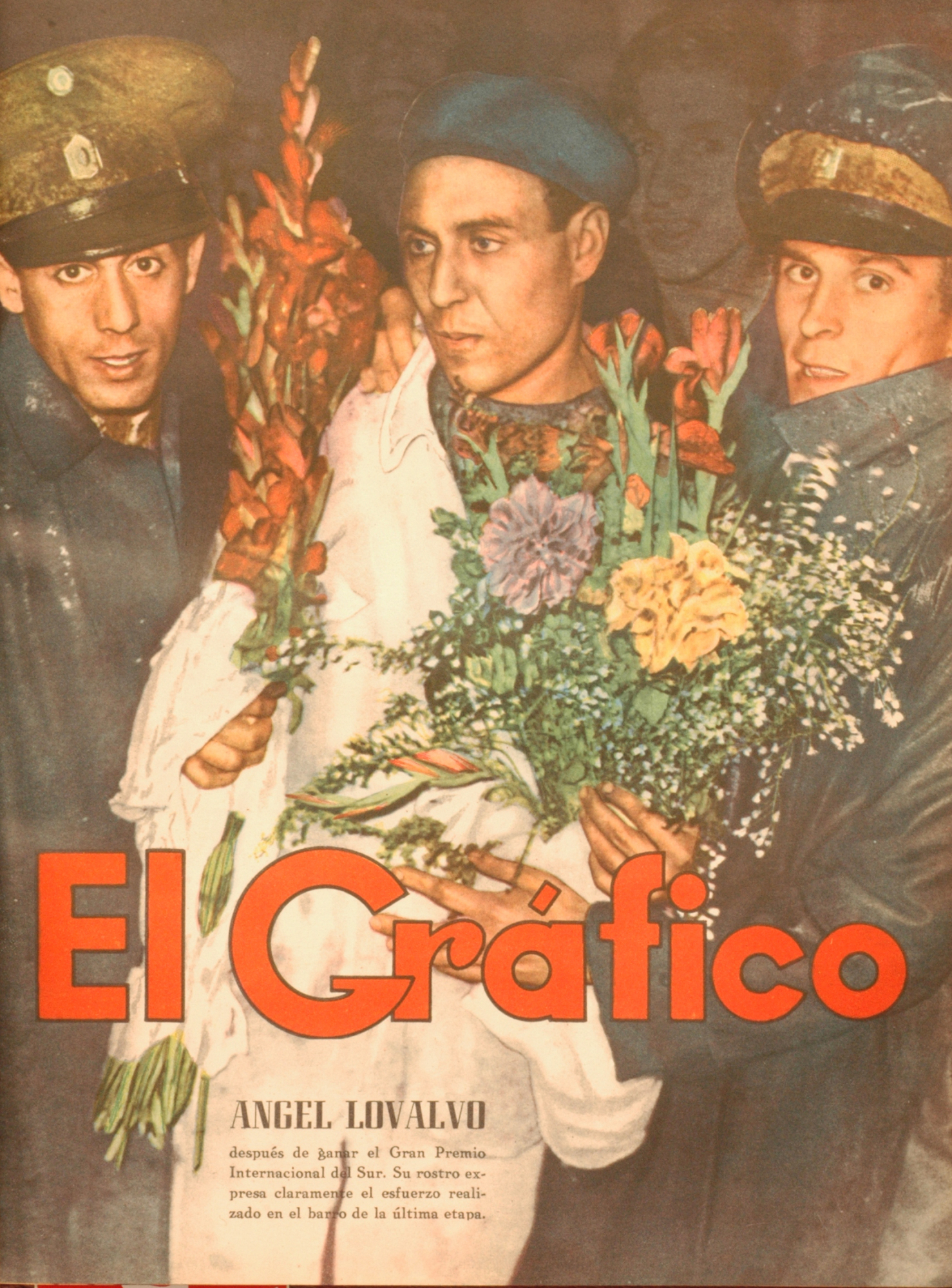
Angel Lo Valvo

Ángel Lo Valvo (August 11, 1909 in Arrecifes, Buenos Aires Province – January 8, 1978) was an Argentine race-car driver who won the first-ever Turismo Carretera competition in 1937. Lo Valvo also won the first Turismo Carretera Championship in 1939.

Lo Valvo entered some races using pseudonym Hipómenes, a Spanish-language term for Greek mythology personage, Hippomenes.

Sporting positions
Preceded by None	Turismo Carretera champion 1939	Succeeded by Juan Manuel Fangio
