= Volkswagen 1500 =

Volkswagen 1500 may refer to one of four automobiles:

- A variant of the Volkswagen Beetle
- A variant of the Volkswagen Type 3
- The Volkswagen 1500 Karmann Ghia
- The rebranded version of Hillman Avenger produced by Volkswagen Argentina between 1982 and 1988.
