= Chrysler Fevre Argentina =

Argentine subsidiary of Chrysler

Chrysler Fevre Argentina S.A.

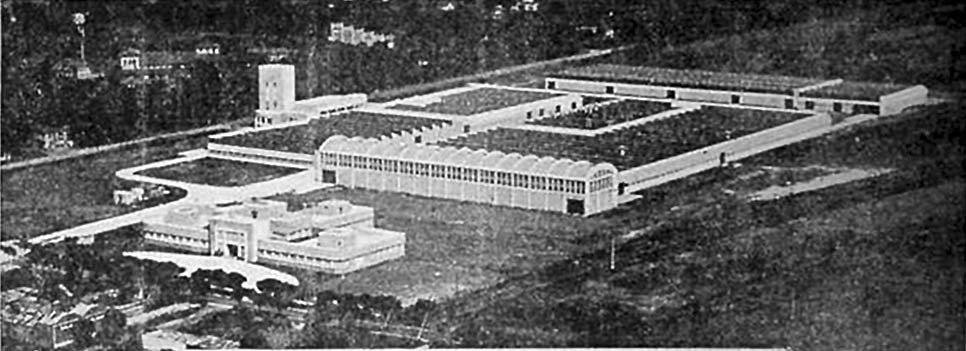
- View of the Chrysler plant in San Justo, Buenos Aires
- Formerly: Julio Fevre y Cía. (1890–1935); Fevre y Basset Ltda. (1935–1959); Fevre y Basset Ltda. S.A.-Chrysler Argentina S.A. (1959–?)
- Type: Subsidiary
- Industry: Automotive
- Founded: 1890
- Founder: Julio Fevre
- Defunct: 1979; 47 years ago
- Successor: Volkswagen Argentina
- Headquarters: San Justo, Buenos Aires, Argentina
- Area served: Argentina
- Products: Automobiles, trucks
- Brands: Chrysler; DeSoto; Dodge; Fargo; Valiant
- Parent: Chrysler Corporation

Chrysler Fevre Argentina S.A. was the Argentina subsidiary of US-based automotive manufacturer Chrysler Corporation. Originally established in 1890 as a supplier for tanning industry, the firm began to commercialise vehicles after an agreement signed with Dodge Brothers Company in 1916, which allowed it to import and commercialise automobiles and trucks in Argentina.

Although the company started its activities only as an importer, it became a manufacturer in the 1960s, producing models based on American and European cars. The company ceased operations in 1979 following the financial crisis of the parent company in the US.

Since 1991, the National University of La Matanza stands on the ground where the Chrysler factory operated until 1979.

== History ==
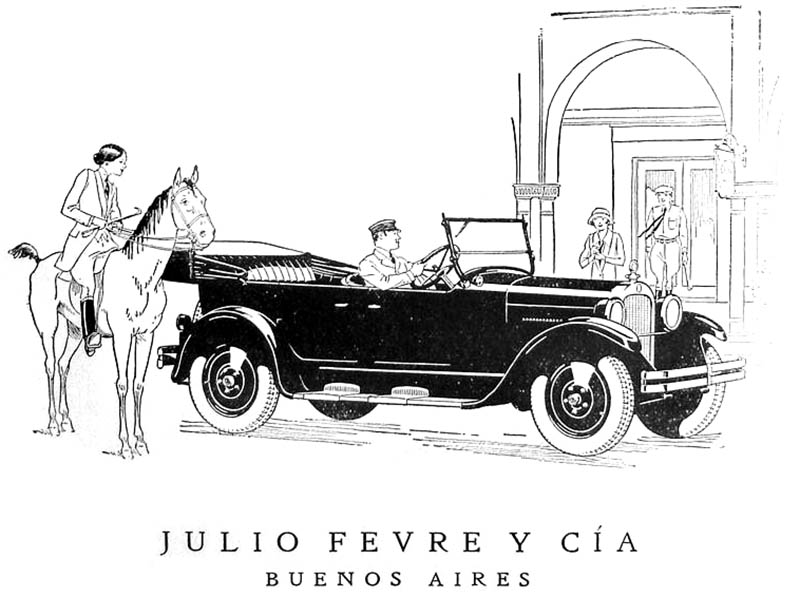
Julio Fevre y Cía. advertisement for the Dodge automobiles

In 1890, Julio Fevre founded "Julio Fevre y Cía." which started operations importing machinery and chemical products for tanning industry. In 1910 Julio took control over the company. Under his direction, the company changed direction and entered to the vehicle market importing automobiles of French marques Mors, Delaugère et Clayette, Aries, Delage, Delahaye, Citroën, and Berliet. In 1914 driver Diego Basset participated in racing competitions with the Mors cars imported by Fevre. Years later, Julio Fevre himself (and then his son Pablo) also competed with Mors cars.

In 1916, Fevre travelled to the US to get exclusive rights to the "Dodge Brothers" vehicles that allowed him to commercialise those vehicles in Argentina. In 1922, Fevre constructed a building on Leandro N. Alem avenue in Buenos Aires that became the company's head offices. Following to the inception of Chrysler Corporation in the US in 1925, Argentine "Resta Hermanos" became official representative of its products in Argentina two years later. Chrysler took over Dodge, Fargo, and Plymouth in 1928.

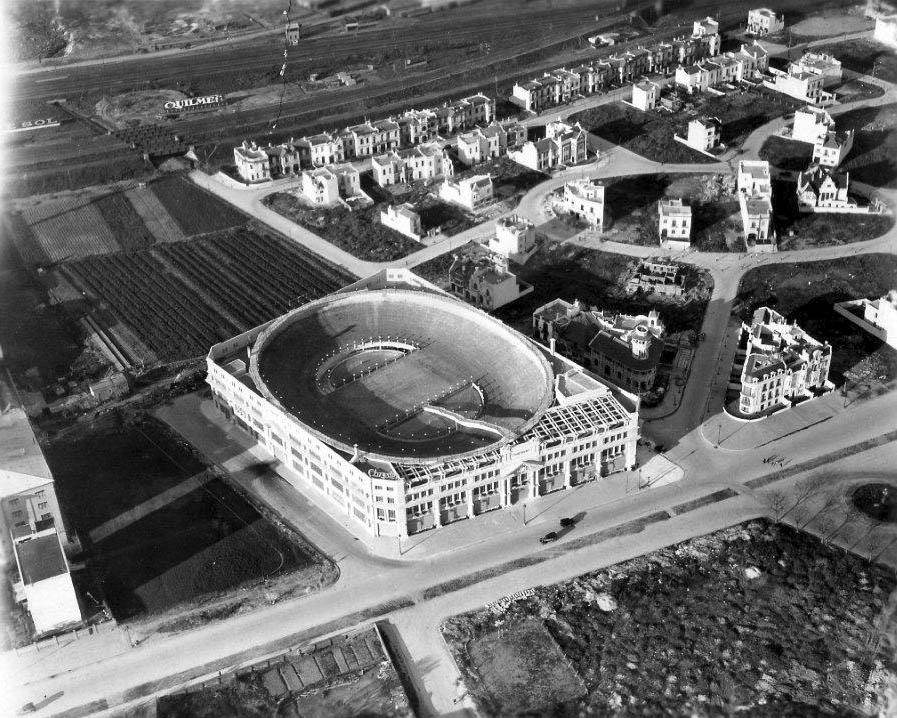
Aerial view of the "Palacio Alcorta", former headquarters of the company in Palermo, Buenos Aires

In 1932, automobiles and buses started to be assembled at the building on Avenida Figueroa Alcorta 3300 (then known as "Palacio Chrysler"). Three years later, the official name changed to "Fevre y Basset Ltda. S.A.I.C." (a society between Julio Fevre and Diego Basset). Fevre y Basset bought Resta Hermanos in 1931, becoming Chrysler representatives in Argentina. In 1940, the building on L.N. Alem was vacated and all operations moved to Palacio Chrysler.

When the World War II came to an end, Fevre y Basset Ltda. S.A.I.C. acquired a 38-ha land in the San Justo district of La Matanza Partido to build an industrial plant there. Works began in 1948 and the factory was ready to use in 1950. The plant ..... 50,000 m2, became the largest after US and Canada plants. All machinery and assets in Palacio Chrysler were moved to San Justo and the building then sold to the National Government.

In early 1959 Fevre y Basset Ltd signed an agreement with Chrysler International, establishing "Chrysler Argentina S.A.". Despite being a society, the companies continued operating as separated entities so Luis Fevre continued as president of Fevre y Basset Ltda., while George Topping was in charge of Chrysler Argentina. The agreement stated that Chrysler Argentina took over production process while Fevre y Basset Ltda. took over assembling and commercialisation. Due to restrictions over imported products, the factory was inactive until late 1959.

=== Production ===
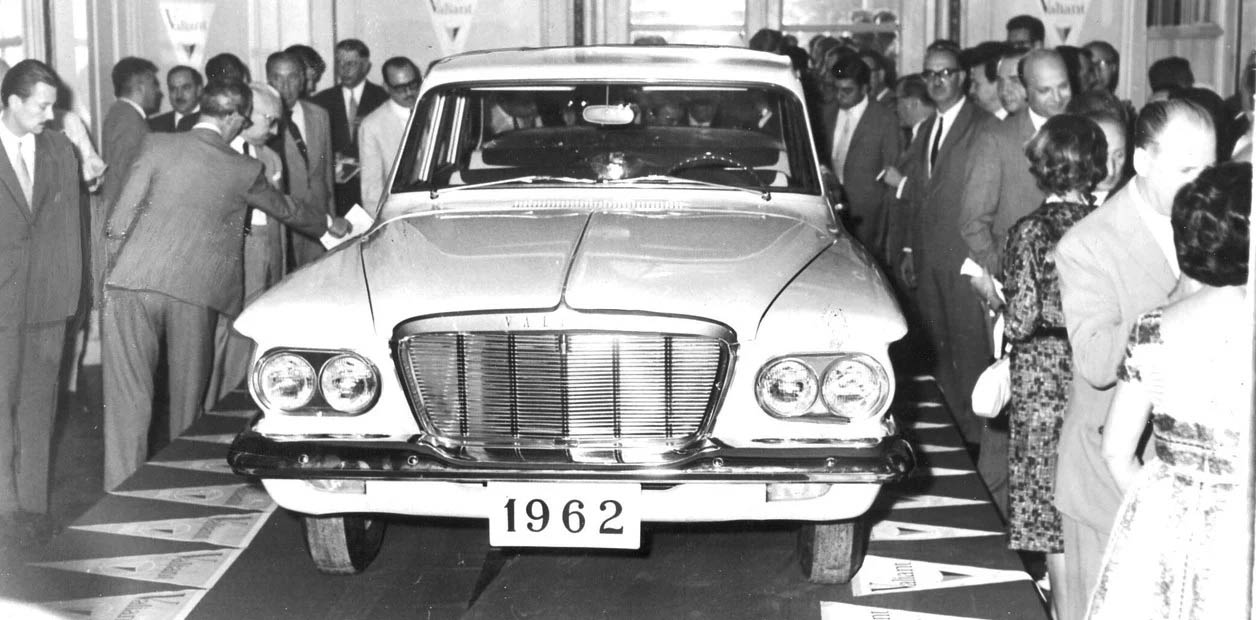
The Valiant V200 was the first automobile manufactured by Chrysler Fevre. It was introduced at Alvear Palace Hotel in December 1961

The plant was officially inaugurated on May 3, 1960, and the first D-100 pick ups and D-400 trucks began to be manufactured under the Dodge, Fargo, and DeSoto brands. In April 1961 the factory began production of 125 HP engines for trucks and then, propulsion transmission. Trucks branded Fargo and DeSoto lasted until 1967, leaving only the 'Dodge' name since then.

In December 1961 the first automobile by Chrysler Argentina S.A., Valiant V200, began to be produced although it was not on sale until 1962. This compact car model was intended to compete with the Ford Falcon and Chevrolet 400. Transmissions and engines were imported during that first year of production. In 1963, the Slant Six engine and the 3-speed gear sticks were added to local production. That same year, the "Valiant II" (with the same body style but equipped with a 3687cc (3.7 liter) 137 HP Slant Six engine) was launched.

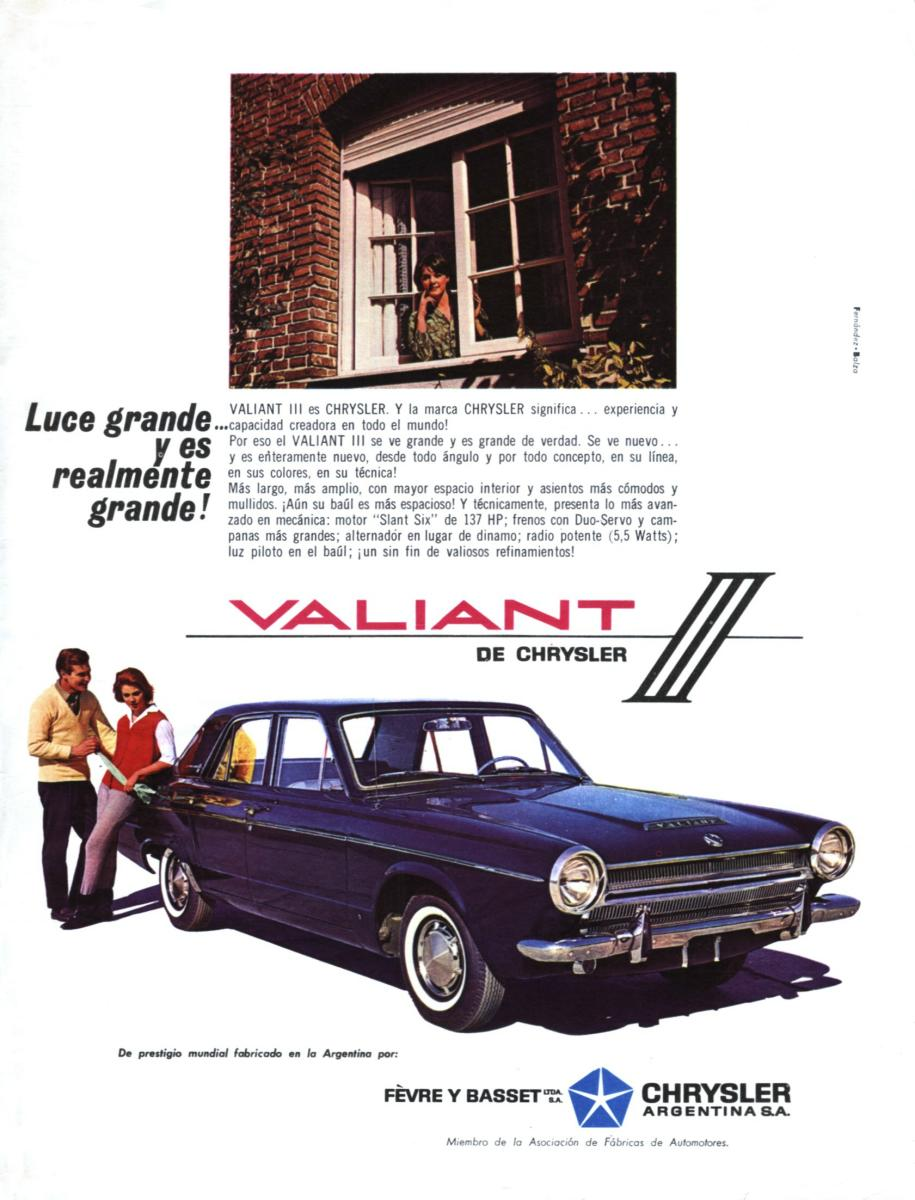
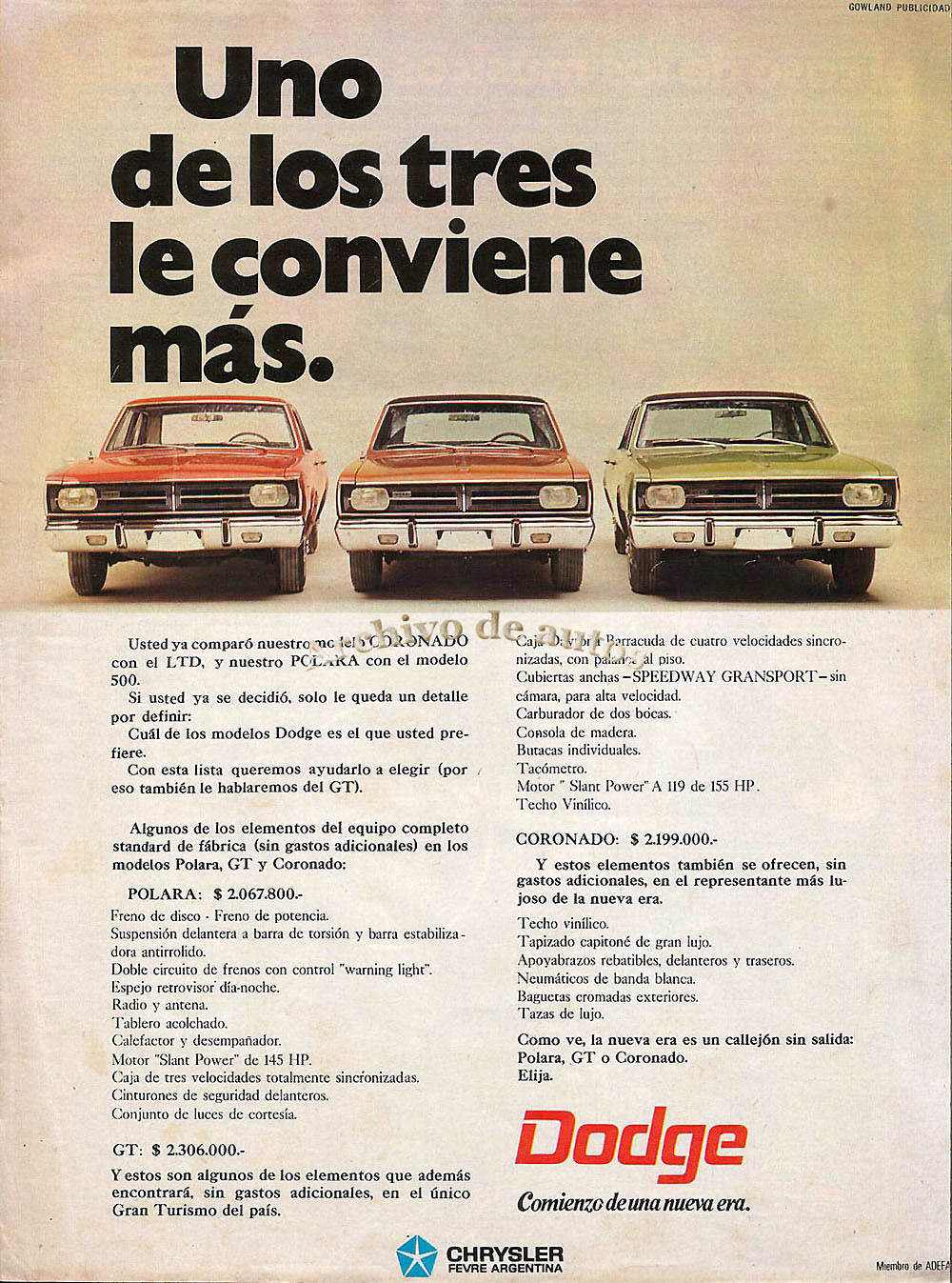
1964 Advertisement for the Valiant III featuring a new body style (left) and Dodge models (named Polara) in 1969 (right)

In 1964 the "Valiant III" replaced model II. It was based on the Dodge Dart, recently released in the US. With 4976mm length, it became the largest car in Argentina, surpassing Rambler. One year later, both companies Chrysler International S.A. and Fevre y Basset Ltda. S.A.I.C. merged, with the new company being named "Chrysler Fevre Argentina S.A.I.C.". By those times, the plant had been expanded to 65,000 m2. Between 1962 and 1964, 27,000 transmissions were produced in the plant. The Valiant IV (based on the Dodge Dart as its predecessor) was launched in 1966 as an update of its previous versions.

In 1968, the "Valiant" line was replaced by Dodge Polara, while all the utility vehicles were rebranded as "Dodge". In 1970, Chrysler Fevre bought the former Siam Di Tella plant in Monte Chingolo, Buenos Aires. That plant was used to produce trucks.

Launched in 1971, the Dodge 1500 (based on the Hillman Avenger produced by British firm Rootes Group, also a subsidiary of Chrysler) became the first mid-size car to be produced by an American firm in Argentina. That was also the first non-US automobile marketed by Chrysler in Argentina. The success of the 1500 helped the company to increase its sells in the country. The car had also a station wagon version launched in 1978.

Despite the good sales of its products in Argentina, Chrysler ceased operations in the country because of the financial crisis that the parent company was going through in the US. Chrysler not only left Argentina but all Latin America (Brazil, Colombia, Venezuela, and Perú) and Europe after a direct order from Chrysler Corporation in Detroit.

On May 5, 1980, Chrysler Fevre sold its business in Argentina and Brazil to Volkswagen, which established local subsidiaries in Argentina and Brazil.

== Vehicles produced ==
List of vehicles (automobiles and trucks) produced by Chrysler Fevre in Argentina:

Local marque and model	Origin	Original model	Produced	Image
Dodge / Fargo / DeSoto; D-400 (Note: Similar vehicles with different brand names. Fargo and DeSoto brands were discontinued in Argentina in 1967.)	USA	Dodge D truck	1960–80	
Dodge / Fargo / DeSoto; D-100	USA	Dodge D pick up	1960–79	
Valiant I–II	USA	1961 Plymouth Valiant	1961–63	
Valiant III	USA	1964 Dodge Dart	1964–66	
Valiant IV	USA	1966 Dodge Dart	1966–68	
Dodge Polara	USA	1967–69 Dodge Dart	1969–80	
Dodge 1500	UK	Rootes Hillman Avenger	1971–80 (Note: After Chrysler closed its Argentine subsidiary, production of the model was resumed by recently formed "Volkswagen Argentina", which rebranded it as "Volkswagen 1500", producing it until 1990.)	

== Aftermath ==
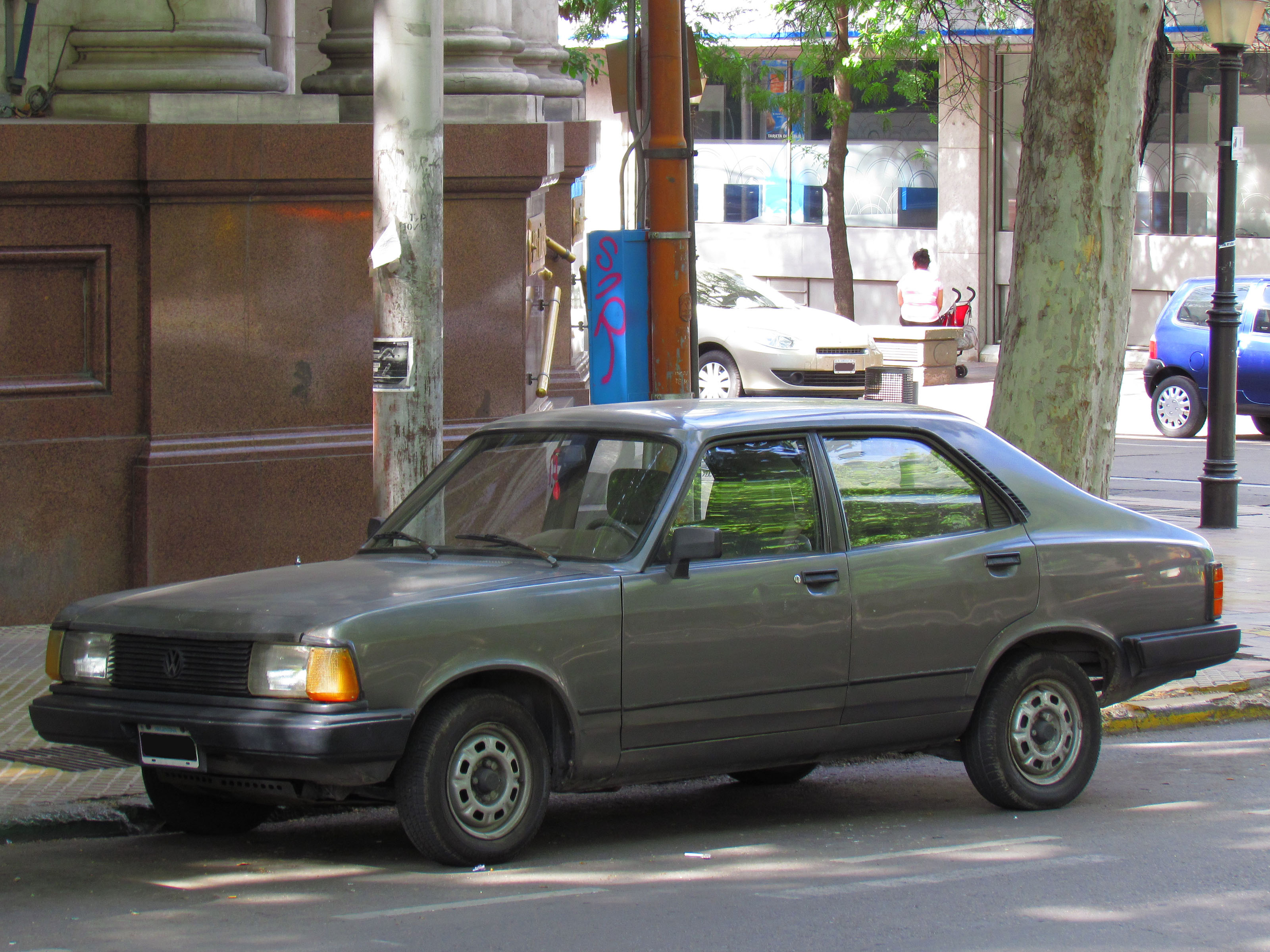
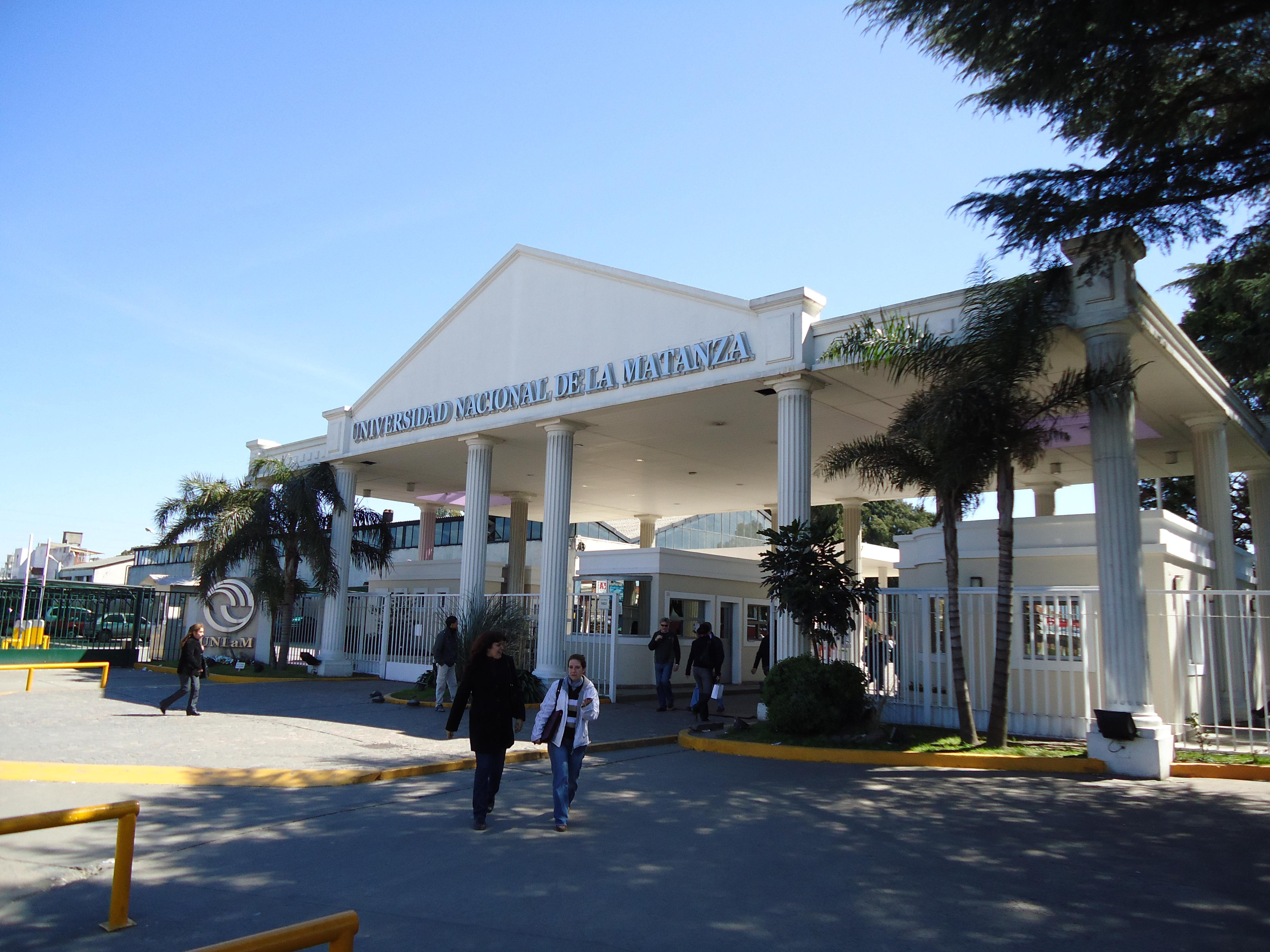
(Left): After Chrysler left Argentina, Volkswagen resumed production of the 1500 model with minor changes; (right): National University of La Matanza was built on the former Chrysler Fevre factory

When Chrysler ceased operations in Argentina and Latin America, the company sold its local subsidiary to Volkswagen, which established Volkswagen Argentina and Volkswagen Brazil to resume production of Dodge 1500, now branded as "Volkswagen Dodge 1500W". Although the 1500 quickly ceased production in Brazil, in Argentina it continued being manufactured by Volkswagen.

When the company took over complete control in 1982, the car was rebranded as "Volkswagen 1500". The VW 1500 was produced in Argentina until 1990, when it was discontinued. Since its inception in 1971, a total of 262,668 Dodge/VW 1500 were produced.

The former Chrysler plant in San Justo was vacated and remained abandoned for many years until in 1989 the Senate of Argentina promulgated Law 23,748 that created the National University of La Matanza. The main building of the plant was refurbished and was reinaugurated in 1991 as the UNLaM seat.
