= Volkswagen Amarok =

Pickup truck

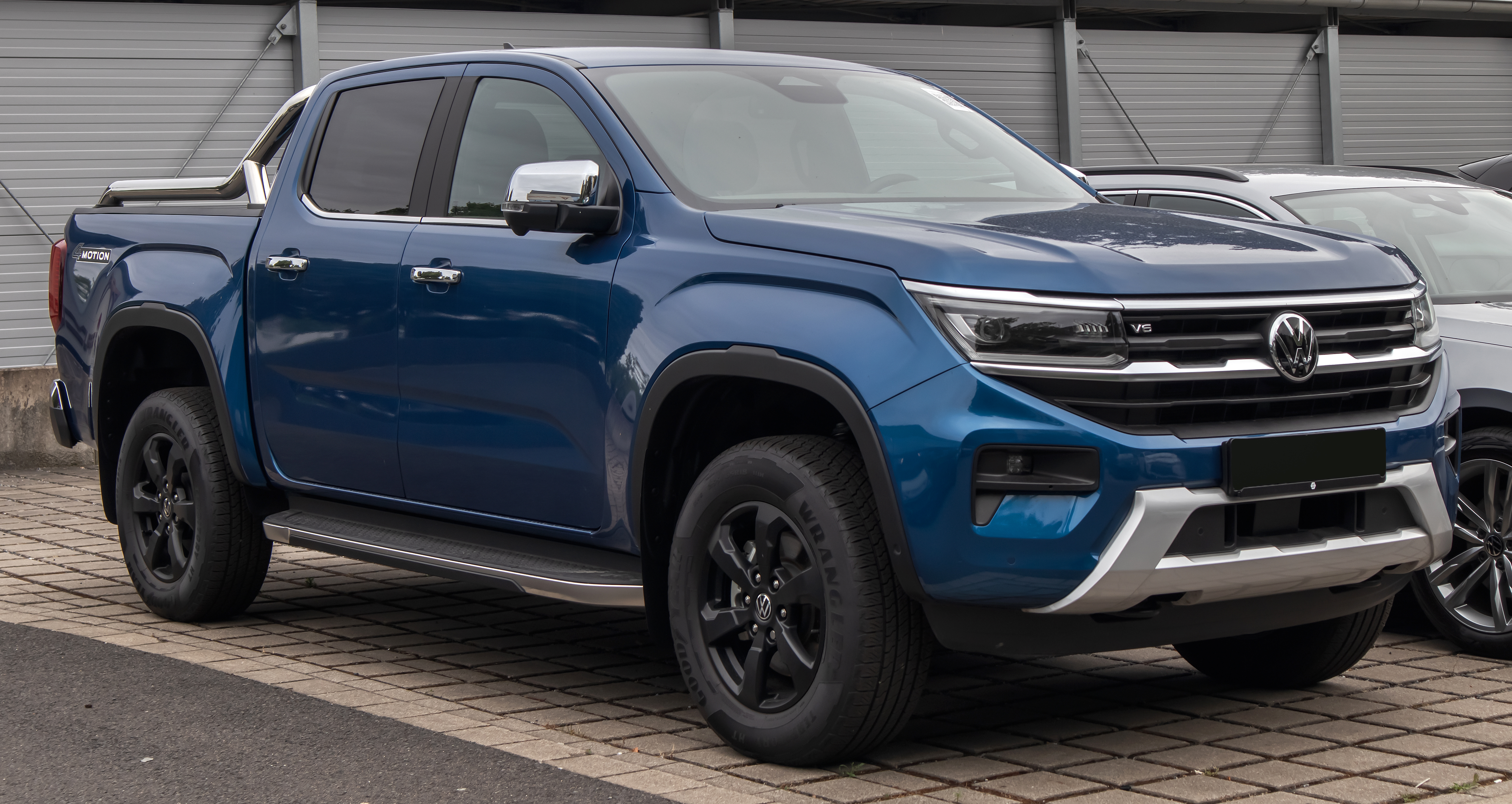
- Second generation Amarok

Overview
- Manufacturer: Volkswagen Commercial Vehicles
- Production: 2010–present

Body and chassis
- Class: Mid-size pickup truck
- Body style: 2-door single cab 4-door double cab
- Layout: Front-engine, rear-wheel-drive or four-wheel-drive (4motion)

Chronology
- Predecessor: Volkswagen Taro; Volkswagen Caddy pickup

The Volkswagen Amarok is a mid-size pickup truck produced by German automaker Volkswagen since 2010. It is a body-on-frame truck with double-wishbone suspension at the front and leaf springs at the rear. The Amarok range consists of single cab and double cab, combined with either rear-wheel drive or 4motion four-wheel-drive, and is powered by turbocharged petrol or turbocharged direct injection (TDI) diesel engines.

Amarok competes in some global markets with comparable mid-size pickup trucks, such as the Toyota Hilux, Nissan Navara, Mitsubishi L200, Ford Ranger, Isuzu D-Max and Chevrolet/Holden Colorado/S-10. The second-generation Amarok is based on the Ford Ranger.

Between 2010 and 2022, 830,000 units of the first-generation Amarok have been sold.

The name Amarok, referencing a wolf deity in Inuit mythology, was chosen by brand marketing consultants Interbrand; Interbrand also claims the name is associated with the phrase "he loves stones" in Romanic languages in an attempt to allude to the all-terrain performance of the vehicle.

== First generation (2H; 2010) ==
First generation
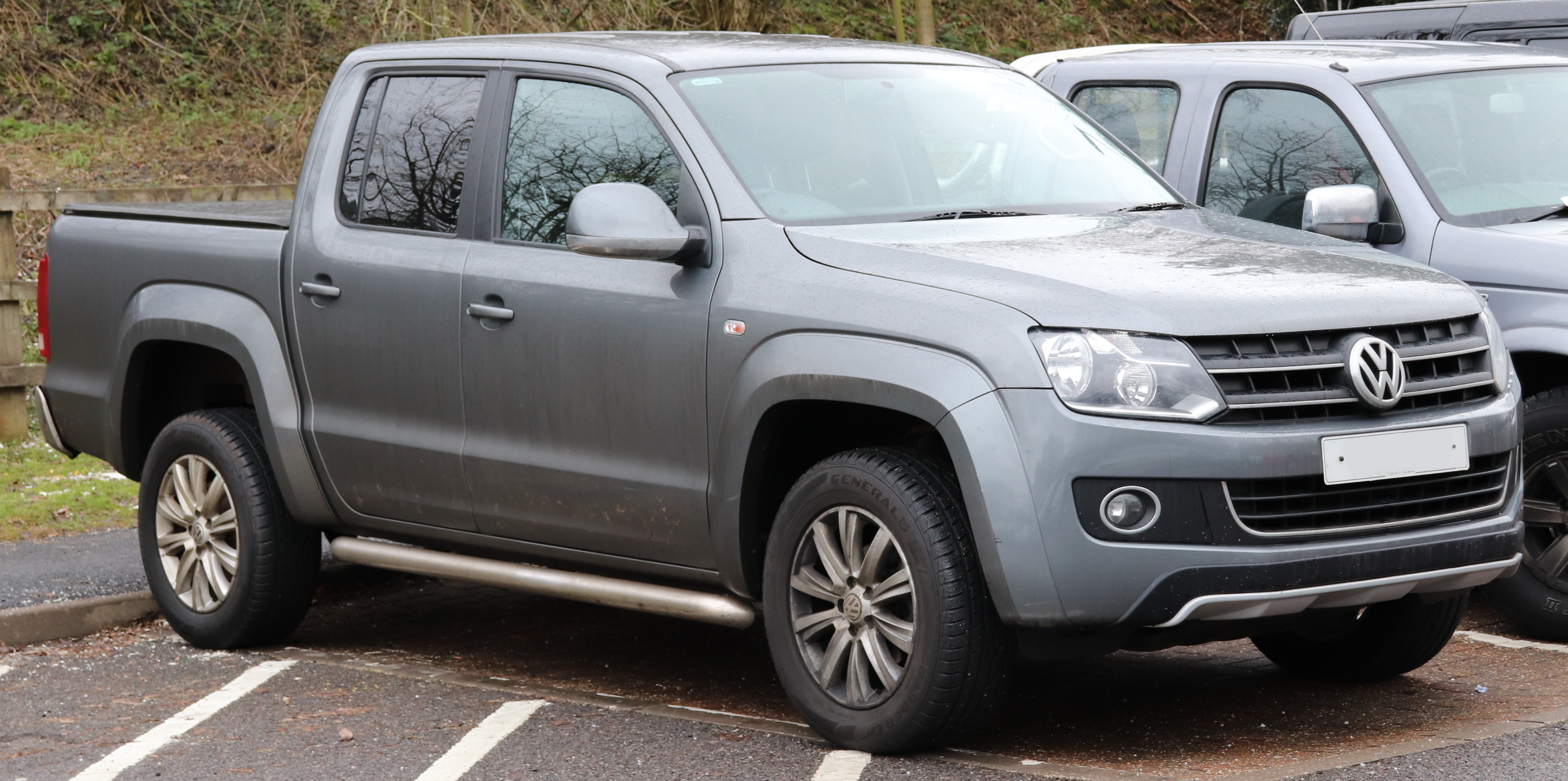

Overview
- Model code: Typ 2F
- Production: 2010–present (Argentina); 2010–2020 (Europe)
- Assembly: Argentina: General Pacheco (Volkswagen Argentina); Germany: Hannover Algeria: Relizane (SOVAC); Ecuador: Quito (Aymesa)
- Designer: Walter de Silva (2010 design); Juan Carlos Pavone (2024 redesign)

Powertrain
- Engine: 2.0 L I4 TSI (petrol); 2.0 L I4 TDI CR 03L (diesel); 2.0 L I4 BiTDI CR (diesel); 3.0 L V6 TDI CR (diesel)
- Transmission: 6-speed manual 8-speed ZF 8HP automatic

Dimensions
- Wheelbase: 3,090–3,095 mm (121.7–121.9 in)
- Length: 5,181–5,254 mm (204.0–206.9 in) (Single, Double Cab); 5,900 mm (232.3 in) (Extended Bed); 5,350 mm (210.6 in) (Double Cab, second facelift)
- Width: 1,944–2,019 mm (76.5–79.5 in)
- Height: 1,820–1,878 mm (71.7–73.9 in) (Single, Double Cab)
- Kerb weight: 1,872–2,324 kg (4,127–5,124 lb)

The Amarok, the first pickup from Volkswagen Commercial Vehicles, was presented to the general public in General Pacheco, Argentina, on 7 January 2010. The project dates back from 2005, when Volkswagen Commercial Vehicles announced their intent to build a robust pickup and off-road family of vehicles. It was teased as the Robust Pick-Up concept in September 2008, wrapped in a search and rescue (SAR) vehicle colour scheme; the design was said to be 95 percent resembling the production version.

Following the launch in Argentina, the Amarok was a key support vehicle in the 2010 Dakar Rally, with 45 having been used.

The Amarok is currently being produced in the Volkswagen Group plant in General Pacheco, Argentina; for South American, Mexican, Oceanian, South African, Russian, and European markets. It is expected to produce 90,000 Amaroks annually once production is at full capacity. As of 2022, 70% of the Argentine Amaroks are exported.

The Hanover site was originally dropped from possible sites to produce the Amarok due to the 2008 financial crisis and increasing economic costs in Europe in 2009. In September 2010, it was decided that 40,000 Amarok pickups will also be produced annually in Hanover, Germany for the European and small volume markets from mid-2012.

The 100,000th Amarok was produced on 8 October 2011.

In Argentina the first-generation Amarok is to be replaced by a model based on the Maxus Terron 9.

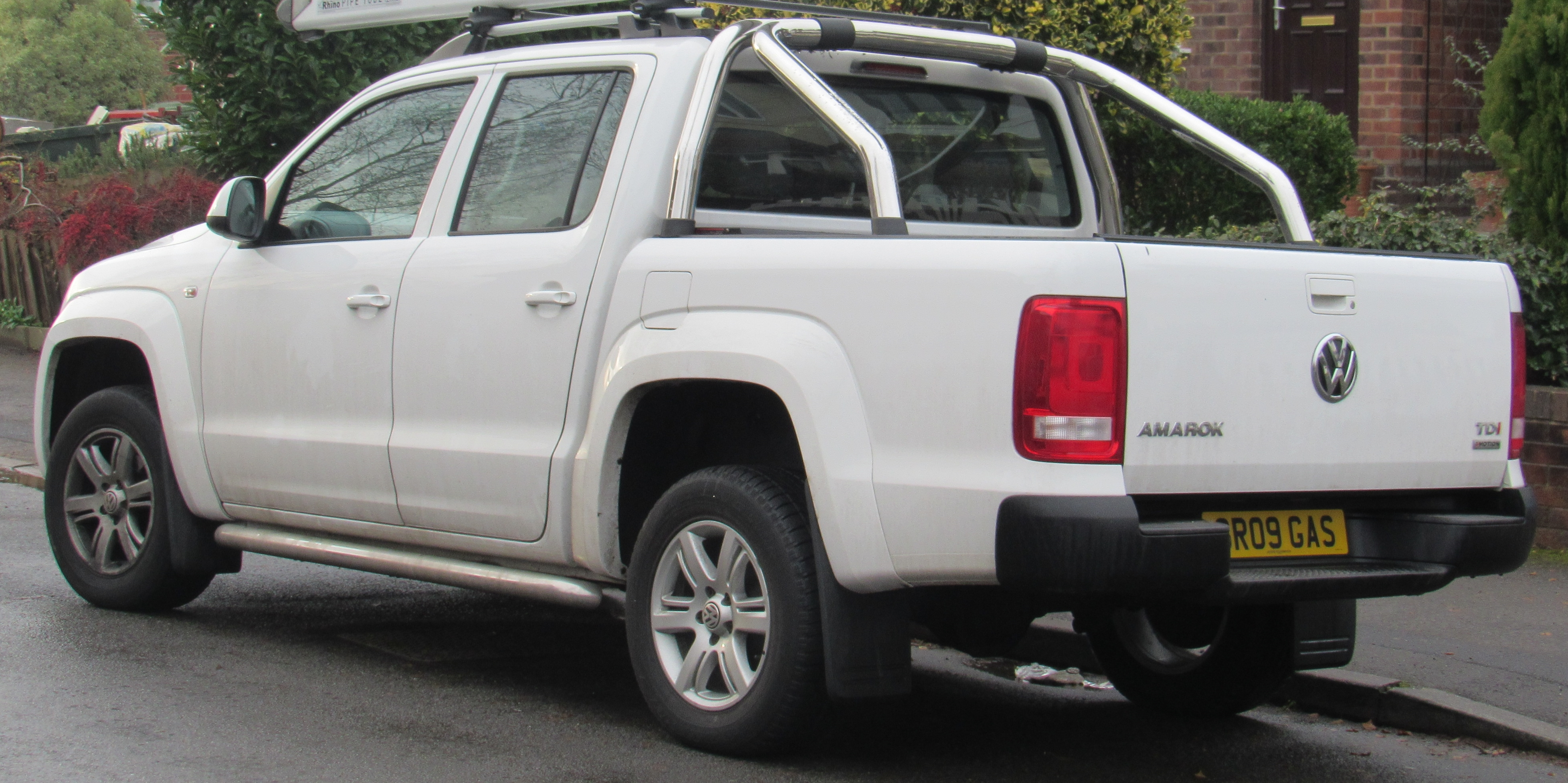
Rear view (double cab)

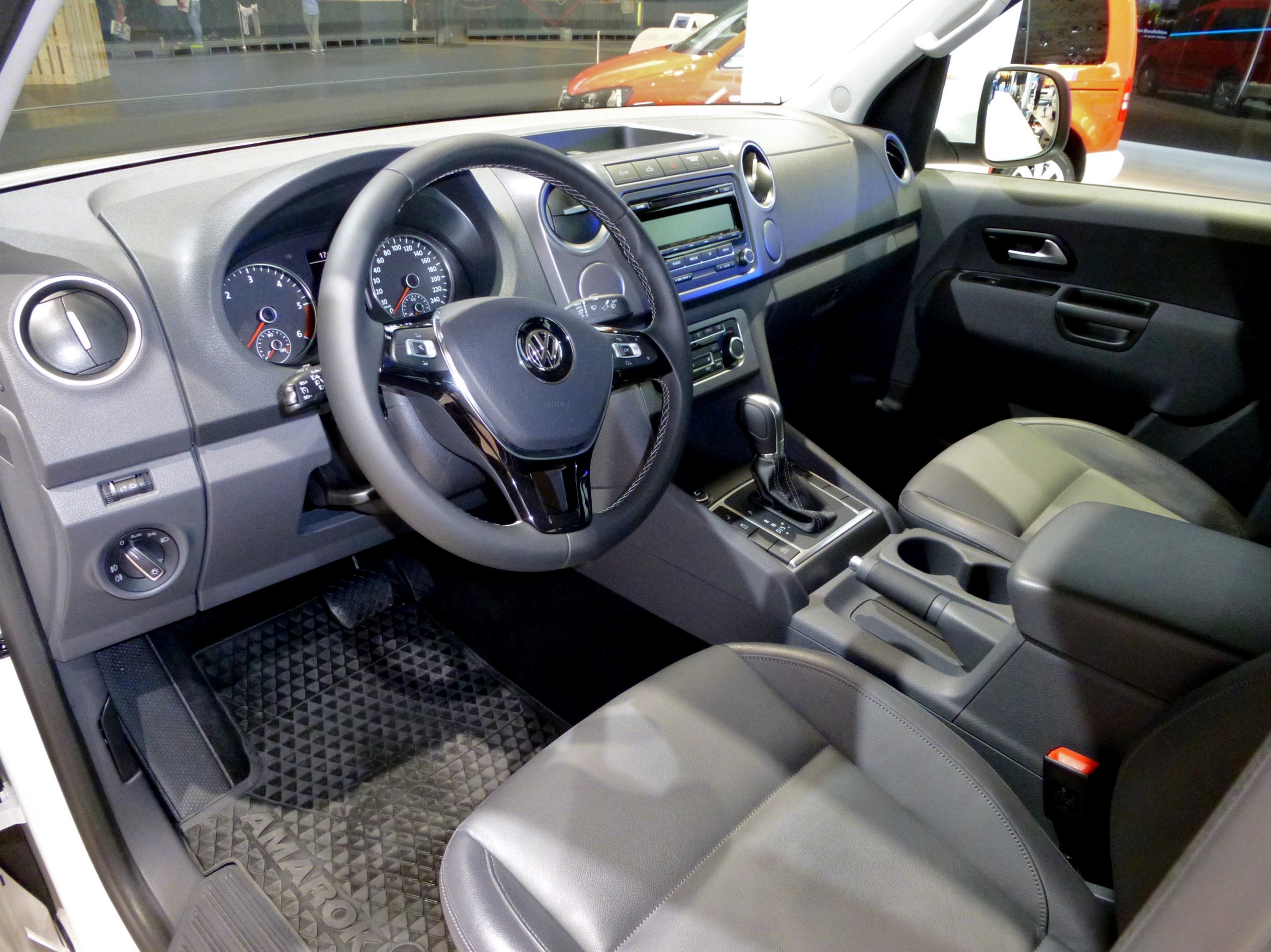
Interior

=== Powertrain ===
The Amarok is powered by a range of turbocharged direct injection (TDI) common rail diesel engines, and fuel stratified injection (FSI) petrol engine.

As of 2010, the engine range consists of two 2.0L turbocharged direct injection (TDI) common rail diesel engines which is taken from the Volkswagen Transporter (T5), it has been tuned for more torque but less power; the entry-level version produces 90 kW (122 PS; 121 hp) which develops a maximum torque of 340 N⋅m (250 lb⋅ft) from 2,000 rpm. The top-of-the-line bi-turbo version produces 120 kW (163 PS; 161 hp) which develops a maximum torque of 400 N⋅m (300 lb⋅ft) from 1500 rpm −2500 rpm. Fuel consumption in a combined cycle format is as low as 7.6 L/100 km (37 mpg_{‑imp}; 31 mpg_{‑US}) on the rear-wheel-drive variant to 8.1 L/100 km (35 mpg_{‑imp}; 29 mpg_{‑US}) on the 4Motion version, which theoretically gives the Amarok a 1,000 km (620 mi) range before filling up for fuel.

As of the 2012 Model Year, Volkswagen has introduced two more engine configurations, 2.0L TDI 90 kW motor upgraded to 103 kW of power and a 2.0L Bi-TDI which has an optional 8-speed ZF engineered automatic transmission.

On 22 September 2014, Volkswagen launched a limited edition Amarok Dark Label model. The Dark Label model is fitted with the 178 bhp (180 PS; 133 kW) 2.0-litre BiTDI engine, generating up to 420 N⋅m (310 lb⋅ft) of torque and offering a maximum towing capacity of up to 3,200 kg (7,100 lb).

For the 2017 model year, Volkswagen announced a facelifted Amarok range. The key feature of the facelift is a new engine that replaces the earlier models' 2.0L TDI engine. In place of the previous four-cylinder engine, the Amarok is now fitted with a version of VW's 3.0L TDI V6. It will be available in three states of tune (121 kW (162 hp), 150 kW (201 hp), and 167 kW (224 hp)), with the most powerful version boasting a torque output of 406 lb⋅ft (550 N⋅m) and a 0–62 mph (100 km/h) time of 8 seconds. In the UK the lowest power output was dropped in favour of the 201 and 254 BHP models, the latter has an overboost to 268 and can hit 62 from a standstill in 7.4 seconds.

The new V6 TDI offers up to 23% more power and 28% more torque while delivering lower emissions and decreased fuel consumption compared to the previous 2.0 BiTDI engine that was previously the most powerful option. Deliveries of the new Amarok V6 TDI were scheduled to commence in the 3rd quarter of 2016. In late 2018 a more powerful version of the 3.0 V6 TDI was produced (190/200 kW & 580 Nm) to compete with the new Mercedes Benz X Class V6 CDI.

Model	Years	Engine	Displ.	Power	Torque
2.0 TSI	2011–	I4 16V	1,984 cc (121.1 cu in)	121 kW (165 PS; 162 hp) @ 3800–5500 rpm	300 N⋅m (221 lb⋅ft) @ 1600–3750 rpm
2.0 TDI (CR) DPF	2010–2011	I4 16V	1,968 cc (120.1 cu in)	90 kW (122 PS; 121 hp) @ 3750 rpm	340 N⋅m (251 lb⋅ft) @ 1750–2250 rpm
2.0 TDI (CR) DPF	2012–	I4 16V	1,968 cc (120.1 cu in)	103 kW (140 PS; 138 hp) @ 3750 rpm	340 N⋅m (251 lb⋅ft) @ 1750–2250 rpm
2.0 BiTDI (CR) DPF	2010–	I4 16V	1,968 cc (120.1 cu in)	121 kW (165 PS; 162 hp) @ 4000 rpm	400 N⋅m (295 lb⋅ft) @ 1500–2000 rpm
2.0 BiTDI (CR) DPF	2012–	I4 16V	1,968 cc (120.1 cu in)	132 kW (179 PS; 177 hp)	420 N⋅m (310 lb⋅ft) @ 1500–2000 rpm
3.0 TDI (CR) Bluemotion SCR, DPF	2016–	V6 24V	2,967 cc (181.1 cu in)	121–165 kW (165–224 PS; 162–221 hp)	550 N⋅m (406 lb⋅ft) @ 1400–3000 rpm
3.0 TDI (CR) Bluemotion SCR, DPF	2019–	V6 24V	2,967 cc (181.1 cu in)	190–200 kW (258–272 PS; 255–268 hp)	580 N⋅m (428 lb⋅ft) @ 1400–3000 rpm
3.0 TDI (CR) Bluemotion SCR, DPF (Manual)	2020–	V6 24V	2,967 cc (181.1 cu in)	165 kW (224 PS; 221 hp)	500 N⋅m (369 lb⋅ft) @ 1400–3000 rpm

=== Facelifts ===
==== First facelift (2016) ====
In 2016, the Amarok went through a facelift for the 2016 model year. The facelift included a new revamped interior, which matches closely to the Volkswagen Transporter (T6), slight upgrade in equipment, new headlights and front grille, but the most notable difference is the introduction of the then-new 3.0 V6 TDi engine. In 2019, a more powerful 580 N-m variant of the V6 engine was introduced, with the original 550 N-m variant still being sold for the lower-spec models.

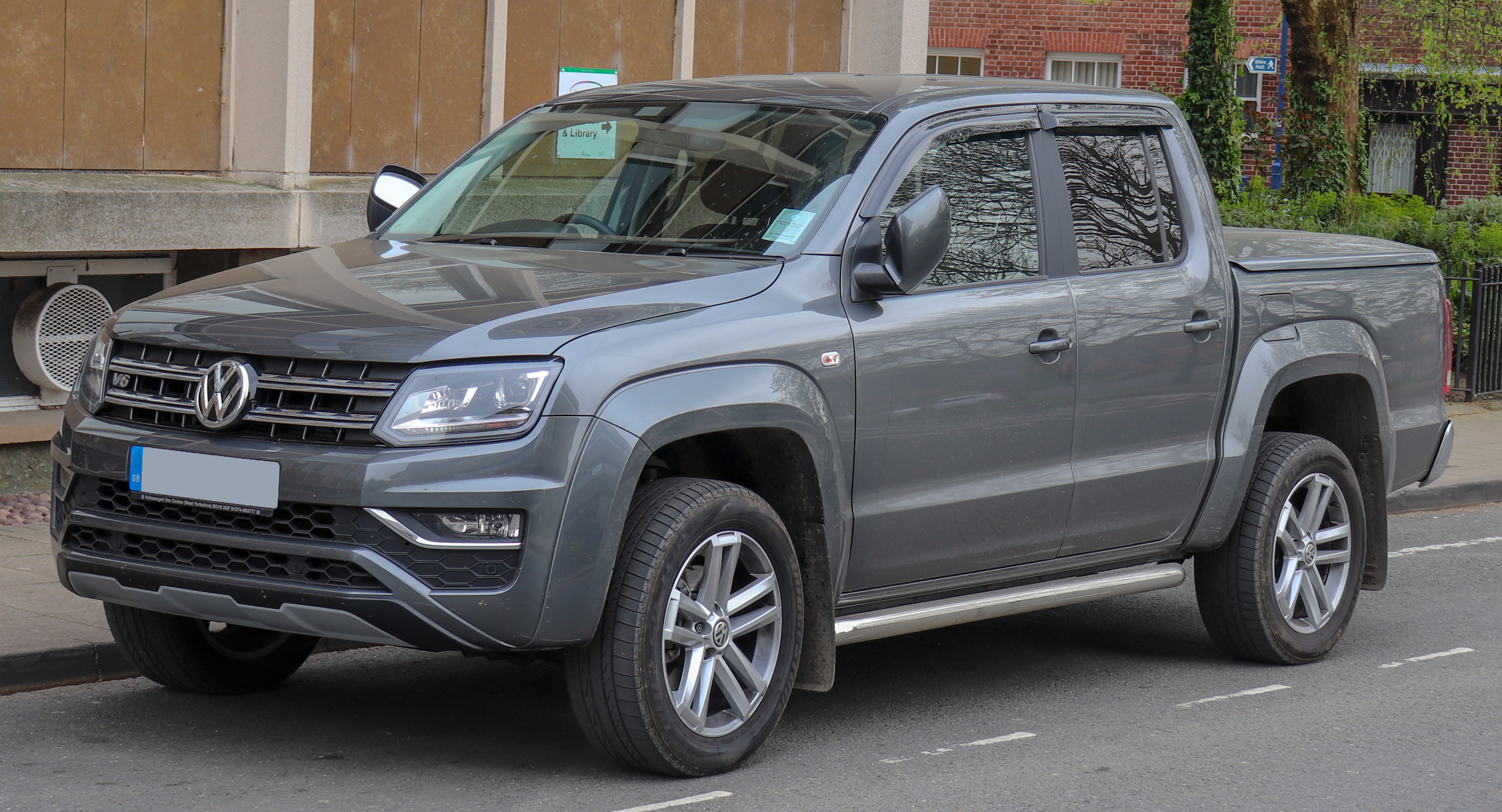
2019 Volkswagen Amarok Highline

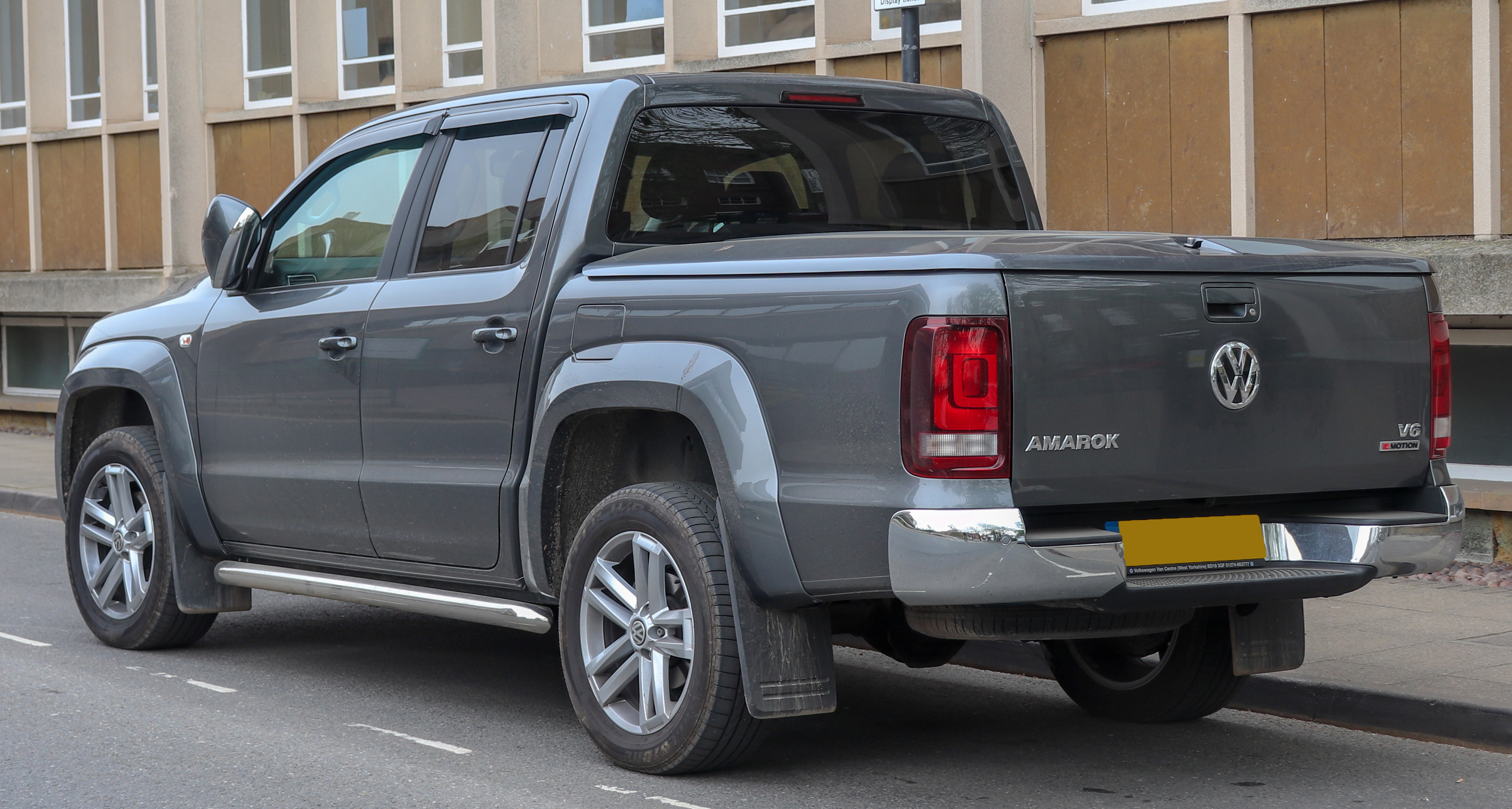
Rear view

==== Second facelift (2024) ====
During summer 2024, a second facelift, designed by Volkswagen design studio in Brazil, was launched for the Argentine market. An online photo leaked in December 2023 of the front end of the new Amarok in Volkswagen's Argentina factory on the production line. The new second facelifted Amarok has a new front-end, incorporating design cues from the Mk2 Amarok. The interior is mostly the same, but it now has a new button-less touchscreen on the dashboard, along with a new operating system for it.

Volkswagen Argentina's product manager explains that the decision not to replace it with the second-generation Volkswagen Amarok was based on the first-generation's reputation in the region, as well as its superior performance to the second-generation in terms of handling, comfort and off-road abilities.

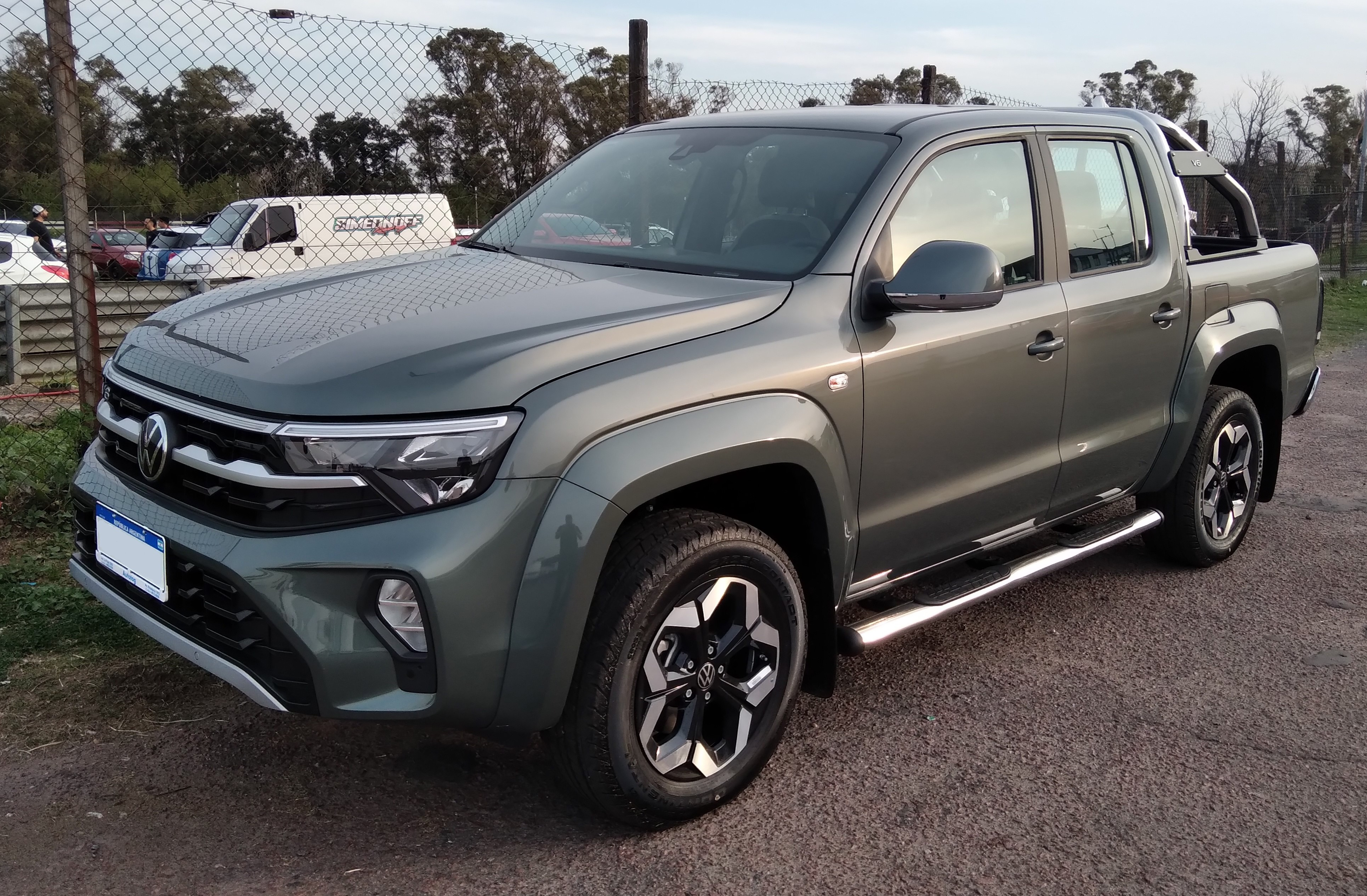
2024 Volkswagen Amarok Highline

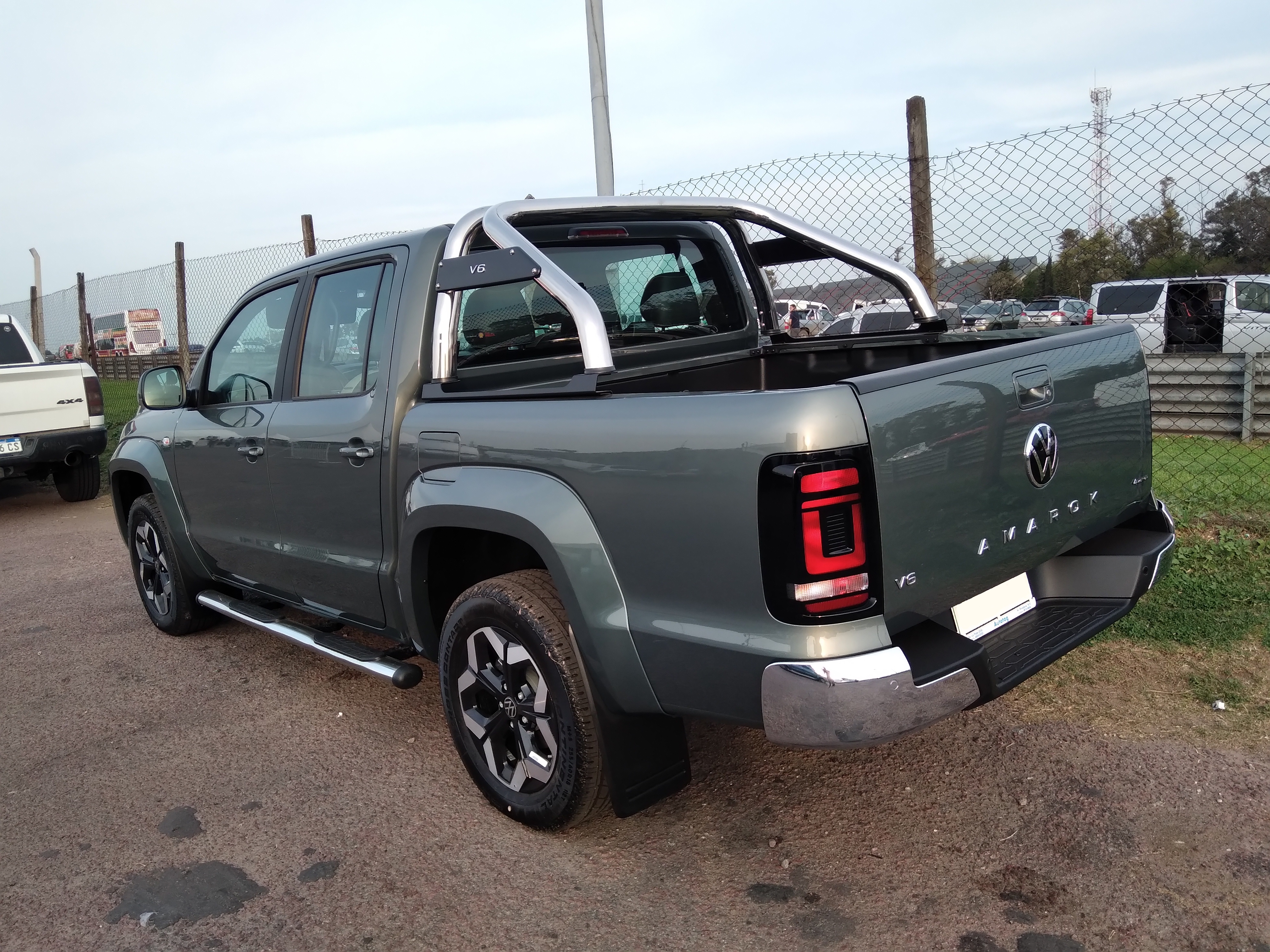
Rear view

=== Driveline ===
The Amarok has three drive concepts: rear wheel drive, Shiftable 4Motion and Permanent 4Motion.The Shiftable all wheel drive system can shift drive between the axles whereas the permanent full-time all wheel drive system distributes power through a torque sensing (Torsen) differential with a 40:60 ratio between the front and rear axles.

==== Low-range gearbox ====
In an exclusive release, Volkswagen Australia launched the Amarok V6 Core in January 2020: the only V6-powered Amarok model to feature a true low-range transfer case (as opposed to the AWD 4Motion system typically employed). Compared to the 4Motion system, the low-range gearbox provides proper low-speed crawling ability and an overall much more rugged driveline for the type of off-roading that is common in Australia. The transfer case is paired only with the 6-speed manual gearbox and the 3.0 V6 TDI engine.

=== Safety ===
In November 2010, the Amarok was awarded 4 stars from Euro NCAP under the 2010/2011 standard crash testing procedure. Testing showed varying degrees of safety for occupants depending on the crash encountered. In February 2011, it received 5 stars from the Australasian New Car Assessment Program (ANCAP).

Euro NCAP test results - 4/5 Stars
Tested criteria	Rating	Protection range
Adult occupant	86%	Acceptable - Poor
Child occupant	64%	Good - Poor
Pedestrian	47%	Good - Poor
Safety assistance	57%	Average

ANCAP test results Volkswagen Amarok New Zealand 2.0L diesel 4x4 dual cab without head-protecting side airbags (2011)
Test	Score
Overall	4 /5 stars
Frontal offset	13.99/16
Side impact	16/16
Pole	Not Assessed
Seat belt reminders	1/3
Whiplash protection	Good
Pedestrian protection	Marginal
Electronic stability control	Standard

ANCAP test results Volkswagen Amarok 2.0L diesel 4x4 dual cab with head-protecting side airbags (2011)
Test	Score
Overall	5 /5 stars
Frontal offset	13.99/16
Side impact	16/16
Pole	2/2
Seat belt reminders	1/3
Whiplash protection	Good
Pedestrian protection	Marginal
Electronic stability control	Standard

The face-lifted first generation Amarok in its most basic Latin American configuration received 3 stars from Latin NCAP 3.0 in 2024 (similar to Euro NCAP 2014).

Latin NCAP 3.5 test results Volkswagen New Amarok + 6 Airbags (2024, similar to Euro NCAP 2017)
Test	Points	%
Overall:	3 /5 stars	
Adult occupant:	32.35	81%
Child occupant:	42.67	87%
Pedestrian:	29.85	62%
Safety assist:	28.50	66%

=== Availability ===
The first-generation Amarok was available in Argentina, Australia, Brazil, Chile, Colombia, Costa Rica, Ecuador, Peru, Paraguay, Mexico, Mongolia, New Zealand, South Africa, and throughout Europe and South America. VW met with Canadian and American dealerships in 2012 to talk about introducing the pickup to those markets. For the U.S., it would likely necessitate moving production or building a plant somewhere in North America, to avoid the chicken tax enacted to light commercial vehicles.

=== Variants ===
The Amarok was launched in a Double Cab variant with the Single Cab first launching in late 2011 in South Africa and Europe.

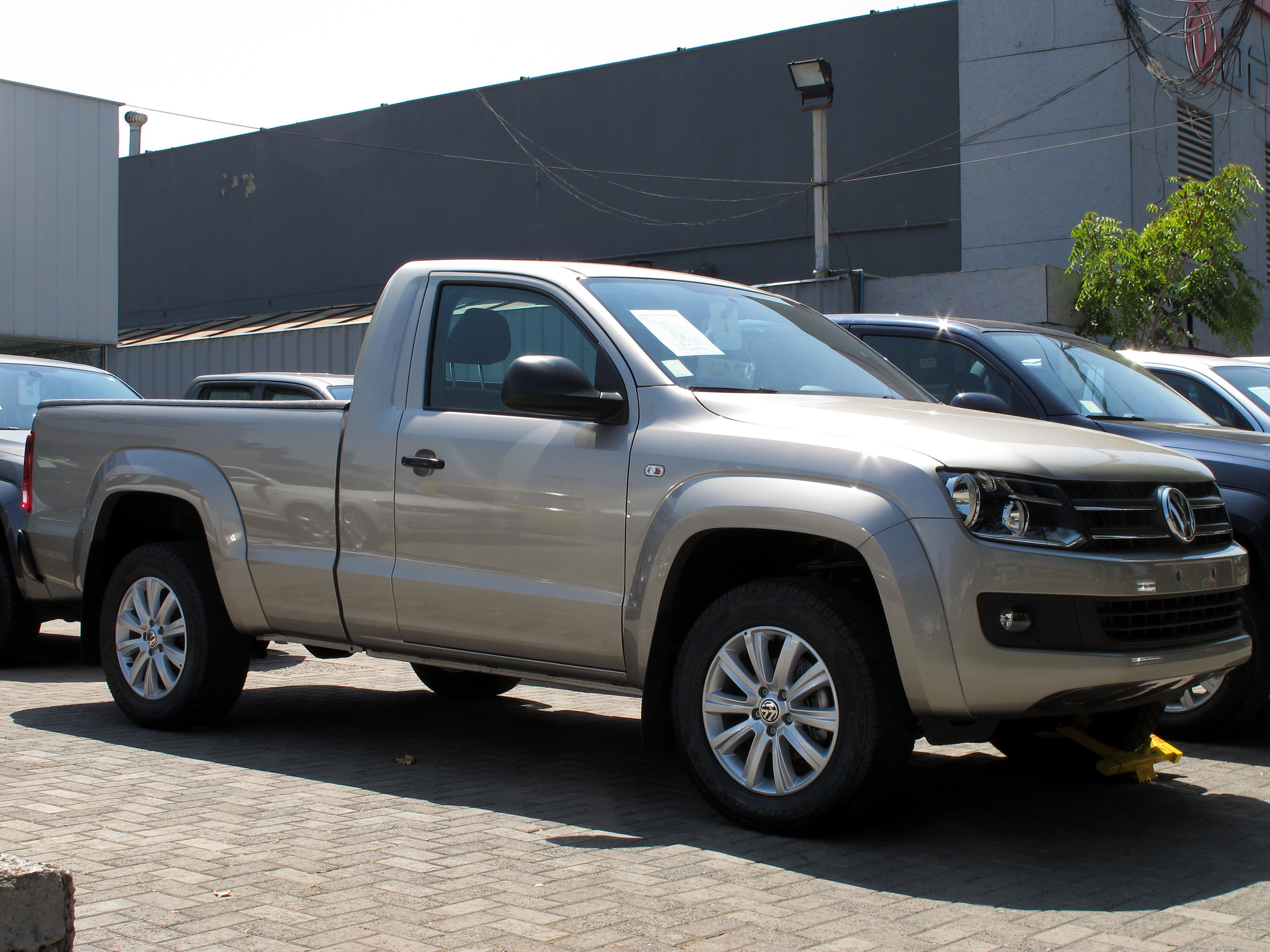
Volkswagen Amarok single cab

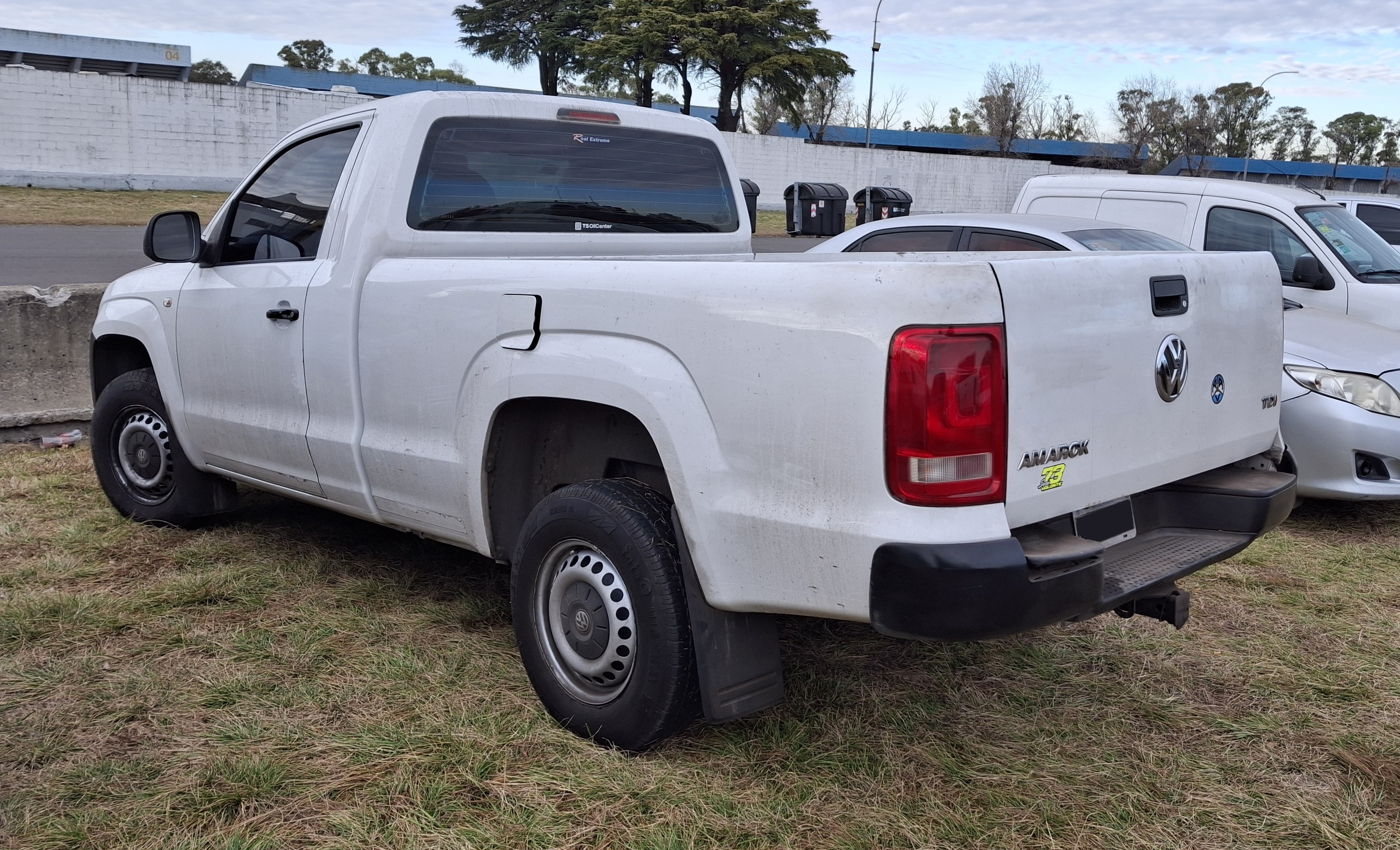
Rear view

Core V6 Low-Range

Currently offered exclusive on the Australian market since early 2020, the Core V6 (also called TDI500 Core) is the only V6 Amarok variant in Australia to feature a true low-range transfer case. The Core V6 low-range was a result of strong lobbying by Volkswagen Australia to the parent organisation; citing strong demand from consumers, coupled with Australia being the number one importer of V6 Amaroks as rationale for the decision.

The Amarok has been often criticised for its lack of a low-range 4WD transfer case which is less complex and much more widely preferred in the off-road community for the design's reliability and strength in more extreme off-road duties, than AWD systems such as 4Motion.

The engine of the TDI500 Core is de-rated to 500Nm of torque (hence the TDI500 designation) to suit the 6 speed manual transmission. This new model is considered a base model and as such features cloth seating and lacks carpet, instead opting for rubber flooring. However, it still retains several 'premium' features such as a leather-wrapped steering wheel, 17-inch alloy wheels and a touchscreen infotainment system with Apple CarPlay and Android Auto functionality.

There is also an additional variant, named the Core V6 Enduro which features primarily aesthetic enhancements such as a sports bar and decals in addition to the low-range transfer case. Interestingly, this variant is offered for the same price as the standard Core V6 manual.

XL +31 CM
XXL

Offers an extended bed with 2.21 m (7 ft 3 in) of space and a slightly longer wheelbase.

Chassis cab

In 2006 the Australian publication Transport Today reported that Phil Clark, Volkswagen Commercial Vehicles Director in Australia, was trying to persuade Volkswagen's head office to add a chassis cab programme to Project RPU.

Cab Chassis variants of both the Single Cab and Double Cab will launch with the 2012 Model Year range.

Amarok Sochi Special Edition

The official vehicle of the 2014 Winter Olympics, the Amarok Sochi Special Edition was available only in Russia. It adds extra exterior chrome trim, a navigation system and an updated interior.

Amarok Polar Expedition

The Polar Expedition variant was designed to promote the 2014 Sochi Winter Olympic Games in the remote areas of Russia. Three of these trucks were built to carry nine people 9,942 mi (16,000 km) east by road from Moscow to the city of Petropavlovsk-Kamchatsky on the Kamchatka peninsula. The team of 9 earned the Guinness World Record for the longest off-road journey through one country. The team took 66 days to reach Kamchatka from Moscow by driving over the glacier-covered Sredinny Range and were the first people to do so. The specially built Amaroks received a couple of upgrades to take on the cold and road less wilderness. The team replaced the front and rear suspension with long-travel, heavy-duty shocks and massive tires with deeper ridges for extra traction in deep snow and ice. The body was unmodified except for cutting out the fenders to fit the wheels and tires. The 2.0L turbo diesel engine remained mostly unmodified because the goal was reliability. For added safety, the interior was fitted with a roll cage and navigation equipment to make sure the team didn't get lost.

Spin-offs

Rumoured platform spin-offs include a five to seven seat SUV to compete with Nissan Xterra and Toyota Hilux SW4 to be built in Brazil for the South American and European markets.

The Dutch Ministry of Defence has announced plans to phase out other vehicles, including the Mercedes-Benz G-Wagen, in favour of the Amarok to move to a single type of truck for peacetime operations. The stated aims for this plan are to purchase 1,667 new vehicles for the Army, the Navy, the Air Force, and the Marechaussee.

=== Awards ===
- Auto Esporte – Pickup of the Year 2011 (Brazil)
- Safest Pickup 2011
- Auto Test – Cruze, Uno and Amarok, the best of the year according to Auto Test (Argentina)
- Parabrisas – Pickup of the Year 2011 (Argentina)
- MotorTransport – International Pickup Truck of the Year (UK)
- OFF ROAD – Pickup of the Year 2011 (Germany)
- Magazin Jäger – Goldenen Keiler (Golden Boar) Best Hunting Car (Germany)
- ROAD – Russian Automobile Dealers Golden Klaxon – Special Vehicles Class (Russia)
- What Van? – Pickup of the Year 2012 (UK)
- 4X4 Australia – Ute of the Year 2011 (Australia)
- Delivery – Ute of the Year 2011 (Australia)
- Zoo Magazine – Manliest Motor of the Year 2011 (UK)
- British Insurance Vehicle Security Awards – Best Pickup of the Year 2011 (UK)
- Motoring.com.au 2017 Dual-Cab Ute Comparison Winner
- Stuff Motoring New Zealand Top Pick-up of 2017
- Tow Car Awards 1,900 kg+ & Best Pick-up Winner 2018
- International Ute of the Year 2018

=== Search and Rescue Pickup concept ===
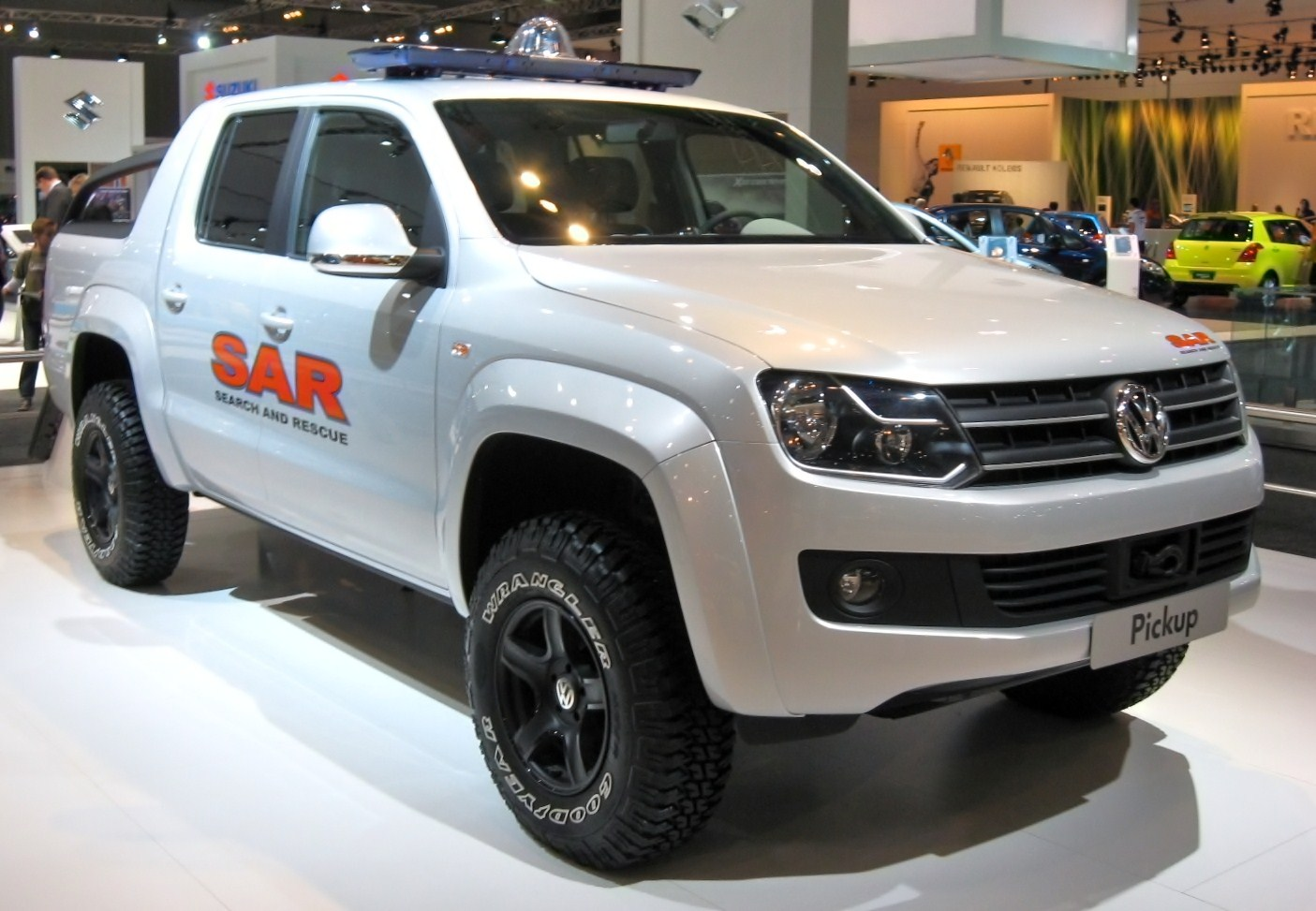
2008 SAR Concept Pickup at the 2009 Melbourne International Motor Show

Volkswagen revealed their one tonne pickup study at the 2008 IAA Commercial Vehicle Show in September; the SAR Pickup measures 5.18 m (17 ft) in length and 1.90 m (6 ft 3 in) in width, and the 1.55 m (5 ft 1 in) long cargo bed can carry a Euro sized broad pallet sideways.

SAR Pickup concept also was equipped for Lifeguards with: four mobile CB radios, flashlights, first aid kit with a defibrillator, binoculars, two safety helmets, removable neoprene seats for hard wearing, and a blue light roof module with integrated searchlight.

Possible production features that were on the concept: radio navigation system controlled by a multifunction touch screen, differential locks, cable winch and the rear logo opens the tailgate.

== Second generation (NF; 2022) ==
Second generation
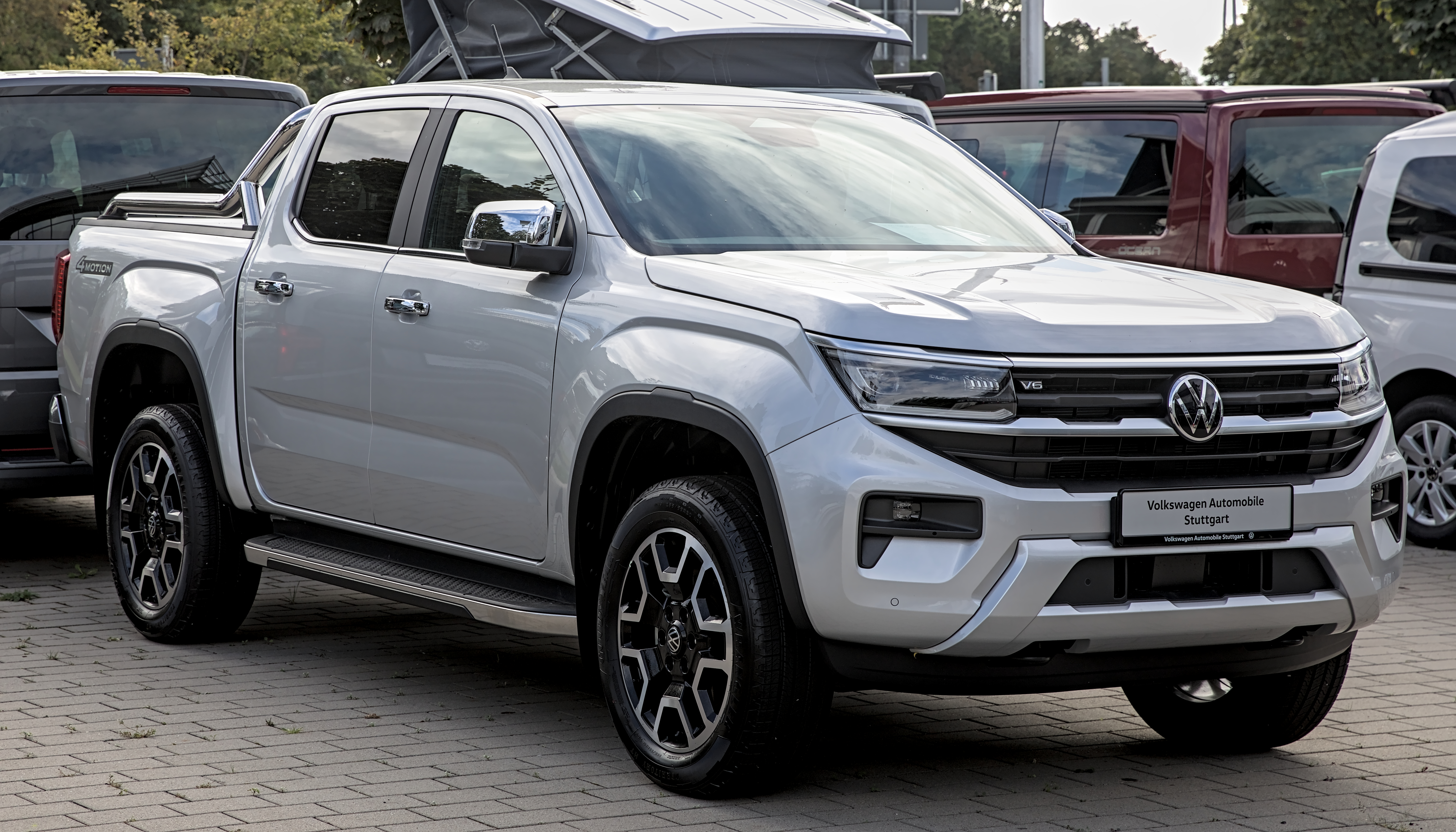

Overview
- Model code: Typ NF
- Also called: Ford Ranger T6
- Production: 2022–present
- Assembly: South Africa: Silverton, Pretoria (Ford South Africa)
- Designer: Dennis Kosik (exterior); Dominik Krug (interior) under Gu-Han Kim

Body and chassis
- Platform: Ford T6
- Related: Ford Ranger (P703); Ford Everest (U704)

Powertrain
- Engine: Petrol: 2.3 L TSI I4 turbo; Diesel: 2.0 L TDI I4 turbo; 2.0 L TDI I4 twin-turbo; 3.0 L TDI V6 turbo
- Transmission: 5-speed manual; 6-speed manual; 6-speed 6R80 automatic; 10-speed 10R80 automatic

Dimensions
- Wheelbase: 3,270 mm (128.7 in)
- Length: 5,350 mm (210.6 in)
- Width: 1,910 mm (75.2 in)
- Height: 1,888 mm (74.3 in)

The second-generation Amarok was released on 7 July 2022. Designed and conceived in Germany and Australia, it is built by Ford at its South African assembly plant in Silverton, and shares the new Ford Ranger's platform as part of the 2019 Ford-VW global alliance cooperation agreement.

A four-door double cab and two-door single cab body styles are available in this generation. The vehicle is 96 mm (3.8 in) longer than its predecessor, with 173 mm (6.8 in) longer wheelbase which provides more room, on the double cab's second row seat. Fording depth was also increased from 500 mm (19.7 in) to 800 mm (31.5 in).

During its introduction, the second-generation Amarok was introduced with five variants. The base version is the 'Amarok', followed by the 'Life' and 'Style'. Two flagship variants is offered as the PanAmericana (with an off-road-inspired styling) and Aventura (with an on-road-oriented styling).

In November 2025 Volkswagen re-introduced the "Dark-label" for Europe. It adds Dark Label badging onto the steering wheel and front floor mats, black upholstery, 20-inch alloy wheels, tailgate handle and a rear privacy glass. It is available in Bright Blue, Midnight Black, and Dark Grey.

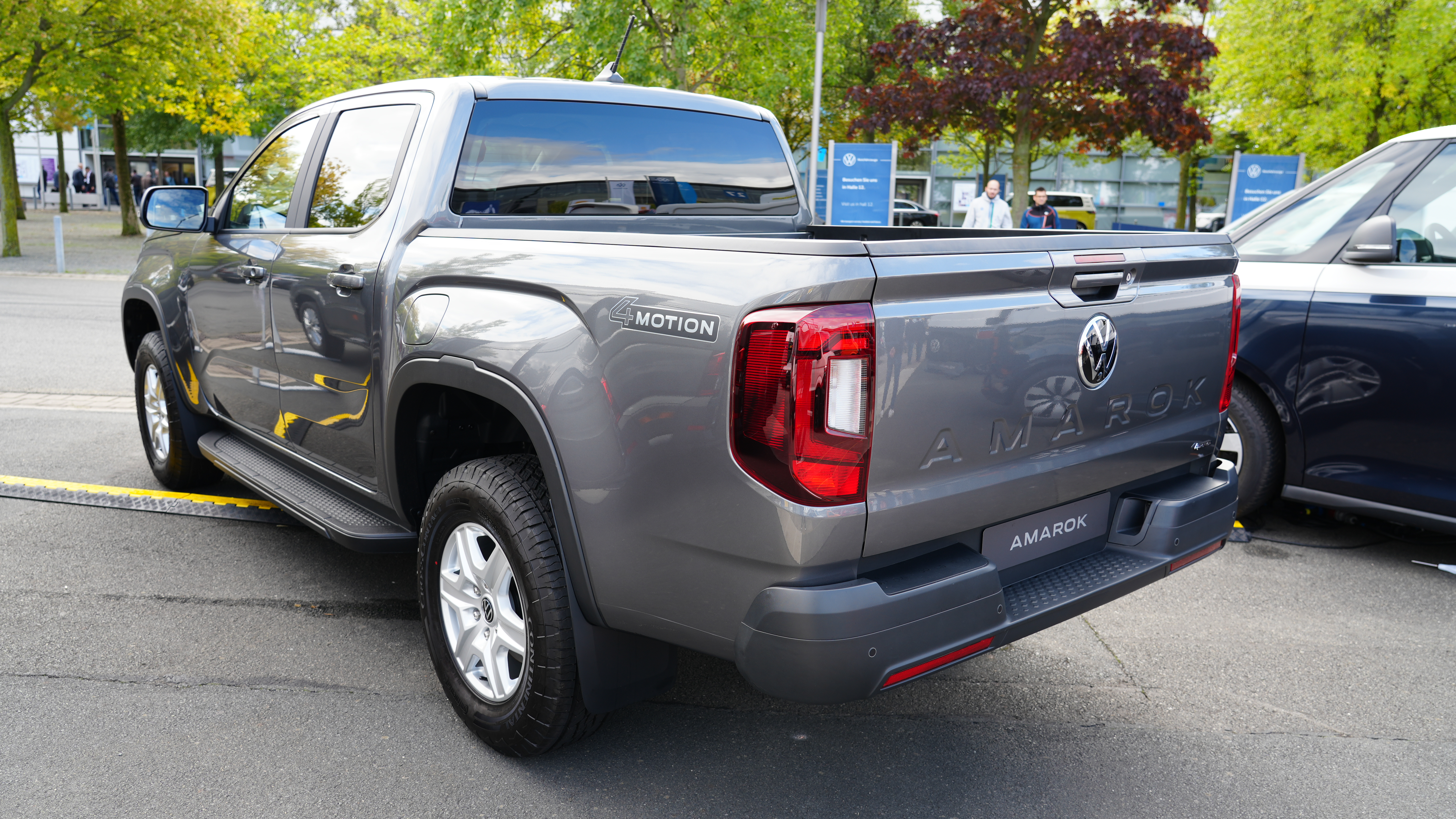
Rear View

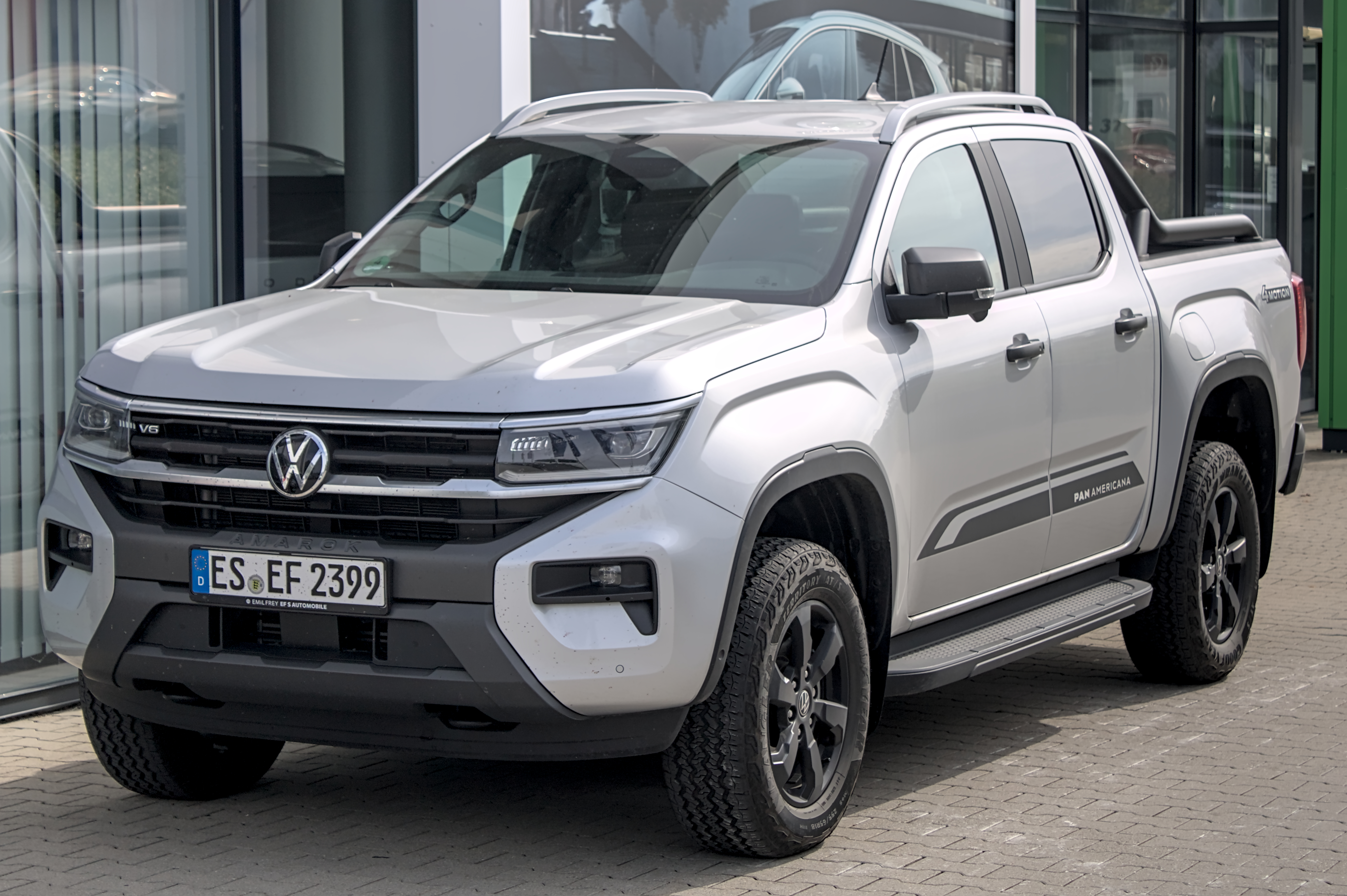
Amarok PanAmericana

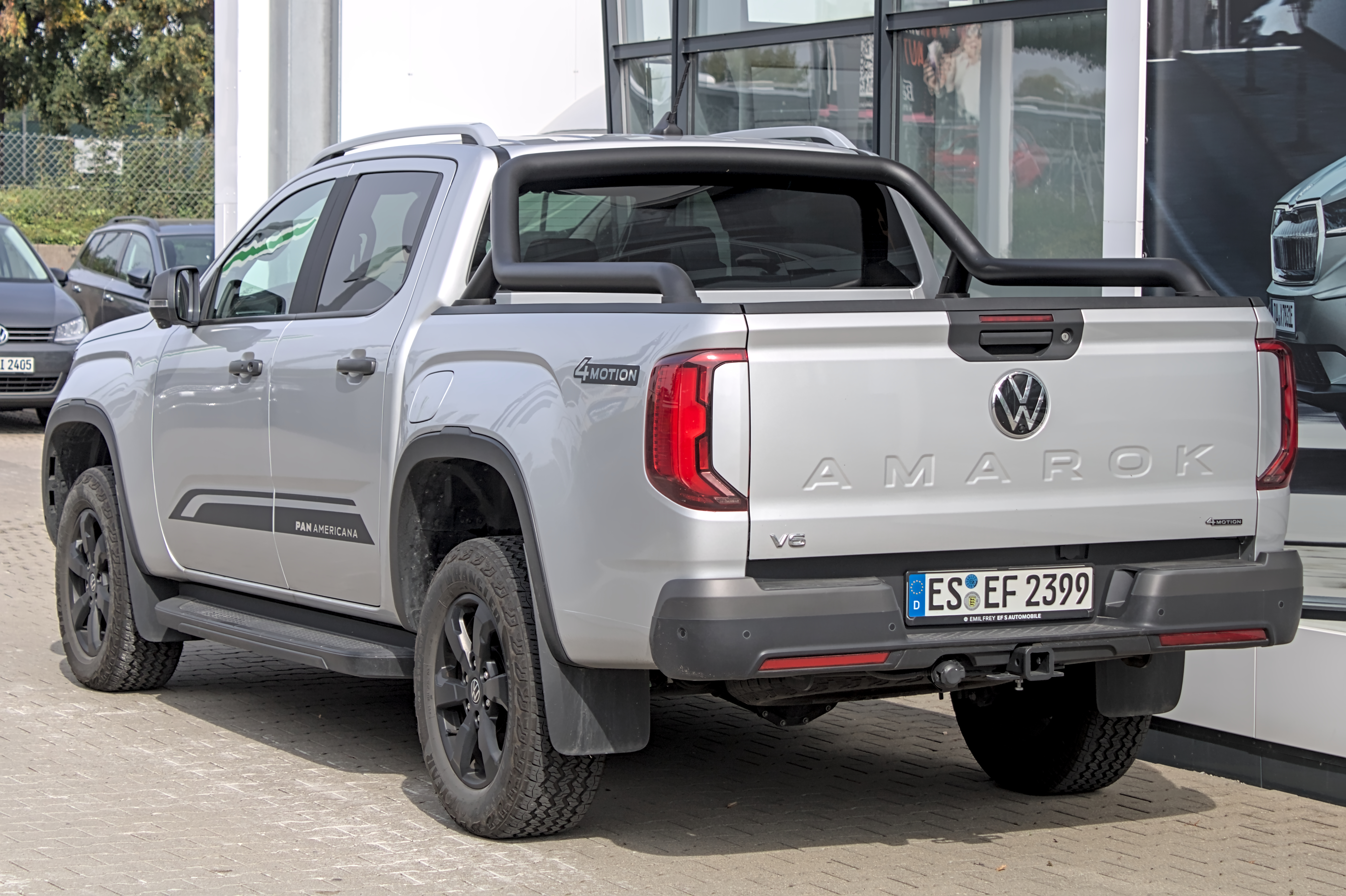
Rear View

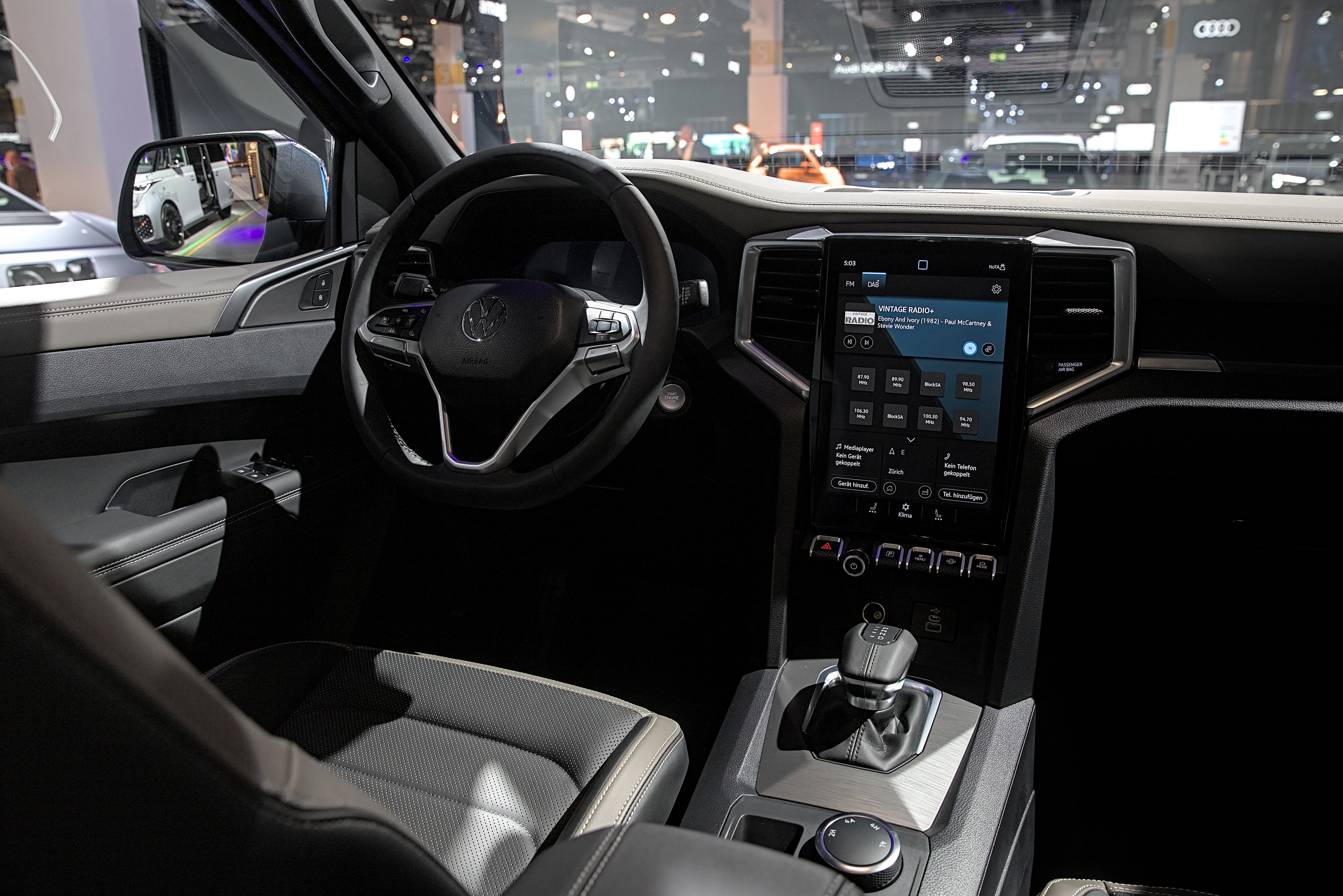
Interior

=== Powertrain ===
Four turbo-diesel (TDI) engines and one turbocharged petrol (TSI) engine is available for the second-generation Amarok. In several African markets, the base specification engine is offered, which is a 2.0-litre four-cylinder TDI producing 110 kW (150 PS; 148 hp). The same engine is also offered in a higher state of tune with 125 kW (170 PS; 168 hp), and with a twin-turbo producing 150 kW (204 PS; 201 hp) or 154 kW (209 PS; 207 hp) depending on the market. A 3.0-litre Ford-Jaguar Land Rover-developed AJD-V6 engine is available as the most powerful option, which provides power output of 177 kW (241 PS; 237 hp) or 184 kW (250 PS; 247 hp) dependent on the market. A single petrol engine option, 2.3-litre turbocharged petrol engine with 222 kW (302 PS; 298 hp) is also offered in traditional petrol engine markets.

The 154 kW (209 PS; 207 hp) Amarok diesel is equipped with a standard 10-speed automatic gearbox paired with a e-shifter (shift-by-wire). There are 6-speed automatic transmission and 5- or 6-speed manual gearboxes for other engines.

=== Safety ===
Euro NCAP test results Volkswagen Amarok 2.0 (2022)
Test	Points	%
Overall:	5 /5 stars	
Adult occupant:	32	84%
Child occupant:	44.2	90%
Pedestrian:	40	74%
Safety assist:	13.6	84%

ANCAP test results Volkswagen all dual cab variants (2024, aligned with Euro NCAP)
Test	Points	%
Overall:	5 /5 stars	
Adult occupant:	32.98	86%
Child occupant:	46	93%
Pedestrian:	39.6	74%
Safety assist:	13.39	83%

== Production and sales ==
Year	Global production
2009	193
2010	44,525
2011	76,965
2012	78,633
2013	91,739
2014	69,695
2015	81,019
2016	63,367
2017	80,328
2018	88,950
2019	72,513
2020	52,100
2021	42,755
2022	42,806
2023	43,512
