= Delaugère et Clayette =

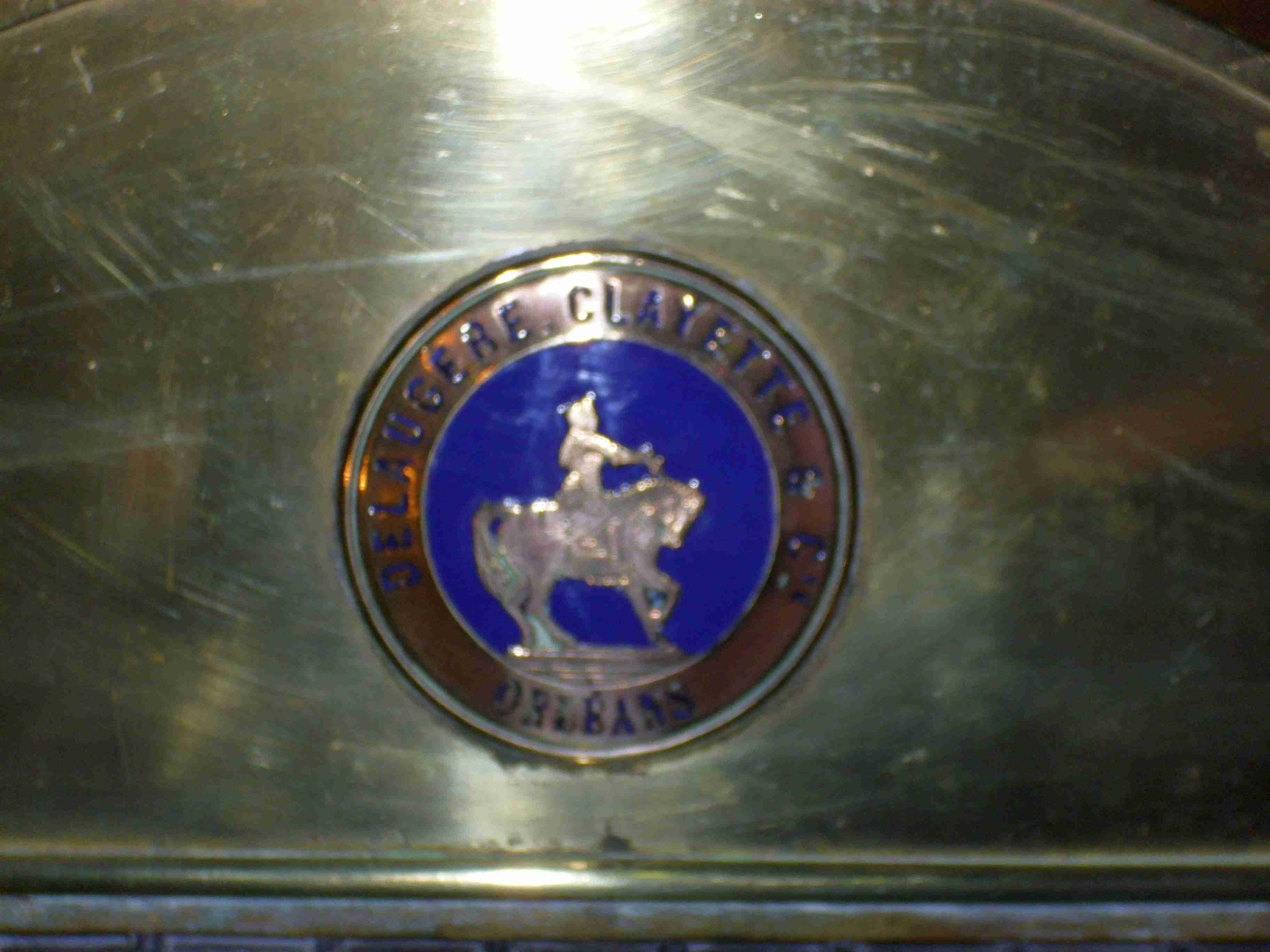
Delaugère et Clayette emblem

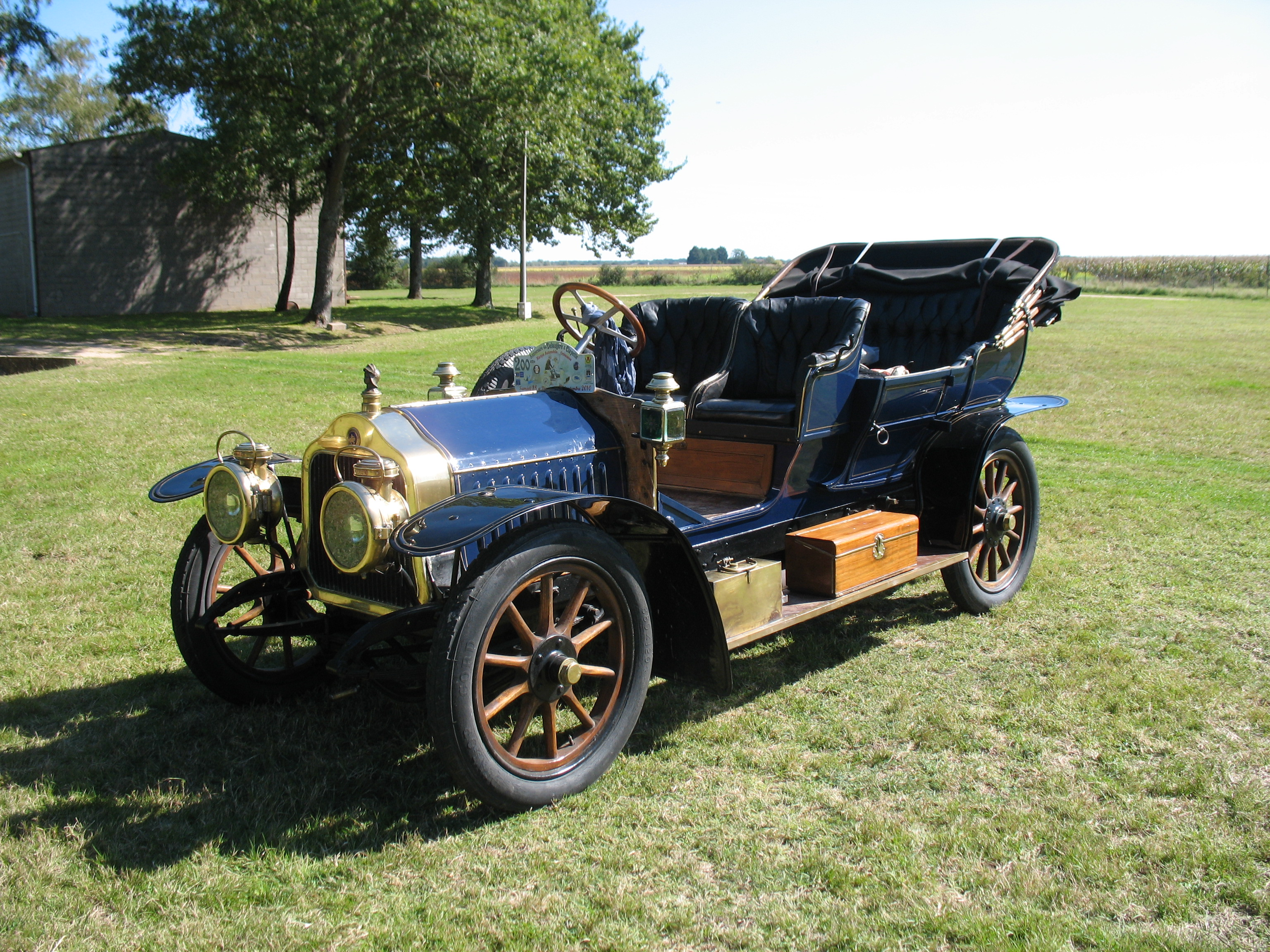
1908 double phaeton

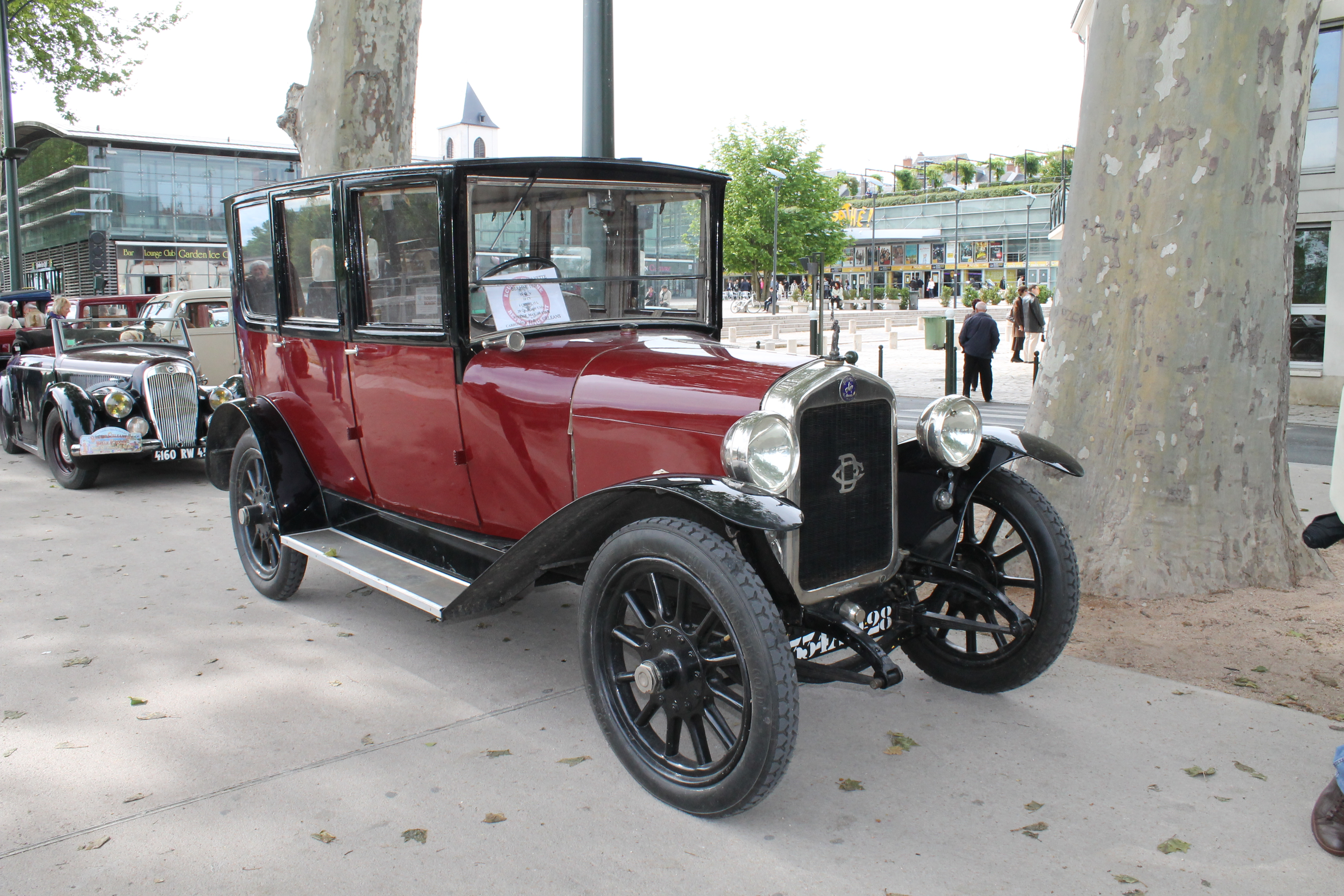
Torpédo luxe 1923

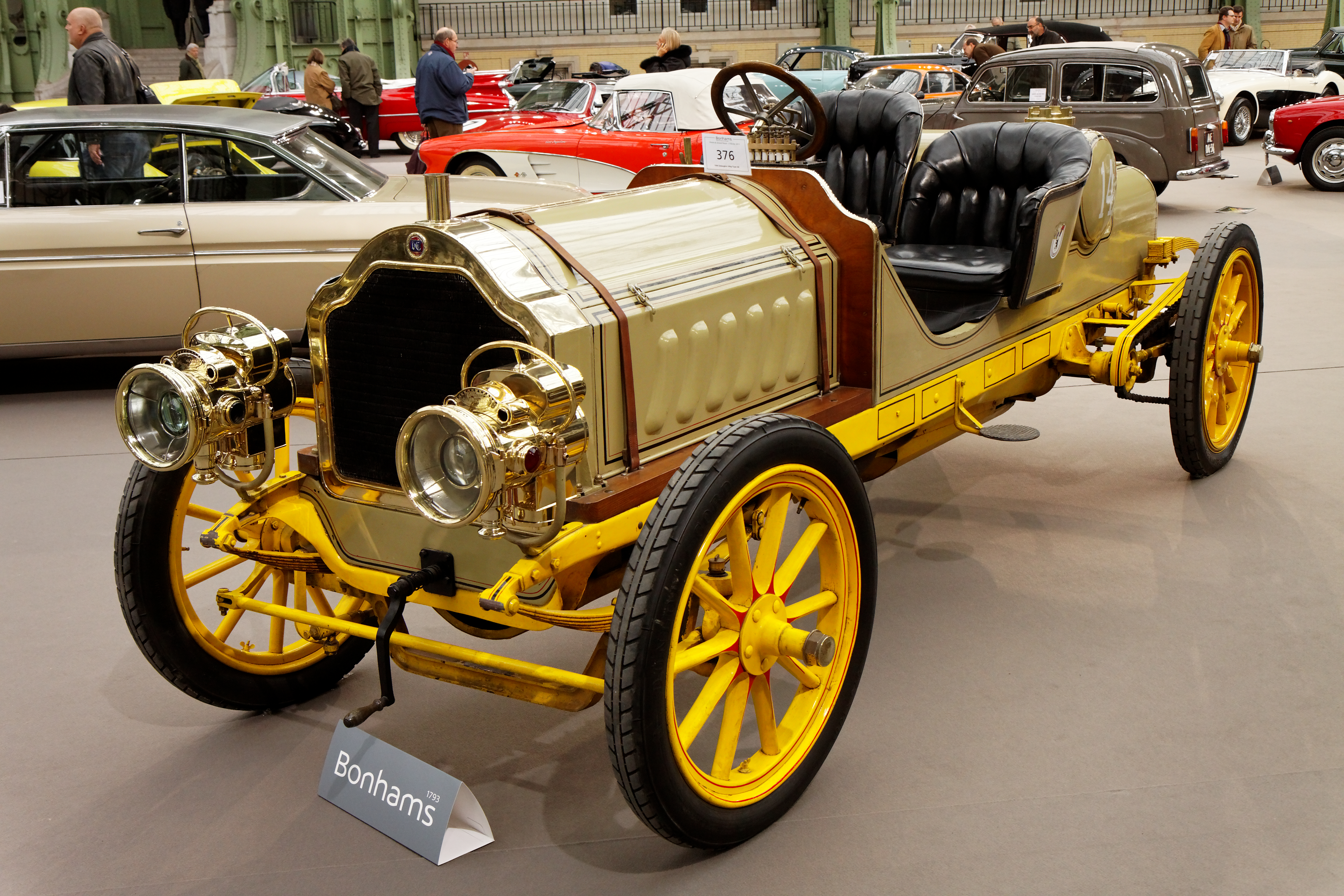
Delaugère & Clayette 24hp Type 4A - 1904

Delaugère et Clayette was a car manufacturer based in Orléans, France.

== History ==
Delaugère was a registered horse-drawn carriage and automobile manufacturer. It was founded in 1864 by Jean-Pierre Delaugère in Orléans, France, and his two sons Henri and Émile took over after he died in 1868. The brand released his first cart (three-wheeled vehicle powered by a 474 cm³) in 1898. In 1906, the brand merged with the Clayette brothers (from Meung-sur-Loire, France) to become "Delaugère and Clayette" and started manufacturing its first engines. The brand quickly became known for its cars as being one of the most luxurious and most expensive brands in Europe (which could easily reach 500 000 km). Its capital was then higher than Renault and Peugeot. The company and its 350 workers produced two cars per day at that time. The company was taken over by Panhard in 1934 after the death of Félix Delaugère, the son of Henry.

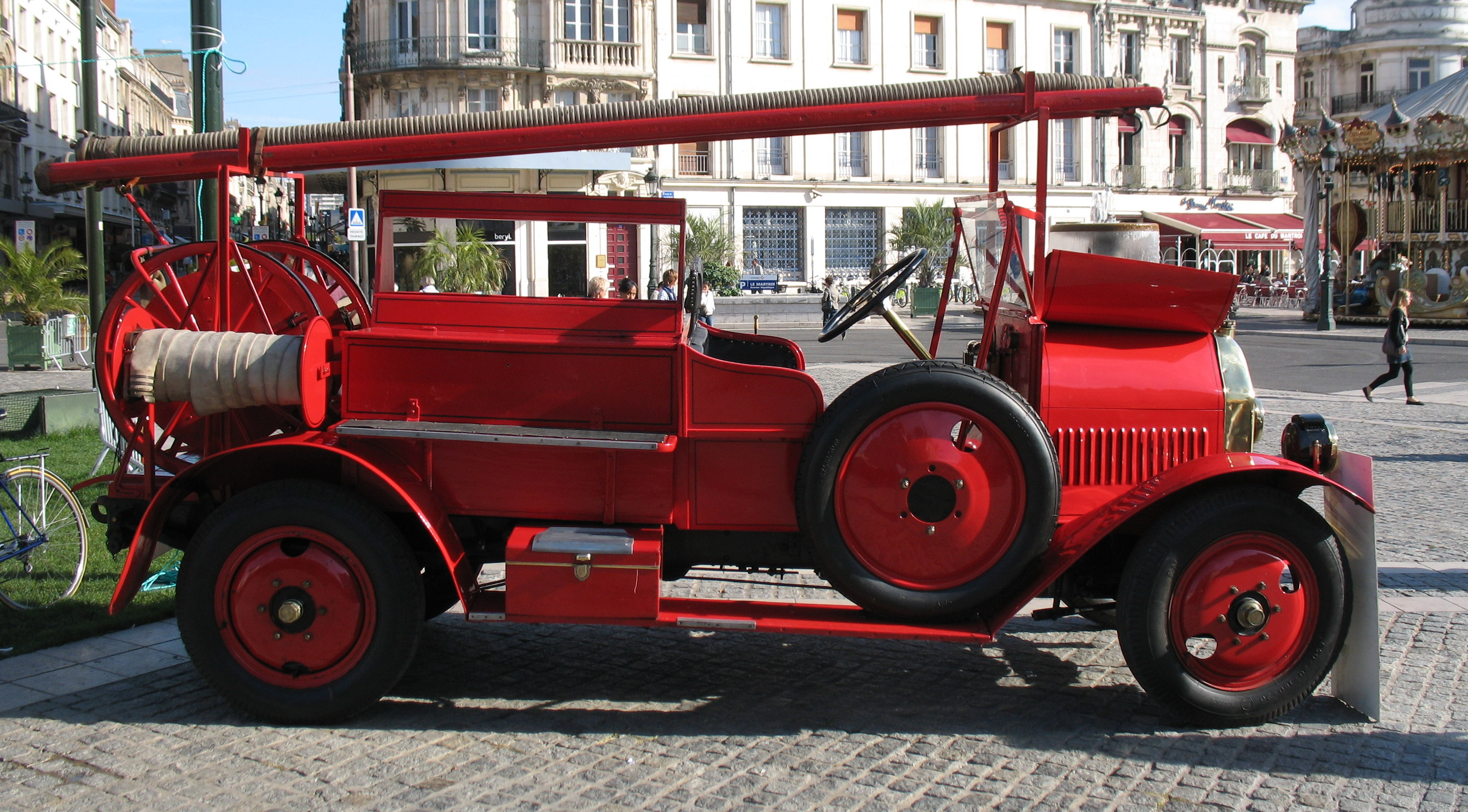
1924 Delaugère et Clayette firetruck

== Logo ==
The brand's logo is Joan of Arc riding a horse.
