= Volkswagen Argentina =

Argentine subsidiary of Volkswagen

Volkswagen Group Argentina
- Type: Subsidiary
- Industry: Automotive
- Predecessor: Chrysler Fevre Argentina
- Founded: 1980; 46 years ago
- Headquarters: General Pacheco, Argentina
- Area served: Worldwide
- Key people: Thomas Owsianski (President)
- Products: Automobiles, pickups, transmissions
- Services: Automotive financial services
- Number of employees: c. 7,000
- Parent: Volkswagen Group
- Divisions: List: Volkswagen Vehículos de Pasajeros; Volkswagen Vehículos Comerciales; Volkswagen Camiones y Buses; Audi; Ducati
- Website: volkswagen.com.ar

Volkswagen Group Argentina is the Argentine subsidiary of German automotive manufacturing company Volkswagen Group. It was established in 1980 when the company acquired defunct business Chrysler Fevre Argentina including its two plants in San Justo and Monte Chingolo.

Nowadays VW Argentina has two plants, one in General Pacheco where the company produces its vehicles, and the other in Córdoba. The latter is dedicated exclusively to make automobile transmissions, with total of the production exported to Europe. The plants were inaugurated in 1995 and 1996, respectively.

In 2010, a total of 135,600 vehicles were delivered. During its more than 40 years operating in Argentina, Volkswagen has produced and imported several type of vehicles including automobiles, pickups, minibuses, and trucks.

== History ==
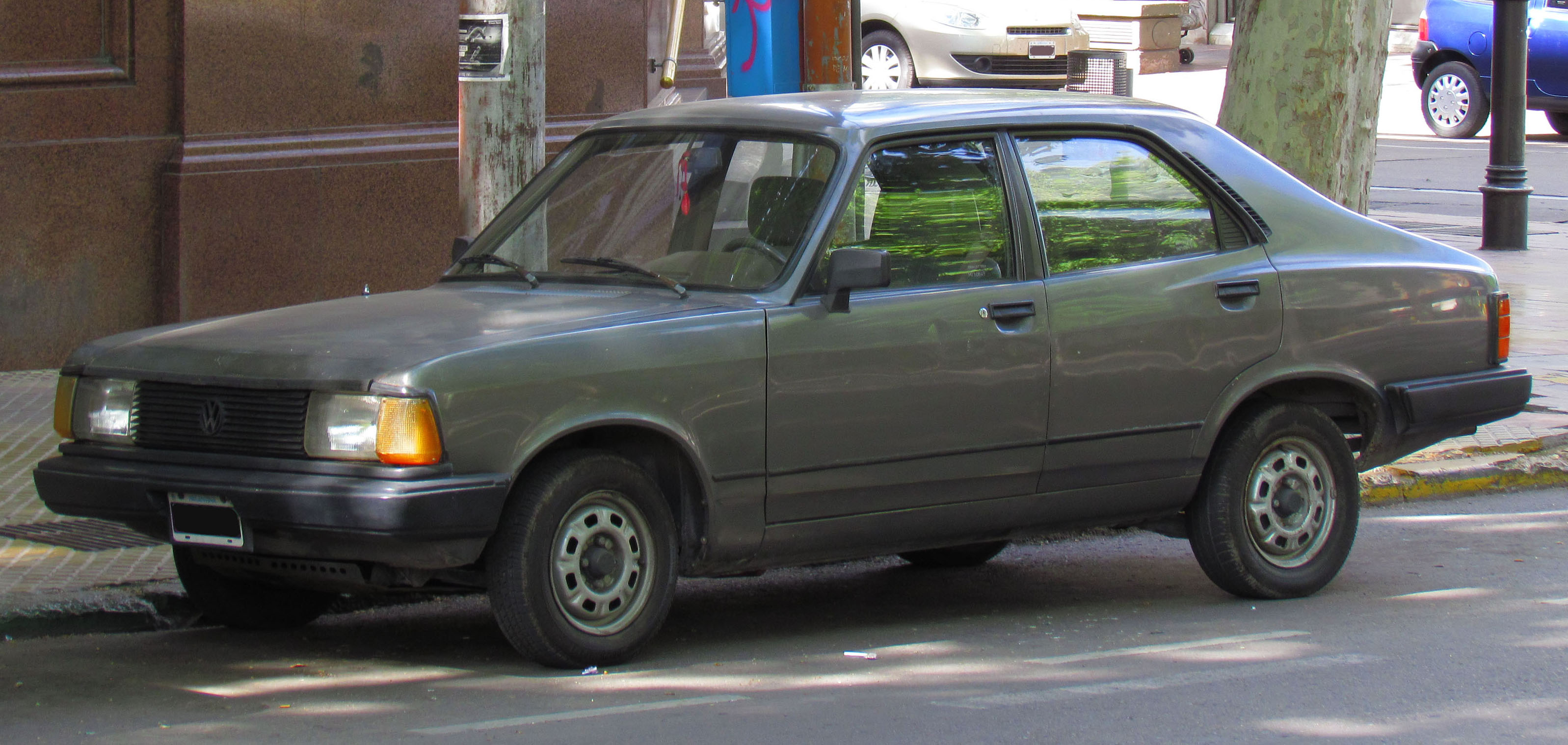
The VW 1500 (took over after Chrysler left in 1979) was the first model produced by Volkswagen in Argentina

Volkswagen started its operations in Argentina in 1980 after acquiring Chrysler Fevre Argentina and its plants in San Justo and Monte Chingolo in Buenos Aires Province. Therefore "Volkswagen Argentina" became the 8th subsidiary of the Volkswagen Group worldwide. Volkswagen took over production of the 1500 model, previously marketed by Chrysler under its Dodge brand. When VW took over complete control in 1982, the car was rebadged as "Volkswagen 1500", being also produced by Volkswagen Brazil. The VW 1500 was produced in Argentina until 1990, when it was discontinued. Since its inception in 1971, a total of 262,668 Dodge/VW 1500 were produced.

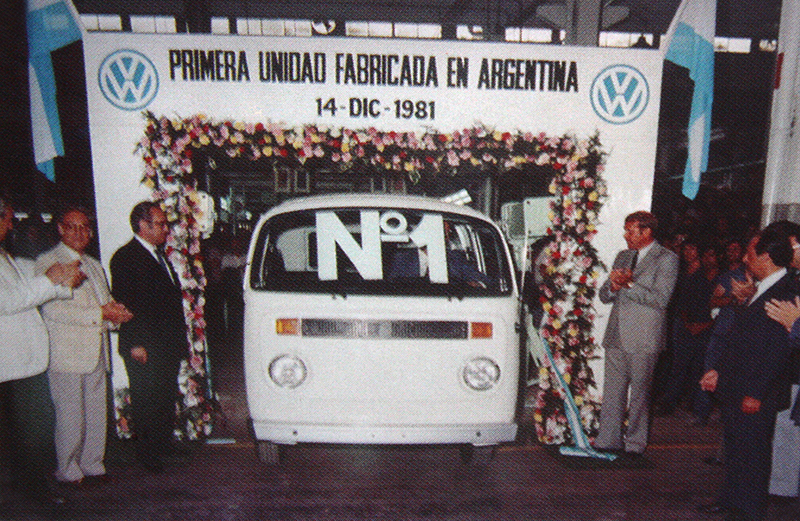
In 1981 VW Argentina produced the first "Combi" (Type 2 model)

Volkswagen introduced its first utility vehicles in 1982, producing the 2nd. generation of the Transporter (renamed "Combi" locally). The Combi was produced until 1990 in three versions: minivan, panel van, and pickup. The minibus version was the most popular with 11,331 units produced while the pickup was discontinued in 1986.

In 1983 the company started production of the "Gacel", a 4-door version of its Brazilian Volkswagen Gol first generation. The firm also imported the Passat and Santana (renamed "Carat") models from Brazil.

For economic reasons, in 1987 Volkswagen started a joint venture with Ford Motor Argentina to form Autolatina, moving operations to Ford's Pacheco Stamping and Assembly. During those years, the company commercialised the Gol model (which became the all-time most selling model in the history of Argentine industry) and the Saveiro pickup truck. By mid-1994 Ford and Volkswagen dissolved AutoLatina and the local VW subsidiary started to operate as "Volkswagen Group Argentina".

When the economic situation improved significantly by 1995, Volkswagen re-founded its plants and in the same year commissioned a new plant in General Pacheco. That same year the Gol began to be made in the country, having produced 190,511 units until 2003. In 1996 Volkswagen started production of the Polo Classic and the (second generation of) Caddy van (originally designed by SEAT and marketed in Spain as "SEAT Inca"). A total of 287,000 vehicles (Polo and Caddy) had been produced in General Pacheco until 2008. Other successful model produced was the "Suran", a station wagon version of the Fox model with more than 440,000 units produced from 2006 to 2019. Volkswagen opened a new plant in Córdoba in 2001 to produce transmissions exclusively.

In 2009 Volkswagen Argentina started production of the Amarok, the first global pickup of VW Group. On 15 July 2013, Volkswagen produced its 1,000,000 vehicle in the Pacheco plant. Since 2011, the company has maintained its own chair at the National Technical University in Pacheco with the Ferdinand Porsche Institute.

In 2019, Volkswagen Argentina reached 16 consecutive years as the top selling vehicle manufacturer in Argentina, with 1,5 million vehicles produced in General Pacheco and 14 million transmissions made in Córdoba. All the transmissions produced are exclusively for export. A total of 568,000 Amarok had been produced by mid-2020, becoming the model with more units made in that factory. The Amarok was exported to over 35 countries worldwide.

With an investment of US$650 million and launched in April 2021, the Taos became the first crossover SUV to be manufactured by VW Argentina.

== Produced models ==
=== Current production ===
Name	Type	Origin	Orig. name	Produced	Image
Amarok	Pickup	GER	Amarok	2009–present	

=== Past production ===
Name	Type	Origin	Orig. marque	Orig. name	Produced	Image
1500 (Note: It had been previously manufactured by Chrysler Fevre Argentina under the Dodge brand.)	Sedan	UK	Rootes Group	Hillman Avenger	1982–88	
Combi	Minivan / Panel van / Pickup	GER	Volkswagen	Transporter (2nd. generation)	1981–90	
Gacel (Note: It was renamed "Senda" in 1990.)	Sedan / Station wagon	BRA	Volkswagen	Gol (1st. generation)	1983–96	
Gol / Voyage (Note: In Argentina, the "Voyage" was the 4-door version of the Gol.)	Subcompact / Station wagon (Note: Rebranded "Gol Country", produced until 2013.)/ Pickup (Note: Named "Saveiro".)	BRA	Volkswagen	Gol (1st.–3rd. generation)	1993–2021	
Polo Classic	Sedan	GER	Volkswagen	Derby (3rd. generation)	1996–2008	
Caddy	Van	SPA	SEAT	Inca	1996–2008	
Suran	Mini MPV	BRA	Volkswagen	Fox (station wagon)	2007–19	
Taos	Crossover SUV	GER	Volkswagen	Taos	2021-25	

== Imported models ==
- Beetle (1980–84)
- Passat (1980-1982, 1994–1996, 1998- 2006, 2006– 2018) (Note: The first lines of Passat commercialised in Argentina were imported from Brazil.)
- Carat (Note: Rebrand of the Santana model.)
- Quantum (1991–1996) (Note: Rebrand of the Passat model. marketed in Argentina as a station wagon.)
- Golf (1995-present)
- Sharan (2001–10)
- New Beetle (2000–0?)
- Polo (2018-present)
- Polo Sedan (2015-18)
- Bora (2001–14)
- Volkswagen Fox (2005–20)
- Tiguan (2008–present)
- Vento (2010–present) (Note: Rebrand of the Jetta A5/A6/A7 model.)
- Scirocco (2012-17)
- The Beetle (2014–17)
- Up! (2015–20)
- Virtus (2018–present)
- T-Cross (2019–present)
- Touareg (2011-2025)
- Nivus (2020–present)
- Taos (2025–present)
- Tera (2025–present) (Note: Rebrand of the Taigo model.)
- Delivery (2008–present)
- Constellation (2008–present)
- Multivan (2008–10)
- Volksbus (2008–11)
