= 2005 Porsche Carrera Cup Asia =

Motorsport racing season

The 2005 Porsche Carrera Cup Asia (known for commercial reasons as the 2005 Porsche Infineon Carrera Cup Asia) was the third season of the Porsche Carrera Cup Asia. The season commenced on March 18 at the Sepang International Circuit and finished at the Guia Circuit on November 20.

Briton Jonathan Cocker became the youngest champion of the category to date after reining in season-long championship leader, Nattavude Charoensukawattana to win the title by a single point. Hong Kong driver Alain Li took the Class B championship honours.

== Calendar ==
The following venues hosted at least one round of the 2005 championship.

Round	Circuit	Date	Supporting
1	Sepang International Circuit, Selangor, Malaysia	18–20 March	Malaysian Grand Prix
2	Sepang International Circuit, Selangor, Malaysia	14–15 May	Formula BMW Asia; Asian Touring Car Series
3	Bira Circuit, Pattaya, Thailand	10–12 June	Formula BMW Asia; Asian Touring Car Series
4	Goldenport Park Circuit, Beijing, China	14–16 July	Formula BMW Asia; Asian Touring Car Series
5	Taebaek Racing Park, Taebaek, South Korea	5–7 August	Formula BMW Asia; Asian Touring Car Series
6	Shanghai International Circuit, Shanghai, China	14–16 October	Chinese Grand Prix; Formula BMW Asia
7	Guia Circuit, Macau	17–20 November	Macau Grand Prix; World Touring Car Championship; Asian Touring Car Series

== Teams and drivers ==
All entrants utilised Porsche 911 GT3 Cup Type 996 cars.

Team	No.	Driver	Class	Rounds
A-Ha Racing	1	(Hong Kong) Matthew Marsh		All
Porsche Asia Pacific	3	(Hong Kong) Marchy Lee		7
Porsche Asia Pacific	21	(Thailand) Jak Chamikorn	B	1
Porsche Asia Pacific	63	(Thailand) Manit Vravut		1
Porsche Asia Pacific	63	(Japan) Hideki Hirota	B	7
Porsche Asia Pacific	83	(France) Jerome Haslin		1
A1 Racing Team	6	(Sri Lanka) Dilantha Malagamuwa		All
William E. Connor II	8	(Hong Kong) William E. Connor II	B	All
William Heinecke Racing	11	(Hong Kong) Alain Li	B	1–2, 4–7
William Heinecke Racing	11	(Thailand) William Heinecke	B	3
Porsche Motorsport Sweden	17	(Sweden) Nicklas Karlsson		1
SCC Racing Team	18	(Thailand) Vutthikorn Inthraphuvasak		All
SCC Racing Team	36	(Thailand) Nattavude Charoensukawattana		All
GR Asia	19	(Germany) Sven Herberger		1
GR Asia	19	(United Kingdom) Richard Meins	B	7
GR Asia	20	(United Kingdom) Danny Watts		1–2
GR Asia	20	(New Zealand) Rob Wilson		7
GR Asia	21	(South Korea) Gene Lee		2
GR Asia	42	(Hong Kong) Nicholas Thomas	B	7
Team Thailand	28	(Thailand) Sontaya Kunplome	B	All
GruppeM Racing	38	(United Kingdom) Jonathan Cocker		All
Jaseri Racing Team	55	(Malaysia) Rizal Ramli		1–4
Team Jebsen	88	(Hong Kong) Darryl O'Young		All
Eurokars Racing	89	(United Kingdom) Nigel Albon		All
Bloomberg	98	(Hong Kong) Philip Ma	B	1–2, 4, 6–7
Bloomberg	98	(Hong Kong) Patrick Ma	B	3, 5

Icon	Class
B	B Class
	Guest Starter

== Championship standings ==
=== Scoring system ===
Points were awarded to the top fifteen classified drivers in every race, using the following system:

Position	1st	2nd	3rd	4th	5th	6th	7th	8th	9th	10th	11th	12th	13th	14th	15th
Points	20	18	16	14	12	10	9	8	7	6	5	4	3	2	1

=== Overall ===
Pos.	Driver	SEP1 (Malaysia)	SEP2 (Malaysia)		BIR (Thailand)		BEI (China)		TAE (South Korea)		SHA (China)	MAC (Macau)	Points
1	(United Kingdom) Jonathan Cocker	4	1	3	6	7	2	2	1	2	1	5	177
2	(Thailand) Nattavude Charoensukawattana	3	3	1	1	1	4	4	2	1	Ret	2	176
3	(Hong Kong) Darryl O'Young	2	10	4	3	5	1	1	3	4	3	1	172
4	(Hong Kong) Matthew Marsh	1	4	5	4	6	5	3	4	3	2	3	162
5	(Thailand) Vutthikorn Inthraphuvasak	5	2	2	7	4	6	6			4		105
6	(Sri Lanka) Dilantha Malagamuwa	Ret	7	8	8	8	7	7	7	7	5	8	93
7	(Hong Kong) Alain Li	6	6	9			8	8	6	6	6	13	81
8	(United Kingdom) Nigel Albon	Ret	Ret	6	5	2	Ret	5	5	5	DNS	Ret	76
9	(Hong Kong) William E. Connor II	Ret	8	11	9	11	9	10	8	8	8	11	72
10	(Malaysia) Rizal Ramli	Ret	5	7	2	3	3	Ret					71
11	(Thailand) Sontaya Kunplome	8	9	12	12	12	11	11	9	9	9	14	65
12	(Hong Kong) Philip Ma	7	Ret	10			10	9			7	12	46
13	(Hong Kong) Patrick Ma				11	9							12
14	(Thailand) William Heinecke				10	10							12
Guest drivers ineligible for points
-	(Hong Kong) Marchy Lee											4	0
-	(United Kingdom) Danny Watts			6									0
-	(Japan) Hideki Hirota											6	0
-	(United Kingdom) Richard Meins											7	0
-	(South Korea) Gene Lee			8									0
-	(New Zealand) Rob Wilson											9	0
-	(Hong Kong) Nicholas Thomas											10	0
Pos.	Driver	SEP1 (Malaysia)	SEP2 (Malaysia)		BIR (Thailand)		BEI (China)		TAE (South Korea)		SHA (China)	MAC (Macau)	Points

=== Class B ===
Pos.	Driver	SEP1 (Malaysia)	SEP2 (Malaysia)		BIR (Thailand)		BEI (China)		TAE (South Korea)		SHA (China)	MAC (Macau)	Points
1	(Hong Kong) Alain Li	6	6	9			8	8	6	6	6	13	81
2	(Hong Kong) William E. Connor II	Ret	8	11	9	11	9	10	8	8	8	11	72
3	(Thailand) Sontaya Kunplome	8	9	12	12	12	11	11	9	9	9	14	65
4	(Hong Kong) Philip Ma	7	Ret	10			10	9			7	12	46
5	(Hong Kong) Patrick Ma				11	9							12
6	(Thailand) William Heinecke				10	10							12
Guest drivers ineligible for points
-	(Japan) Hideki Hirota											6	0
-	(United Kingdom) Richard Meins											7	0
-	(Hong Kong) Nicholas Thomas											10	0
Pos.	Driver	SEP1 (Malaysia)	SEP2 (Malaysia)		BIR (Thailand)		BEI (China)		TAE (South Korea)		SHA (China)	MAC (Macau)	Points

== See also ==
- 2005 Porsche Supercup
- 2005 Porsche Carrera Cup Germany
- 2005 Porsche Carrera Cup Great Britain
- 2005 Australian Carrera Cup Championship
