= 2004 Porsche Carrera Cup Asia =

Motorsport racing season

The 2004 Porsche Carrera Cup Asia (known for commercial reasons as the 2004 Porsche Infineon Carrera Cup Asia) was the second season of the Porsche Carrera Cup Asia. The season commenced on March 21 at the Sepang International Circuit and finished at the Guia Circuit on November 21.

After a strong finish to the season, Matthew Marsh won the championship after reining in season-long points leader, Nattavude Charoensukawattana. Taiwanese driver Max Chen became the inaugural champion of the newly-founded Class B championship.

== Calendar ==
The following venues hosted at least one round of the 2004 championship.

Round	Circuit	Date	Supporting
1	Sepang International Circuit, Selangor, Malaysia	19–21 March	Malaysian Grand Prix
2	Sepang International Circuit, Selangor, Malaysia	8–9 May	Asian Touring Car Series
3	Bira Circuit, Pattaya, Thailand	19–20 June	Asian Touring Car Series
4	Goldenport Park Circuit, Beijing, China	14–16 August	Formula BMW Asia; Asian Formula Three Championship; Asian Touring Car Series
5	Shanghai International Circuit, Shanghai, China	24–25 September	Chinese Grand Prix; Formula BMW Asia; Asian Formula Renault Challenge
6	Taebaek Racing Park, Taebaek, South Korea	16–17 October	Formula BMW Asia
7	Guia Circuit, Macau	20–21 November	Macau Grand Prix; Asian Formula Renault Challenge

== Teams and drivers ==
All entrants utilised Porsche 911 GT3 Cup Type 996 cars.

Team	No.	Driver	Class	Rounds
Team Infineon-Nouvellus	1	(Hong Kong) Charles Kwan		All
MioTech	2	(Chinese Taipei) Scott Miau	B	2–7
The Pizza Company	3	(Thailand) William Heinecke	B	1–2, 4–7
The Pizza Company	3	(Thailand) Manit Vravut		3
The Pizza Company	77	(India) Anil Thadani	B	1
The Pizza Company	77	(Germany) Sven Herberger		3
The Pizza Company	77	(Hong Kong) William E. Connor II	B	6
Porsche Zentrum München	6	(Germany) Sebastian Zollhoefer		1
GruppeM Racing	8	(United Kingdom) Jonathan Cocker		5
Fuspeed Racing	13	(Thailand) Nattavude Charoensukawattana		All
Boro Racing	15	(Japan) Toshihide Hashimura	B	1–4, 7
Boro Racing	15	(Japan) Toshio Nakamura	B	5
Boro Racing	15	(Japan) Akira Hirakawa	B	6
Vutthikorn Inthraphuvasak	18	(Thailand) Vutthikorn Inthraphuvasak		All
Team IWS Holdings	19	(Sri Lanka) Dilantha Malagamuwa		All
Porsche Asia Pacific / Mobil 1	20	(Malaysia) Alex Yoong		5
Siu Tit Lung	22	(Hong Kong) Siu Tit Lung	B	4–6
Brian Saunders	23	(United Kingdom) Brian Saunders		1–2
A1 Racing Team	28	(Chinese Taipei) Max Chen	B	All
A-Ha Racing	33	(United Kingdom) Matthew Marsh		All
Crest Jaseri Racing Team	55	(Malaysia) Rizal Ramli		All
	66	(United Kingdom) Mark Goddard		1–2
	66	(Japan) Kenji Kawagoe	B	3
	66	(Hong Kong) Siu Yuk Lung	B	4–7
Team Jebsen	88	(Hong Kong) Darryl O'Young		All
Eurokars Racing	89	(Singapore) Ringo Chong		All
Patrick Ma	98	(Hong Kong) Philip Ma	B	1, 3–5, 7
Patrick Ma	98	(Hong Kong) Patrick Ma	B	2, 6
Alex Yan	99	(Hong Kong) Alex Yan	B	1, 5, 7

Icon	Class
B	B Class
	Guest Starter

== Championship standings ==
=== Scoring system ===
Points were awarded to the top fifteen classified drivers in every race, using the following system:

Position	1st	2nd	3rd	4th	5th	6th	7th	8th	9th	10th	11th	12th	13th	14th	15th
Points	20	18	16	14	12	10	9	8	7	6	5	4	3	2	1

=== Overall ===
Pos.	Driver	SEP1 (Malaysia)	SEP2 (Malaysia)		BIR (Thailand)		BEI (China)		SHA (China)	TAE (South Korea)		MAC (Macau)	Points
1	(United Kingdom) Matthew Marsh	4	2	7	4	4	1	1	5	1	1	2	179
2	(Thailand) Nattavude Charoensukawattana	3	1	2	2	3	4	5	1	2	6	4	176
3	(Hong Kong) Charles Kwan	2	3	1	3	2	Ret	6	2	4	3	3	162
4	(Malaysia) Rizal Ramli	1	Ret	5	1	1	Ret	3	3	6	2	1	152
5	(Hong Kong) Darryl O'Young	5	7	4	6	6	2	2	4	5	5	6	139
6	(Thailand) Vutthikorn Inthraphuvasak	6	5	3	7	7	3	4	6	3	4	5	138
7	(Singapore) Ringo Chen	8	4	6	8	8	8	8	Ret	7	8	7	90
8	(Chinese Taipei) Max Chen	12	12	9	11	9	5	9	8	8	10	9	75
9	(Sri Lanka) Dilantha Malagamuwa	7	6	DNS	Ret	Ret	6	7	7	9	7	Ret	63
10	(Hong Kong) Philip Ma	9			10	11	10	11	9			8	44
11	(Thailand) William Heinecke	Ret	11	11			7	12	11	10	12	13	41
12	(Chinese Taipei) Scott Miau		13	12	12	12	9	14	10	13	9	Ret	40
13	(Japan) Toshihide Hashimura	11	8	DNS	Ret	10	Ret	10				11	30
14	(Hong Kong) Siu Yuk Lung						11	13	12	11	11	12	26
15	(Germany) Sven Herberger				5	5							24
16	(United Kingdom) Mark Goddard	10	9	8									21
17	(Hong Kong) Patrick Ma		10	10						DNS	DNS		12
18	(Hong Kong) Alex Yan	13							13			10	12
19	(Hong Kong) Siu Tit Lung						12	Ret	15	12	Ret		9
20	(Thailand) Manit Vravut				9	Ret							7
21	(Japan) Toshio Nakamura								14				2
22	(United Kingdom) Brian Saunders	Ret	Ret	DNS									0
23	(Japan) Kenji Kawagoe				Ret	Ret							0
24	(Germany) Sebastian Zollhoefer	Ret											0
25	(India) Anil Thadani	Ret											0
Pos.	Driver	SEP1 (Malaysia)	SEP2 (Malaysia)		BIR (Thailand)		BEI (China)		SHA (China)	TAE (South Korea)		MAC (Macau)	Points

=== Class B ===
Pos.	Driver	SEP1 (Malaysia)	SEP2 (Malaysia)		BIR (Thailand)		BEI (China)		SHA (China)	TAE (South Korea)		MAC (Macau)	Points
1	(Chinese Taipei) Max Chen	3	4	1	2	1	1	1	1	1	2	2	71
2	(Thailand) William Heinecke	Ret	3	3			2	4	4	2	4	6	41
3	(Chinese Taipei) Scott Miau		5	4	3	4	3	6	3	5	1	Ret	40
4	(Hong Kong) Philip Ma	1			1	3	4	3	2			1	39
5	(Japan) Toshihide Hashimura	2	1	DNS	Ret	2	Ret	2				4	30
6	(Hong Kong) Siu Yuk Lung						5	5	5	3	3	5	25
7	(Hong Kong) Siu Tit Lung						6	Ret	8	4	Ret		9
8	(Hong Kong) Alex Yan	4							6			3	9
9	(Hong Kong) Patrick Ma		2	2						DNS	DNS		6
10	(Japan) Toshio Nakamura								7				2
11	(Japan) Kenji Kawagoe				Ret	Ret							0
12	(India) Anil Thadani	Ret											0
Pos.	Driver	SEP1 (Malaysia)	SEP2 (Malaysia)		BIR (Thailand)		BEI (China)		SHA (China)	TAE (South Korea)		MAC (Macau)	Points

== See also ==
- 2004 Porsche Supercup
