= 2003 Porsche Carrera Cup Asia =

Motorsport racing season

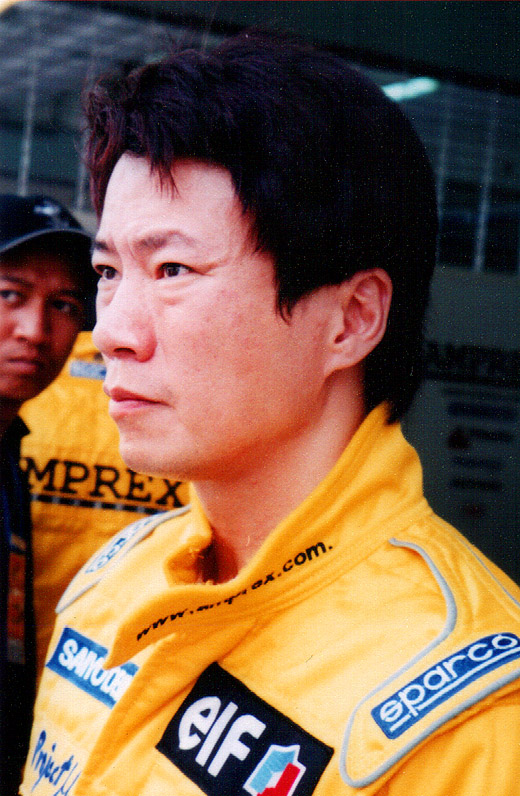
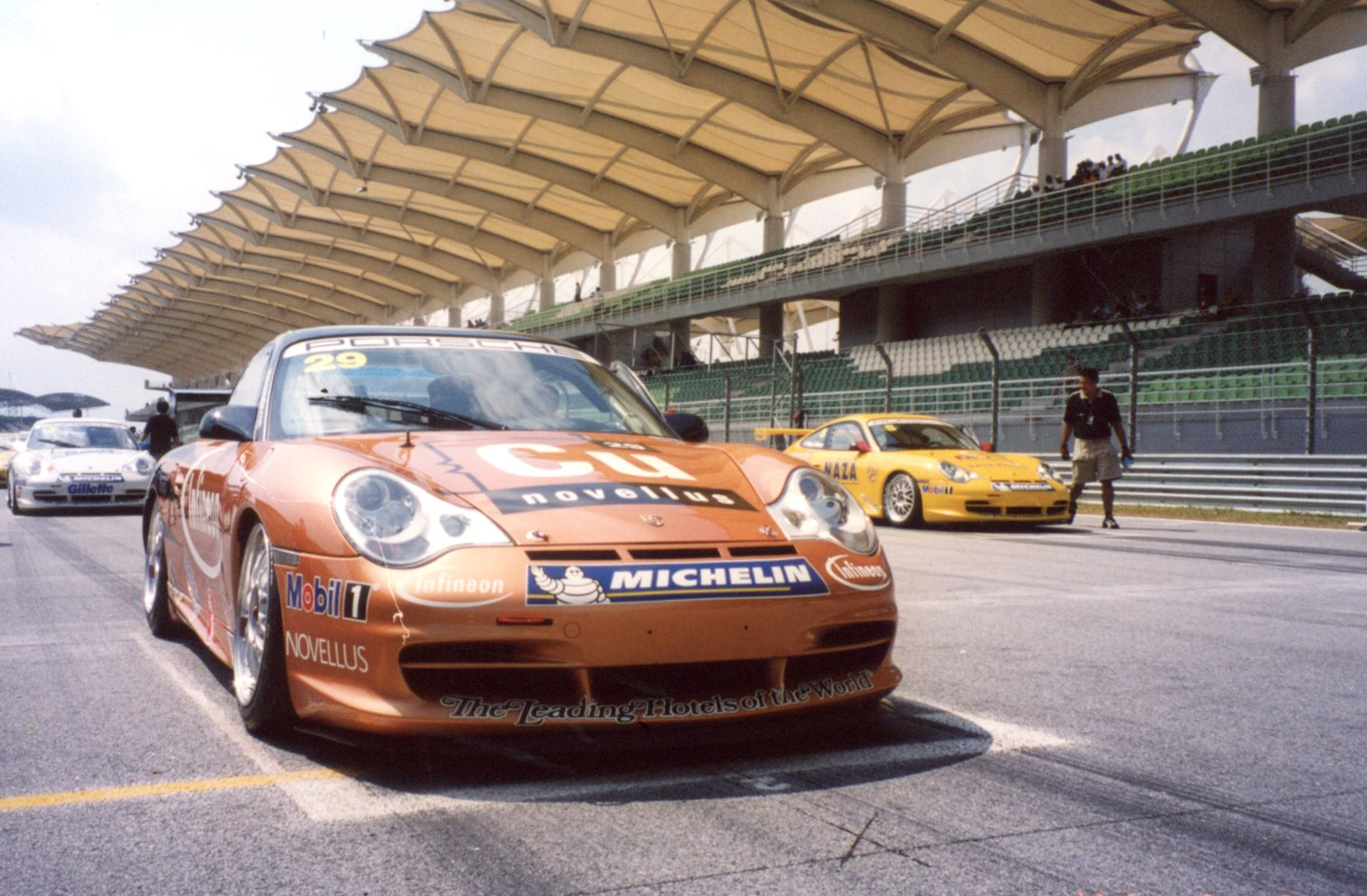
Charles Kwan won the inaugural Porsche Carrera Cup Asia championship.

The 2003 Porsche Carrera Cup Asia was the inaugural season of the Porsche Carrera Cup Asia. The season commenced on March 21 at the Sepang International Circuit and finished at the Guia Circuit on November 17. All entrants utilized Porsche 911 GT3 Cup Type 996 cars that were prevalent in other Carrera Cup competitions across the globe.

Hong Kong driver Charles Kwan became the inaugural champion, narrowly beating out Briton Nigel Albon by four points for the title. Thai driver Nattavude Charoensukawattana featured strongly throughout the majority of the season. However, a string of bad results in the final three races of the season ruled him out of contention heading into the finale in Macau.

== Calendar ==
The following venues hosted at least one round of the 2003 championship. Each round held two races, with the exception of the first round at Sepang and the final round at Macau which held only one.

Round	Circuit	Date	Supporting
1	Sepang International Circuit, Selangor, Malaysia	21–23 March	Malaysian Grand Prix; Formula BMW Asia
2	Sepang International Circuit, Selangor, Malaysia	7–8 June	Formula BMW Asia; Asian Touring Car Series
3	Johor Circuit, Johor, Malaysia	28–29 June	Formula BMW Asia; Asian Touring Car Series
4	Bira Circuit, Pattaya, Thailand	19–20 July	Formula BMW Asia; Asian Formula Three Championship; Asian Touring Car Series
5	Taebaek Racing Park, Taebaek, South Korea	23–24 August	Formula BMW Asia; Asian Touring Car Series
6	Goldenport Park Circuit, Beijing, China	25–26 October	Formula BMW Asia; Asian Formula Three Championship; Asian Touring Car Series
7	Guia Circuit, Macau	15–17 November	Macau Grand Prix

== Teams and drivers ==
All entrants utilised Porsche 911 GT3 Cup Type 996 cars.

Team	No.	Driver	Rounds
The Pizza Company	3	(Thailand) William Heinecke	All
The Pizza Company	77	(United Kingdom) Matthew Marsh	1, 7
The Pizza Company	77	(India) Anil Thadani	2, 4
Lai Yuk Shing	7	(Hong Kong) Lai Yuk Shing	1–2, 4, 6–7
Naza Racing Team	8	(United Kingdom) Nigel Albon	All
Naza Racing Team	10	(Malaysia) Tunku Hammam	1–3, 6–7
Toby Venter	9	(South Africa) Toby Venter	1–4
Porsche Bangkok / Red Bull	11	(Thailand) Chonsawat Asavahame	All
Porsche Bangkok / Red Bull	18	(Thailand) Vutthikorn Inthraphuvasak	1–4, 6–7
Fuspeed Racing	13	(Thailand) Nattavude Charoensukawattana	All
Porsche Asia Pacific	20	(Malaysia) A. Omar	1
Porsche Asia Pacific	21	(Hong Kong) Aaron Kwok	1
Porsche Asia Pacific	21	(Thailand) Sontaya Kunplome	4
Porsche Asia Pacific	21	(Malaysia) Alex Yoong	7
LKM Racing Team	22	(Hong Kong) Siu Tit Lung	All
LKM Racing Team	33	(Hong Kong) Siu Yuk Lung	All
A1 Racing Team	28	(Chinese Taipei) Max Chen	All
A1 Racing Team	66	(Chinese Taipei) Wang Shuo-I	1, 3–5
A1 Racing Team	66	(Chinese Taipei) Simon Lee	7
Team Infineon-Novellus	29	(Hong Kong) Charles Kwan	All
Jaseri Racing	55	(Malaysia) Tommy Lee	All
Kevin Wong	88	(Hong Kong) Kevin Wong	1–2
Kenji Kawagoe	88	(Japan) Kenji Kawagoe	4
Philip Ma Racing	98	(Hong Kong) Patrick Ma	1
Philip Ma Racing	98	(Hong Kong) Philip Ma	2, 6–7
Gieves & Hawkes	99	(Hong Kong) Alex Yan	All

Icon	Class
	Guest Starter

== Championship standings ==
Pos.	Driver	SEP1 (Malaysia)	SEP2 (Malaysia)		JOH (Malaysia)		BIR (Thailand)		TAE (South Korea)		BEI (China)		MAC (Macau)	Points
1	(Hong Kong) Charles Kwan	1	Ret	3	3	1	1	1	1	1	2	2	2	208
2	(United Kingdom) Nigel Albon	2	3	1	2	2	8	5	2	2	1	1	4	204
3	(Thailand) Nattavude Charoensukawattana	3	1	2	1	3	2	2	3	3	Ret	DNS	Ret	158
4	(Malaysia) Tommy Lee	9	5	5	6	6	5	6	4	4	4	7	7	137
5	(Thailand) Vutthikorn Inthraphuvasak	5	4	4	4	5	14	4			3	3	5	132
6	(Thailand) Chonsawat Asavahame	8	7	11	7	8	3	Ret	5	Ret	Ret	4	6	96
7	(Hong Kong) Siu Yuk Lung	10	12	8	11	9	7	7	9	7	7	8	14	86
8	(South Africa) Toby Venter	18	2	10	5	4	4	3						82
9	(Malaysia) Tunku Hammam	6	8	6	10	7					6	6	12	71
10	(Thailand) William Heinecke	17	14	15	Ret	10	10	9	8	8	8	10	13	60
11	(Hong Kong) Alex Yan	11	9	14	9	12	Ret	10	10	9	Ret	DNS	8	55
12	(Chinese Taipei) Max Chen	16	13	13	8	13	6	Ret	6	6	Ret	Ret	15	54
13	(Hong Kong) Tit Siu Lung	Ret	Ret	DNS	12	Ret	11	8	7	5	9	9		52
14	(Hong Kong) Philip Ma		10	9							5	5	11	44
15	(Hong Kong) Lai Yuk Shing	13	11	12			9	DNS			10	11	10	40
16	(Hong Kong) Kevin Wong	7	6	7										29
17	(Chinese Taipei) Wang Shuo-I	19			13	11	12	11	11	Ret				23
18	(India) Anil Thadani		15	16			13	12						8
Guest drivers ineligible for points
	(Malaysia) Alex Yoong												1	0
	(United Kingdom) Matthew Marsh	4											3	0
	(Hong Kong) Aaron Kwok	12												0
	(Hong Kong) Patrick Ma	14												0
	(Malaysia) A. Omar	15												0
Pos.	Driver	SEP1 (Malaysia)	SEP2 (Malaysia)		JOH (Malaysia)		BIR (Thailand)		TAE (South Korea)		BEI (China)		MAC (Macau)	Points

== See also ==
- 2003 Porsche Supercup
- 2003 Porsche Carrera Cup Germany
- 2003 Porsche Carrera Cup Great Britain
- 2003 Australian Carrera Cup Championship
