= 2006 Porsche Carrera Cup Asia =

Motorsport racing season

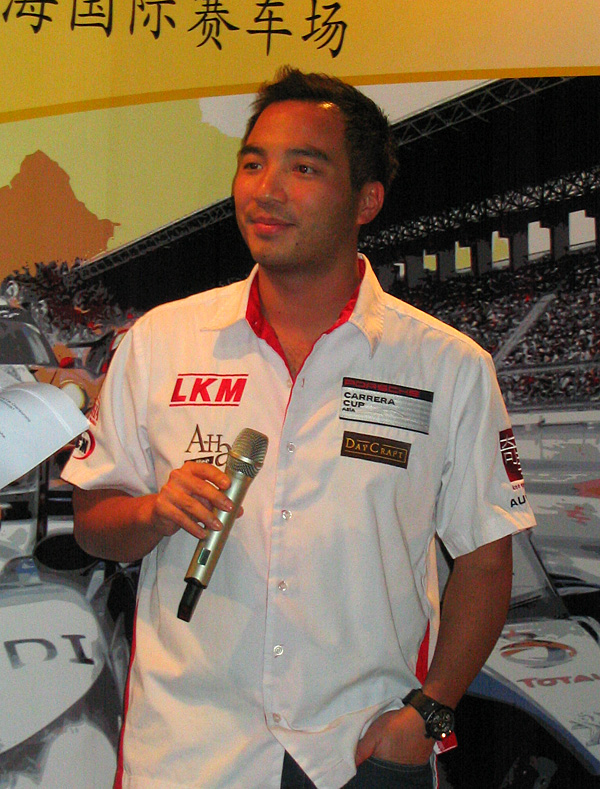
Darryl O'Young won his first Porsche Carrera Cup Asia championship

The 2006 Porsche Carrera Cup Asia was the fourth season of the Porsche Carrera Cup Asia. The season commenced on March 17 at the Sepang International Circuit and finished at the Guia Circuit on November 19. This year saw the introduction of the new 997 GT3 Cup car which replaced the outgoing Type 996 that had been run since the series' inception in 2003.

The season was dominated by Darryl O'Young who secured the championship with a round to spare. The Class B title was won by Australian Geoff Morgan.

== Calendar ==
The following venues hosted at least one round of the 2006 championship.

Round	Circuit	Date	Supporting
1	Sepang International Circuit, Selangor, Malaysia	17–19 March	Malaysian Grand Prix; Formula BMW Asia
2	Sepang International Circuit, Selangor, Malaysia	14–16 April	Stand-alone event
3	Goldenport Park Circuit, Beijing, China	10–11 June	Formula BMW Asia; Asian Touring Car Series
4	Sentul International Circuit, Sentul City, Indonesia	22–23 July	Formula BMW Asia; Asian Touring Car Series
5	Shanghai International Circuit, Shanghai, China	29 September–1 October	Chinese Grand Prix; Formula BMW Asia
6	Zhuhai International Circuit, Zhuhai, China	21–22 October	Formula BMW Asia; Asian Touring Car Series; Formula V6 Asia by Renault Series
7	Guia Circuit, Macau	18–19 November	Macau Grand Prix; World Touring Car Championship

== Teams and drivers ==
Team	No.	Driver	Class	Rounds
Tomo Racing	2	(Japan) Kazuyuki Nishizawa		All
Tomo Racing	3	(Japan) Shinichi Yamaji		All
Team Vertu	5	(United Kingdom) Nigel Albon		All
Team Hayashi	6	(Sri Lanka) Dilantha Malagamuwa		All
Rusty French Racing	7	(Australia) Rusty French	B	All
William E. Connor II	8	(Hong Kong) William E. Connor II	B	All
Gates GR Asia	9	(United Kingdom) Danny Watts		1, 7
Gates GR Asia	33	(Hong Kong) Matthew Marsh		All
Sunseeker Asia	11	(Hong Kong) Alain Li		1–2, 4–5, 7
Turn1 Motorsport Asia	14	(Spain) Ricardo H. Proost	B	All
Boro Racing	15	(Japan) Toshiya Ichiraku	B	1, 6
Boro Racing	15	(Japan) Toshihide Hashimura	B	2
Boro Racing	15	(Japan) Fumihiko Watanabe	B	3
Boro Racing	15	(Japan) Kimihiro Yashiro	B	4, 7
Boro Racing	15	(Japan) Akira Hirakawa		5
SCC Racing Team	18	(Thailand) Vutthikorn Inthraphuvasak		All
SCC Racing Team	36	(Thailand) Nattavude Charoensukawattana		1–4, 6–7
A1 Racing Team	28	(Chinese Taipei) Max Chen	B	1–4, 6–7
EKS Motorsport	41	(Australia) Geoff Morgan	B	2–7
Peter Boylan	77	(Australia) Peter Boylan	B	1, 3–4, 6–7
Cref Motorsport	80	(Japan) Keita Sawa		All
Team Jebsen	88	(Hong Kong) Darryl O'Young		All
Philip Ma Racing	98	(Hong Kong) Philip Ma	B	1, 3–7
Philip Ma Racing	98	(Hong Kong) Patrick Ma	B	2

Icon	Class
B	B Class
	Guest Starter

== Championship standings ==
=== Scoring system ===
Points were awarded to the top fifteen classified drivers in every race, using the following system:

Position	1st	2nd	3rd	4th	5th	6th	7th	8th	9th	10th	11th	12th	13th	14th	15th
Points	20	18	16	14	12	10	9	8	7	6	5	4	3	2	1

=== Overall ===
Pos.	Driver	SEP1 (Malaysia)		SEP2 (Malaysia)		BEI (China)		SEN (Indonesia)		SHA (China)	ZHU (China)		MAC (Macau)	Points
1	(Hong Kong) Darryl O'Young	1	4	1	1	1	1	3	4	2	1	1	4	218
2	(Japan) Shinichi Yamaji	3	1	5	4	4	4	1	1	1	3	12	3	188
3	(Japan) Keita Sawa	4	Ret	2	5	3	3	2	2	5	2	2	2	162
4	(Hong Kong) Matthew Marsh	6	3	3	2	2	2	7	8	4	Ret	6	Ret	137
5	(Thailand) Nattavude Charoensukawattana	2	5	6	9	9	6	4	3		6	4	7	128
6	(Japan) Kazuyuki Nishizawa	7	6	7	3	5	7	16	Ret	3	4	3	Ret	111
7	(United Kingdom) Nigel Albon	5	2	4	6	Ret	DNS	6	5	Ret	7	5	6	109
8	(Thailand) Vutthikorn Inthraphuvasak	8	7	13	7	Ret	DNS	5	6	6	5	Ret	5	87
9	(Sri Lanka) Dilantha Malagamuwa	9	8	8	8	7	5	10	9	7	Ret	7	Ret	83
10	(Australia) Geoff Morgan			10	Ret	6	8	9	10	8	8	8	12	66
11	(Australia) Rusty French	13	11	14	11	15	10	12	11	10	9	Ret	14	47
12	(Hong Kong) Alain Li	Ret	9	9	10			8	7	9			Ret	44
13	(Hong Kong) Philip Ma	15	14			8	11	13	13	15	10	10	9	43
14	(Spain) Ricardo H. Proost	16	12	16	15	13	12	11		13	11	9	8	41
15	(Hong Kong) William E. Connor II	11	13	12	14	12	13	14	14	12	Ret	11	11	40
16	(Australia) Peter Boylan	14	15			11	14	15	15		13	Ret	10	22
17	(Chinese Taipei) Max Chen	10	Ret	Ret	12	14	Ret			12	14	Ret	Ret	18
18	(Japan) Fumihiko Watanabe					10	9			11				18
19	(Japan) Toshiya Ichiraku	12	10								Ret	Ret		10
20	(Japan) Kimihiro Yashiro								12				13	8
21	(Japan) Toshihide Hashimura			11	13									8
22	(Hong Kong) Patrick Ma			15	16									1
Guest drivers ineligible for points
-	(United Kingdom) Danny Watts												1	0
Pos.	Driver	SEP1 (Malaysia)		SEP2 (Malaysia)		BEI (China)		SEN (Indonesia)		SHA (China)	ZHU (China)		MAC (Macau)	Points

=== Class B ===
Pos.	Driver	SEP1 (Malaysia)		SEP2 (Malaysia)		BEI (China)		SEN (Indonesia)		SHA (China)	ZHU (China)		MAC (Macau)	Points
1	(Australia) Geoff Morgan			10	Ret	6	8	9	10	8	8	8	11	66
2	(Australia) Rusty French	13	11	14	11	15	10	12	11	10	9	Ret	13	47
3	(Hong Kong) Philip Ma	15	14			8	11	13	13	15	10	10	8	43
4	(Spain) Ricardo H. Proost	16	12	16	15	13	12	11		13	11	9	7	41
5	(Hong Kong) William E. Connor II	11	13	12	14	12	13	14	14	12	Ret	11	10	40
6	(Australia) Peter Boylan	14	15			11	14	15	15		13	Ret	9	22
7	(Chinese Taipei) Max Chen	10	Ret	Ret	12	14	Ret			12	14	Ret	Ret	18
8	(Japan) Fumihiko Watanabe					10	9			11				18
9	(Japan) Toshiya Ichiraku	12	10								Ret	Ret		10
10	(Japan) Kimihiro Yashiro							17	12				12	8
11	(Japan) Toshihide Hashimura			11	13									8
12	(Hong Kong) Patrick Ma			15	16									1
Pos.	Driver	SEP1 (Malaysia)		SEP2 (Malaysia)		BEI (China)		SEN (Indonesia)		SHA (China)	ZHU (China)		MAC (Macau)	Points

== See also ==
- 2006 Porsche Supercup
