= 2007 Porsche Carrera Cup Asia =

Motorsport racing season

The 2007 Porsche Carrera Cup Asia was the fifth season of the Porsche Carrera Cup Asia. The season commenced on April 6 at the Sepang International Circuit and finished at the Guia Circuit on November 18.

The championship was won by Tim Sugden of GruppeM Racing. Class B honours were secured by Weng Mok Sun.

== Calendar ==
The following venues hosted at least one round of the 2007 championship.

| Round | Circuit | Date | Supporting |
|---|---|---|---|
| 1 | Sepang International Circuit, Selangor, Malaysia | 6–8 April | Malaysian Grand Prix |
| 2 | Sepang International Circuit, Selangor, Malaysia | 5 May | Formula BMW Asia; Asian Touring Car Series; Formula Renault V6 Asia Championship |
| 3 | Sentul International Circuit, Sentul City, Indonesia | 22 July | Formula BMW Asia; Asian Touring Car Series; Formula Renault V6 Asia Championship |
| 4 | Chengdu Goldenport Circuit, Chengdu, China | 15–16 September | Formula BMW Asia; Asian Touring Car Series; Formula Renault V6 Asia Championship |
| 5 | Shanghai International Circuit, Shanghai, China | 5–7 October | Chinese Grand Prix; Formula BMW Asia |
| 6 | Zhuhai International Circuit, Zhuhai, China | 3–4 November | Formula BMW Asia; Asian Touring Car Series; Formula Renault V6 Asia Championship |
| 7 | Guia Circuit, Macau | 17–18 November | Macau Grand Prix; World Touring Car Championship |

== Teams and drivers ==
| Team | No. | Driver | Class | Rounds |
|---|---|---|---|---|
| Team Vertu | 5 | (United Kingdom) Nigel Albon | | All |
| Team Hayashi | 6 | (Sri Lanka) Dilantha Malagamuwa | | All |
| Team PCS Racing | 7 | (Singapore) Ian Mao Tan | B | 1–2 |
| Team PCS Racing | 33 | (Singapore) Weng Sun Mok | B | All |
| William E. Connor II | 8 | (Hong Kong) William E. Connor II | B | All |
| Sunseeker Asia | 11 | (Hong Kong) Alain Li | | All |
| KK Motors | 13 | (Hong Kong) Marchy Lee | | 3, 5–7 |
| Turn1 Motorsport Asia | 14 | (Spain) Ricardo H. Proost | B | 1 |
| | 15 | (Malaysia) Tunku Hammam | | All |
| SCC Racing China | 18 | (Thailand) Vutthikorn Inthraphuvasak | | 1–2 |
| SCC Racing China | 36 | (Australia) Christian Jones | | All |
| | 22 | (Hong Kong) Siu Yuk Lung | B | 1, 5, 7 |
| | 22 | (Hong Kong) Siu Tit Lung | B | 2, 6 |
| Talent2 | 41 | (Australia) Geoff Morgan | | All |
| Team Jebsen | 55 | (Hong Kong) Darryl O'Young | | 5, 7 |
| ThunderAsia Racing | 69 | (Singapore) Melvin Choo | B | All |
| Boylan Motorsports | 77 | (Australia) Peter Boylan | B | All |
| Cref Motorsports | 80 | (Japan) Keita Sawa | | All |
| GruppeM Racing | 88 | (United Kingdom) Tim Sugden | | All |
| Philip Ma Racing | 98 | (Hong Kong) Philip Ma | B | All |

| Icon | Class |
|---|---|
| B | B Class |
| | Guest Starter |

== Championship standings ==
=== Scoring system ===
Points were awarded to the top fifteen classified drivers in every race, using the following system:

| Position | 1st | 2nd | 3rd | 4th | 5th | 6th | 7th | 8th | 9th | 10th | 11th | 12th | 13th | 14th | 15th |
| Points | 20 | 18 | 16 | 14 | 12 | 10 | 9 | 8 | 7 | 6 | 5 | 4 | 3 | 2 | 1 |

=== Overall ===
| Pos. | Driver | SEP1 (Malaysia) | | SEP2 (Malaysia) | | SEN (Indonesia) | | CHE (China) | | SHA (China) | | ZHU (China) | | MAC (Macau) | Points |
|---|---|---|---|---|---|---|---|---|---|---|---|---|---|---|---|
| 1 | (United Kingdom) Tim Sugden | 1 | 1 | 1 | 4 | 1 | 14 | 2 | 3 | 1 | 1 | 3 | 4 | 4 | 214 |
| 2 | (Japan) Keita Sawa | 3 | 2 | 5 | 1 | 2 | 2 | 3 | 2 | 4 | 4 | Ret | 3 | 1 | 200 |
| 3 | (Australia) Christian Jones | 2 | 3 | 2 | Ret | 3 | 1 | 1 | 1 | 3 | 2 | 2 | 2 | Ret | 198 |
| 4 | (United Kingdom) Nigel Albon | 4 | 5 | 4 | 3 | 7 | 4 | 4 | 4 | Ret | 5 | 4 | 6 | 3 | 159 |
| 5 | (Australia) Geoff Morgan | 8 | 7 | 8 | 5 | 8 | 7 | 6 | 6 | 6 | 7 | 6 | 5 | 7 | 124 |
| 6 | (Hong Kong) Marchy Lee | | | | | 4 | 3 | | | 2 | 3 | 1 | 1 | 2 | 122 |
| 7 | (Sri Lanka) Dilantha Malagamuwa | 6 | 6 | 6 | 8 | 6 | 6 | Ret | 7 | 5 | 6 | 5 | Ret | 6 | 111 |
| 8 | (Singapore) Weng Sun Mok | 11 | 10 | 10 | 6 | 12 | 11 | 10 | 9 | 10 | 11 | 7 | 9 | 9 | 83 |
| 9 | (Hong Kong) Alain Li | Ret | 14 | 7 | Ret | 5 | 5 | 5 | 11 | 9 | 8 | Ret | DNS | 5 | 79 |
| 10 | (Australia) Peter Boylan | 9 | 8 | 11 | 11 | 9 | 8 | 7 | Ret | 12 | 12 | 11 | 12 | 8 | 74 |
| 11 | (Hong Kong) William E. Connor II | 7 | Ret | 9 | 9 | 10 | 10 | Ret | 10 | 8 | 9 | 8 | 10 | 12 | 74 |
| 12 | (Hong Kong) Philip Ma | 10 | 11 | 13 | 10 | 13 | 13 | 9 | 5 | 11 | 15 | 9 | 8 | 11 | 71 |
| 13 | (Thailand) Vutthikorn Inthraphuvasak | 5 | 4 | 3 | 2 | | | | | | | | | | 60 |
| 14 | (Malaysia) Tunku Hammam | Ret | Ret | 16 | 7 | 11 | 9 | 8 | 12 | 7 | 13 | Ret | 7 | 10 | 60 |
| 15 | (Singapore) Melvin Choo | 14 | 15 | 12 | 12 | 14 | 12 | 11 | 8 | 14 | 10 | 10 | 11 | 14 | 51 |
| 16 | (Singapore) Ian Mao Tan | 12 | 12 | 14 | 13 | | | | | | | | | | 13 |
| 17 | (Hong Kong) Siu Yuk Lung | 15 | 13 | | | | | | | 13 | 14 | | | 13 | 12 |
| 18 | (Spain) Ricardo H. Proost | 13 | 9 | | | | | | | | | | | | 10 |
| 19 | (Hong Kong) Siu Tit Lung | | | 15 | 14 | | | | | | | 12 | 13 | | 10 |
| Pos. | Driver | SEP1 (Malaysia) | | SEP2 (Malaysia) | | SEN (Indonesia) | | CHE (China) | | SHA (China) | | ZHU (China) | | MAC (Macau) | Points |

=== Class B ===
| Pos. | Driver | SEP1 (Malaysia) | | SEP2 (Malaysia) | | SEN (Indonesia) | | CHE (China) | | SHA (China) | | ZHU (China) | | MAC (Macau) | Points |
|---|---|---|---|---|---|---|---|---|---|---|---|---|---|---|---|
| 1 | (Singapore) Weng Sun Mok | 11 | 10 | 10 | 6 | 12 | 11 | 10 | 9 | 10 | 11 | 7 | 9 | 9 | 83 |
| 2 | (Australia) Peter Boylan | 9 | 8 | 11 | 11 | 9 | 8 | 7 | Ret | 12 | 12 | 11 | 12 | 8 | 74 |
| 3 | (Hong Kong) William E. Connor II | 7 | Ret | 9 | 9 | 10 | 10 | Ret | 10 | 8 | 9 | 8 | 10 | 12 | 74 |
| 4 | (Hong Kong) Philip Ma | 10 | 11 | 13 | 10 | 13 | 13 | 9 | 5 | 11 | 15 | 9 | 8 | 11 | 71 |
| 5 | (Malaysia) Tunku Hammam | Ret | Ret | 16 | 7 | 11 | 9 | 8 | 12 | 7 | 13 | Ret | 7 | 10 | 60 |
| 6 | (Singapore) Melvin Choo | 14 | 15 | 12 | 12 | 14 | 12 | 11 | 8 | 14 | 10 | 10 | 11 | 14 | 51 |
| 7 | (Singapore) Ian Mao Tan | 12 | 12 | 14 | 13 | | | | | | | | | | 13 |
| 8 | (Hong Kong) Siu Yuk Lung | 15 | 13 | | | | | | | 13 | 14 | | | 13 | 12 |
| 9 | (Spain) Ricardo H. Proost | 13 | 9 | | | | | | | | | | | | 10 |
| 10 | (Hong Kong) Siu Tit Lung | | | 15 | 14 | | | | | | | 12 | 13 | | 10 |
| Pos. | Driver | SEP1 (Malaysia) | | SEP2 (Malaysia) | | SEN (Indonesia) | | CHE (China) | | SHA (China) | | ZHU (China) | | MAC (Macau) | Points |

== See also ==
- 2007 Porsche Supercup
- 2007 Porsche Carrera Cup Germany
- 2007 Porsche Carrera Cup Great Britain
- 2007 Australian Carrera Cup Championship
