= 2005 Formula BMW Asia season =

Junior formula racing season

Seasons
- ← 2004 2006 →

The 2005 Formula BMW Asia season was the third season of the Asian Formula BMW championship for young drivers making the transition to car racing. Salman Al Khalifa was crowned a new champion while Michael Patrizi won the rookies' classification. Ahead of the season BMW opened a new BMW Performance Center near the Bahrain International Circuit. It was used for the evaluation and license courses for the Formula BMW scholarship ahead of the season.

== Teams and drivers ==
All cars were Mygale FB02 chassis powered by BMW engines.

Team	No	Driver	Class	Rounds
(Hong Kong) Minardi Team Asia	2	(Malaysia) Aaron Lim	R	2–7
(Hong Kong) Minardi Team Asia	3	(Bahrain) Abdulla Ebrahim Mattar	G	1
(Hong Kong) Minardi Team Asia	4	(Sri Lanka) Dejan de Zoysa	R	1–4
(Hong Kong) Minardi Team Asia	5	(Bahrain) Mohammed Al Baharna	G	1
(Hong Kong) Minardi Team Asia	22	(Hong Kong) Jonathan Chan		All
(South Korea) Team E-Rain	7	(Bahrain) Salman Al Khalifa		All
(South Korea) Team E-Rain	17	(India) Armaan Ebrahim	R	All
(South Korea) Team E-Rain	61	(South Korea) An Sukwon	R	All
(Macau) Ao's Racing Team	9	(China) Wang Jian-Wei	R	All
(Macau) Ao's Racing Team	20	(Hong Kong) Chia On	G	1–2
(Macau) Ao's Racing Team	23	(Macau) Ao Chi Hong	G	4, 6–7
(Macau) Ao's Racing Team	99	(China) Song Ge	G	1–2, 7
(Malaysia) Team Meritus	18	(China) Xu Jia	G	4
(Malaysia) Team Meritus	29	(Australia) Michael Patrizi	R	All
(Malaysia) Team Meritus	38	(Bahrain) Hamad Al Fardan		All
(Malaysia) Team Meritus	58	(Thailand) Robert Boughey		All
(Malaysia) Team Meritus	69	(Japan) Mitsunobu Endo		1–3, 5–7
(Malaysia) Team Meritus	88	(Malaysia) Ro Charlz	R	All
(Malaysia) Team Meritus	99	(Jordan) Hamza Dirani	G	6–7

Icon	Class
R	Rookie Cup
G	Guest drivers ineligible to score points

== Races ==
Round		Circuit	Date	Pole position	Fastest lap	Winning driver	Winning team	Winning rookie
1	R1	Bahrain International Circuit	2 April	(Bahrain) Salman Al Khalifa	(Bahrain) Hamad Al Fardan	(Bahrain) Salman Al Khalifa	(South Korea) Team E-Rain	(Malaysia) Ro Charlz
1	R2	Bahrain International Circuit	3 April	(Bahrain) Salman Al Khalifa	(Bahrain) Salman Al Khalifa	(Thailand) Robert Boughey	(Malaysia) Team Meritus	(India) Armaan Ebrahim
2	R1	(Malaysia) Sepang International Circuit	14 May	(Bahrain) Salman Al Khalifa	(Malaysia) Ro Charlz	(Bahrain) Salman Al Khalifa	(South Korea) Team E-Rain	(Malaysia) Ro Charlz
2	R2	(Malaysia) Sepang International Circuit	15 May	(Bahrain) Salman Al Khalifa	(Bahrain) Salman Al Khalifa	(India) Armaan Ebrahim	(South Korea) Team E-Rain	(India) Armaan Ebrahim
3	R1	(Thailand) Bira Circuit	11 June	(Australia) Michael Patrizi	(Australia) Michael Patrizi	(Bahrain) Hamad Al Fardan	(Malaysia) Team Meritus	(Australia) Michael Patrizi
3	R2	(Thailand) Bira Circuit	12 June	(Bahrain) Salman Al Khalifa	(Bahrain) Hamad Al Fardan	(Bahrain) Salman Al Khalifa	(South Korea) Team E-Rain	(Australia) Michael Patrizi
4	R1	(China) Goldenport Park Circuit	16 July	(Bahrain) Salman Al Khalifa	(Bahrain) Salman Al Khalifa	(Bahrain) Salman Al Khalifa	(South Korea) Team E-Rain	(Malaysia) Ro Charlz
4	R2	(China) Goldenport Park Circuit	17 July	(Bahrain) Salman Al Khalifa	(India) Armaan Ebrahim	(Bahrain) Hamad Al Fardan	(Malaysia) Team Meritus	(Australia) Michael Patrizi
5	R1	(South Korea) Taebaek Racing Park	6 August	(Malaysia) Ro Charlz	(Bahrain) Hamad Al Fardan	(Bahrain) Hamad Al Fardan	(Malaysia) Team Meritus	(Malaysia) Ro Charlz
5	R2	(South Korea) Taebaek Racing Park	7 August	(Malaysia) Ro Charlz	(Australia) Michael Patrizi	(Australia) Michael Patrizi	(Malaysia) Team Meritus	(Australia) Michael Patrizi
6	R1	(Japan) Autopolis	3 September	(Australia) Michael Patrizi	(Australia) Michael Patrizi	(Bahrain) Salman Al Khalifa	(South Korea) Team E-Rain	(Australia) Michael Patrizi
6	R2	(Japan) Autopolis	4 September	(Bahrain) Hamad Al Fardan	(Bahrain) Hamad Al Fardan	(Bahrain) Salman Al Khalifa	(South Korea) Team E-Rain	(Australia) Michael Patrizi
7	R1	(China) Shanghai International Circuit	15 October	(Bahrain) Hamad Al Fardan	(India) Armaan Ebrahim	(Bahrain) Hamad Al Fardan	(Malaysia) Team Meritus	(Malaysia) Ro Charlz
7	R2	(China) Shanghai International Circuit	16 October	(Australia) Michael Patrizi	(Australia) Michael Patrizi	(Australia) Michael Patrizi	(Malaysia) Team Meritus	(Australia) Michael Patrizi

== Standings ==
Points were awarded as follows:

Position	**1st**	**2nd**	**3rd**	**4th**	**5th**	**6th**	**7th**	**8th**	**9th**	**10th**
Points	20	15	12	10	8	6	4	3	2	1

=== Drivers' Championship ===
Pos	Driver	BHR (Bahrain)		SEP (Malaysia)		BIR (Thailand)		BEI (China)		TAE (South Korea)		AUT (Japan)		SIC (China)		Pts
1	(Bahrain) Salman Al Khalifa	**1**	**2**	**1**	**3**	10	**1**	**1**	**9**	6	Ret	1	1	5	5	172
2	(Australia) Michael Patrizi	3	7	Ret	7	**2**	3	8	2	4	1	**2**	2	4	**1**	157
3	(Bahrain) Hamad Al Fardan	4	14	2	13	1	2	2	1	1	Ret	Ret	**4**	**1**	9	148
4	(Malaysia) Ro Charlz	2	5	3	5	3	5	3	Ret	**2**	**2**	3	Ret	2	6	140
5	(India) Armaan Ebrahim	5	4	4	1	Ret	4	4	4	Ret	4	Ret	3	3	2	129
6	(Thailand) Robert Boughey	6	1	11	2	4	Ret	6	6	7	6	4	Ret	6	7	94
7	(South Korea) An Sukwon	7	6	7	6	6	7	5	3	3	Ret	5	6	9	4	90
8	(Malaysia) Aaron Lim			5	4	5	6	7	5	5	3	Ret	Ret	7	3	80
9	(Hong Kong) Jonathan Chan	11	Ret	9	9	8	9	12	8	9	5	9	5	8	8	41
10	(Japan) Mitsunobu Endo	9	9	10	10	7	10			8	Ret	6	8	14	11	27
11	(China) Wang Jian-Wei	8	11	6	11	9	11	10	Ret	10	Ret	Ret	9	10	12	19
12	(Sri Lanka) Dejan de Zoysa	10	8	Ret	8	Ret	8	9	7							17
Guest drivers ineligible to score points
–	(Bahrain) Mohammed Al Baharna	Ret	3													–
–	(Jordan) Hamza Dirani											7	7	11	10	–
–	(China) Song Ge	12	10	8	12									13	13	–
–	(Macau) Ao Chi Hong							13	11			8	Ret	12	DNS	–
–	(China) Xu Jia							11	10							–
–	(Hong Kong) Chia On	14	12	DNS	DNS											–
–	(Bahrain) Abdulla Ebrahim Mattar	13	13													–
Pos	Driver	BHR (Bahrain)		SEP (Malaysia)		BIR (Thailand)		BEI (China)		TAE (South Korea)		AUT (Japan)		SIC (China)		Pts

Colour	Result
Gold	Winner
Silver	Second place
Bronze	Third place
Green	Points classification
Blue	Non-points classification
Blue	Non-classified finish (NC)
Purple	Retired, not classified (Ret)
Red	Did not qualify (DNQ)
Red	Did not pre-qualify (DNPQ)
Black	Disqualified (DSQ)
White	Did not start (DNS)
White	Withdrew (WD)
White	Race cancelled (C)
Blank	Did not practice (DNP)
Blank	Did not arrive (DNA)
Blank	Excluded (EX)

**Bold** – Pole
Italics – Fastest Lap

=== Rookie Cup ===
Pos	Driver	BHR (Bahrain)		SEP (Malaysia)		BIR (Thailand)		BEI (China)		TAE (South Korea)		AUT (Japan)		SIC (China)		Pts
1	(Australia) Michael Patrizi	2	4	Ret	5	1	1	5	1	3	1	1	1	3	1	205
2	(Malaysia) Ro Charlz	1	2	1	3	2	3	1	Ret	1	2	2	Ret	1	5	192
3	(India) Armaan Ebrahim	3	1	2	1	Ret	2	2	3	Ret	4	Ret	2	2	2	164
4	(South Korea) An Sukwon	4	3	5	4	4	5	3	2	2	Ret	3	3	5	4	142
5	(Malaysia) Aaron Lim			3	2	3	4	4	4	4	3	Ret	Ret	4	3	113
6	(China) Wang Jian-Wei	5	6	4	7	5	7	7	Ret	5	Ret	Ret	4	6	6	74
7	(Sri Lanka) Dejan de Zoysa	6	5	Ret	6	Ret	6	6	5							40
