= 2004 Formula BMW Asia season =

Seasons
- ← 2003 2005 →

The 2004 Formula BMW Asia season was won by Marchy Lee of Hong Kong, driving for Team Meritus. Lee finished the season on 250 points, followed by BMW Junior driver, 24-year-old You Kyong-Ouk and Rookie Cup winner Mehdi Bennani), both on 124 points. Lee received an extra prize in recognition of his extraordinary achievements – a three-day test with the Team Rosberg Formula 3 outfit.

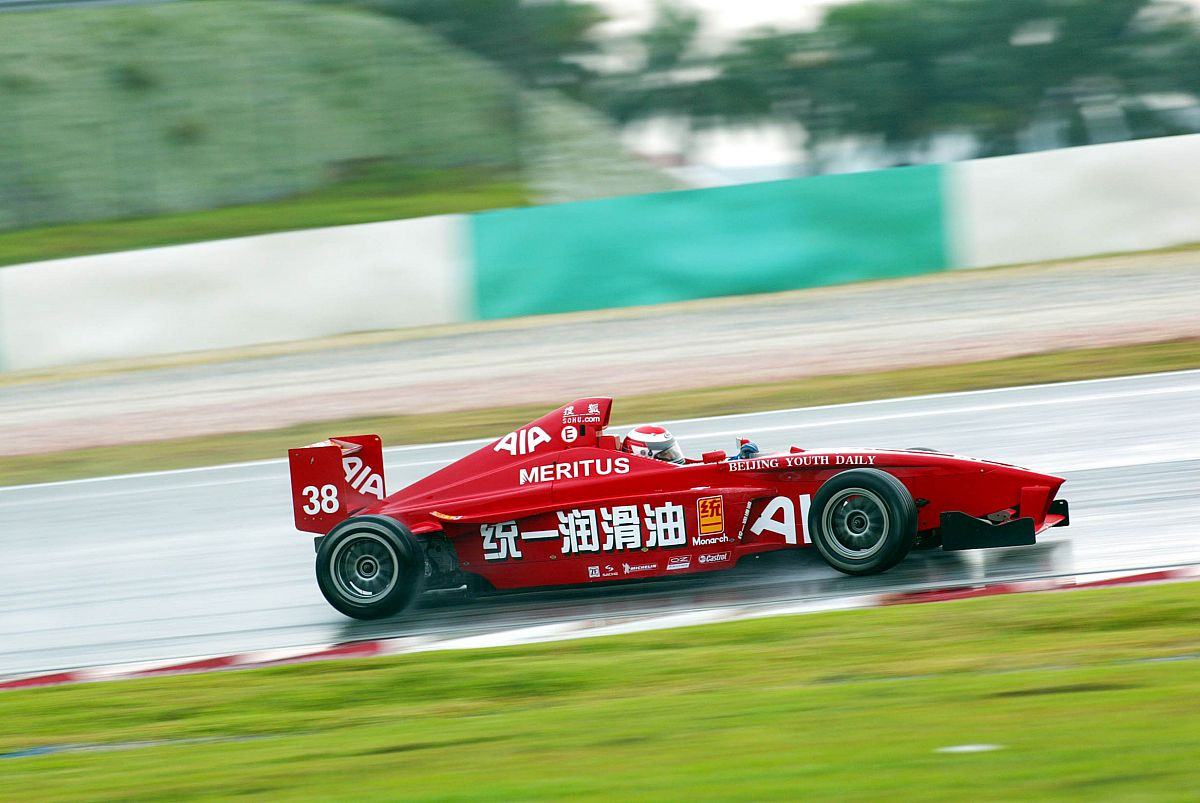
Champion Marchy Lee on a qualifying lap.

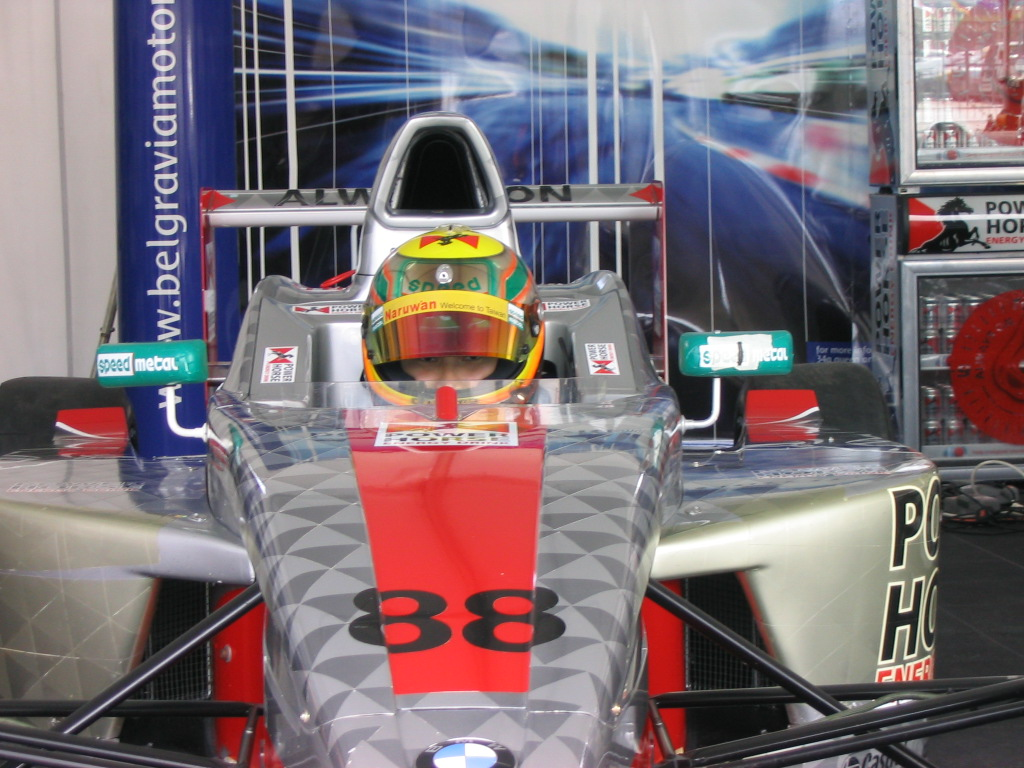
Hanss Lin finished 4th overall for Belgravia Motorsport.

== Teams and drivers ==
All cars were Mygale FB02 chassis powered by BMW engines.

Team	No	Driver	Class	Rounds
(Malaysia) Minardi Team Asia	2	(Philippines) Dado Pena		All
(Malaysia) Minardi Team Asia	3	(Philippines) Tyson Sy		All
(Malaysia) Minardi Team Asia	4	(Thailand) Robert Boughey	R	All
(Malaysia) Minardi Team Asia	5	(Indonesia) Moreno Soeprapto	G	1–4, 6
(Malaysia) Minardi Team Asia	27	(United Kingdom) Mark Goddard		5
(South Korea) Team E-Rain	6	(China) Han Han	R	All
(South Korea) Team E-Rain	7	(South Korea) Lee Kookhyun	G	7
(South Korea) Team E-Rain	12	(Philippines) Gaby Dela Merced	R	3–4
(South Korea) Team E-Rain	33	(Macau) Ao Chi Hong	G	6
(South Korea) Team E-Rain	61	(South Korea) You Kyongouk		All
(South Korea) Team E-Rain	62	(Malaysia) Karshana Dissanayake	G	1
(South Korea) Team E-Rain	68	(Hong Kong) Michael Ting	G	5
(South Korea) Team E-Rain	86	(Hong Kong) Michael Ting	G	6
(United Kingdom) Belgravia Motorsport	21	(Bahrain) Salman Al Khalifa		All
(United Kingdom) Belgravia Motorsport	22	(Bahrain) Mohammed Al Baharna		All
(United Kingdom) Belgravia Motorsport	23	(Bahrain) Hamad Al Fardan	R	All
(United Kingdom) Belgravia Motorsport	24	(Morocco) Mehdi Bennani	R	1
(United Kingdom) Belgravia Motorsport	88	(Chinese Taipei) Hanss Lin Po Heng		All
(Malaysia) Team Meritus	8	(Malaysia) Chin Tzer Jinn	G	2
(Malaysia) Team Meritus	11	(Malaysia) Nik Iruwan Nik Izani	R	All
(Malaysia) Team Meritus	24	(Morocco) Mehdi Bennani	R	2–7
(Malaysia) Team Meritus	38	(Hong Kong) Marchy Lee		All
(Malaysia) Team Meritus	15	(Hong Kong) Tobia Kipper	G	6
(Malaysia) Team Meritus	52	(United States) Mark Patterson	G	6
(Malaysia) Team Meritus	77	(Chinese Taipei) Kuo Chia-Ming	G	2
(Philippines) Team T.E.C Pilipinas	12	(Philippines) Gaby Dela Merced	R	1–2
(Thailand) Autosport with Arto	19	(Thailand) Maekkasit Weraporasu	R	1–3
(Thailand) Autosport with Arto	20	(Japan) Tohru Jitsukawa		1–2
(Philippines) San Miguel MP Turbo	33	(Philippines) Mike Potenciano	G	3

Icon	Class
R	Rookie Cup
G	Guest drivers ineligible to score points

== Races ==
Round		Circuit	Date	Pole position	Fastest lap	Winning driver	Winning team	Winning rookie
1	R1	Bahrain International Circuit	3 April	(Hong Kong) Marchy Lee	(Hong Kong) Marchy Lee	(Hong Kong) Marchy Lee	(Malaysia) Team Meritus	(Morocco) Mehdi Bennani
1	R2	Bahrain International Circuit	4 April	(Indonesia) Moreno Soeprapto	(Thailand) Maekkasit Weraporasu	(Hong Kong) Marchy Lee	(Malaysia) Team Meritus	(Morocco) Mehdi Bennani
2	R1	(Malaysia) Sepang International Circuit	19 June	(Chinese Taipei) Hanss Lin Po Heng	no data	(Hong Kong) Marchy Lee	(Malaysia) Team Meritus	(Bahrain) Hamad Al Fardan
2	R2	(Malaysia) Sepang International Circuit	19 June	(Hong Kong) Marchy Lee	no data	(Hong Kong) Marchy Lee	(Malaysia) Team Meritus	(Morocco) Mehdi Bennani
3	R1	(Thailand) Bira Circuit	10 July	(Hong Kong) Marchy Lee	no data	(Hong Kong) Marchy Lee	(Malaysia) Team Meritus	(Morocco) Mehdi Bennani
3	R2	(Thailand) Bira Circuit	11 July	(Chinese Taipei) Hanss Lin Po Heng	no data	(Hong Kong) Marchy Lee	(Malaysia) Team Meritus	(Morocco) Mehdi Bennani
4	R1	(China) Goldenport Park Circuit	15 August	(Hong Kong) Marchy Lee	(Morocco) Mehdi Bennani	(Hong Kong) Marchy Lee	(Malaysia) Team Meritus	(Morocco) Mehdi Bennani
4	R2	(China) Goldenport Park Circuit	16 August	(Hong Kong) Marchy Lee	(Chinese Taipei) Hanss Lin Po Heng	(Chinese Taipei) Hanss Lin Po Heng	(United Kingdom) Belgravia Motorsport	(Morocco) Mehdi Bennani
5	R1	(Japan) Autopolis	4 September	(Hong Kong) Marchy Lee	(Hong Kong) Marchy Lee	(Hong Kong) Marchy Lee	(Malaysia) Team Meritus	(Morocco) Mehdi Bennani
5	R2	(Japan) Autopolis	5 September	(Hong Kong) Marchy Lee	(Hong Kong) Marchy Lee	(Hong Kong) Marchy Lee	(Malaysia) Team Meritus	(Morocco) Mehdi Bennani
6	R1	(China) Shanghai International Circuit	25 September	(Hong Kong) Marchy Lee	(Philippines) Tyson Sy	(Hong Kong) Marchy Lee	(Malaysia) Team Meritus	(Bahrain) Hamad Al Fardan
6	R2	(China) Shanghai International Circuit	26 September	(Hong Kong) Marchy Lee	(Morocco) Mehdi Bennani	(Indonesia) Moreno Soeprapto	(Malaysia) Minardi Team Asia	(Malaysia) Nik Iruwan Nik Izani
7	R1	(South Korea) Taebaek Racing Park	16 October	(Hong Kong) Marchy Lee	(Bahrain) Hamad Al Fardan	(Hong Kong) Marchy Lee	(Malaysia) Team Meritus	(Bahrain) Hamad Al Fardan
7	R2	(South Korea) Taebaek Racing Park	17 October	(Hong Kong) Marchy Lee	(Hong Kong) Marchy Lee	(Hong Kong) Marchy Lee	(Malaysia) Team Meritus	(Morocco) Mehdi Bennani

== Standings ==
Points were awarded as follows:

Position	**1st**	**2nd**	**3rd**	**4th**	**5th**	**6th**	**7th**	**8th**	**9th**	**10th**
Points	20	15	12	10	8	6	4	3	2	1

=== Drivers' Championship ===
Pos	Driver	BHR (Bahrain)		SEP (Malaysia)		BIR (Thailand)		BEI (China)		AUT (Japan)		SIC (China)		TAE (South Korea)		Pts
1	(Hong Kong) Marchy Lee	**1**	1	1	**1**	**1**	1	**1**	**4**	**1**	**1**	**1**	**Ret**	**1**	**1**	250
2	(South Korea) You Kyongouk	2	3	2	3	2	4	3	10	7	6	10	3	7	Ret	124
3	(Morocco) Mehdi Bennani	5	5	Ret	2	3	3	5	2	5	3	Ret	4	12	3	124
4	(Chinese Taipei) Hanss Lin Po Heng	3	6	**Ret**	14	4	**2**	2	1	3	Ret	9	Ret	3	2	120
5	(Philippines) Tyson Sy	Ret	2	3	4	6	11	9	Ret	2	2	3	12	4	5	108
6	(Bahrain) Salman Al Khalifa	9	9	7	9	5	5	4	3	6	10	Ret	5	5	6	84
7	(Philippines) Dado Pena	6	4	5	5	8	16	10	5	4	12	5	6	6	Ret	83
8	(Bahrain) Hamad Al Fardan	Ret	13	6	6	Ret	8	6	Ret	Ret	4	2	7	2	4	80
9	(Malaysia) Nik Iruwan Nik Izani	11	14	12	11	12	14	7	6	8	11	Ret	2	10	7	42
10	(Thailand) Robert Boughey	10	7	11	10	9	10	12	8	12	5	6	DSQ	9	8	39
11	(China) Han Han	7	10	9	Ret	14	9	13	9	10	7	7	10	11	9	32
12	(Bahrain) Mohammed Al Baharna	12	11	10	8	Ret	7	8	Ret	9	8	8	8	8	10	32
13	(Thailand) Maekkasit Weraporasu	8	8	14	13	10	12									9
14	(Japan) Tohru Jitsukawa	14	12	8	Ret											4
15	(Philippines) Gaby Dela Merced	13	16	16	15	13	15	14	11							1
Guest drivers ineligible to score points
–	(Indonesia) Moreno Soeprapto	4	**Ret**	4	7	7	6	11	7			4	1			–
–	(Philippines) Mike Potenciano					11	13									–
–	(Hong Kong) Michael Ting									11	9	Ret	14			–
–	(United States) Mark Patterson											11	9			–
–	(Macau) Ao Chi Hong											13	11			–
–	(Malaysia) Chin Tzer Jinn			13	12											–
–	(Hong Kong) Tobia Kipper											12	13			–
–	(South Korea) Lee Kookhyun													13	Ret	–
–	(Malaysia) Karshana Dissanayake	Ret	15													–
–	(Chinese Taipei) Kuo Chia-Ming			15	Ret											–
–	(United Kingdom) Mark Goddard									Ret	Ret					–
Pos	Driver	BHR (Bahrain)		SEP (Malaysia)		BIR (Thailand)		BEI (China)		AUT (Japan)		SIC (China)		TAE (South Korea)		Pts

Colour	Result
Gold	Winner
Silver	Second place
Bronze	Third place
Green	Points classification
Blue	Non-points classification
Blue	Non-classified finish (NC)
Purple	Retired, not classified (Ret)
Red	Did not qualify (DNQ)
Red	Did not pre-qualify (DNPQ)
Black	Disqualified (DSQ)
White	Did not start (DNS)
White	Withdrew (WD)
White	Race cancelled (C)
Blank	Did not practice (DNP)
Blank	Did not arrive (DNA)
Blank	Excluded (EX)

**Bold** – Pole
Italics – Fastest Lap

=== Rookie Cup ===
Pos	Driver	BHR (Bahrain)		SEP (Malaysia)		BIR (Thailand)		BEI (China)		AUT (Japan)		SIC (China)		TAE (South Korea)		Pts
1	(Morocco) Mehdi Bennani	1	1	Ret	1	1	1	1	1	1	1	Ret	2	5	1	223
2	(Thailand) Robert Boughey	4	2	3	3	2	4	4	3	4	3	2	DSQ	2	4	168
3	(Bahrain) Hamad Al Fardan	Ret	5	1	2	Ret	2	2	Ret	Ret	2	1	3	1	2	155
4	(Malaysia) Nik Iruwan Nik Izani	5	6	4	4	4	6	3	2	2	5	Ret	1	3	3	144
5	(China) Han Han	2	4	2	Ret	6	3	5	4	3	4	3	4	4	5	138
6	(Thailand) Maekkasit Weraporasu	3	3	5	5	3	5									60
7	(Philippines) Gaby Dela Merced	6	7	6	6	5	7	6	5							48
