= Henry Lee Junior =

Hong Kong racing driver

- 李萬祺
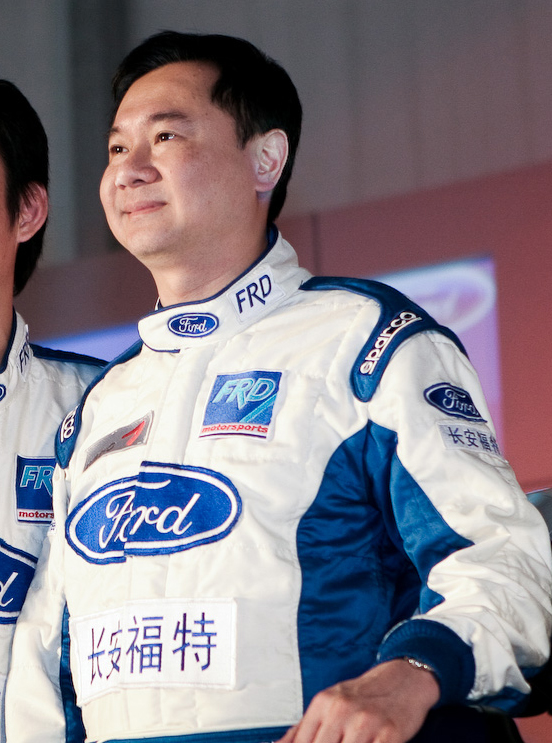
- Lee at the 2006 China Circuit Championship in Shanghai
- Born: 18 March 1958 (age 68); British Hong Kong
- Spouses: Candice Yu (m. 1987; div. 2003) Yu Yang (m. 2008)
- Children: 3

FIA World Touring Car Championship
- Years active: 2007
- Former teams: Ghiasport, WK Longman Racing, Changan Ford Racing

Previous series
- 2007: FIA World Touring Car Championship

Championship titles
- 2000: Asian Touring Car Series
- Statistics up to date as of 21 November 2011.

Chinese name
- Traditional Chinese: 李萬祺
- Simplified Chinese: 李万祺
Transcriptions
Standard Mandarin
- Hanyu Pinyin: Lǐ Wànqí
Yue: Cantonese
- Jyutping: lei^{5} maan^{6}kei^{4}

Henry Lee Man-Kee Junior (Chinese: 李萬祺; born 18 March 1958) is a Hong Kong racing driver.

== Early life ==
Lee is the son of Henry Lee Hok-Ping who was a motorcycle racer and worked for Sime Darby. Lee majored in business administration and graduated from University of Southern California. He was an auto racing fan from an early age because of his father's influence. He began racing karts in 1986 and competed in the Guia Race of Macau for the first time in 1988.

== Racing career ==
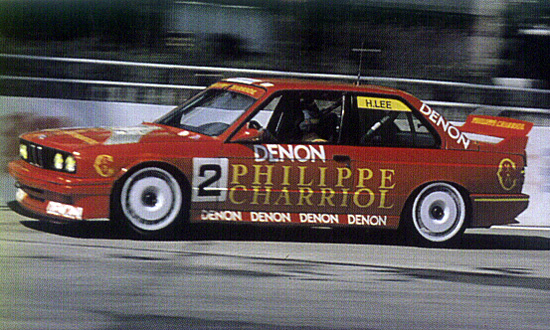
Henry Lee Junior racing his BMW at Zhuhai in 1994.

In 1999, Lee drove a Volvo S40 for Ghiasport, sponsored by Ericsson.

Lee declared bankruptcy in 2001 after suffering losses during the Asian Financial Crisis in 1997 -1999. Afterwards, all his racing activities are sponsored.

Lee drove for WK Longman Racing in the 2000 Asian Touring Car Series, sponsored by NuLife. After a season-long battle with friend and rival Charles Kwan, he won the championship after finishing second overall in the Guia Race of Macau.

Lee raced again in the 2002 Hong Kong Touring Car Championship for GR Asia. He drove a Ford Focus ST170 which was sponsored by Valvoline and won the championship.

In 2005, Lee drove a Honda Accord for Ghiasport in the China Circuit Championship (CCC).

Lee competed again in the CCC, driving a Ford Focus for Changan Ford Racing. He won the round 5 race at the Golden Port Circuit in Beijing.

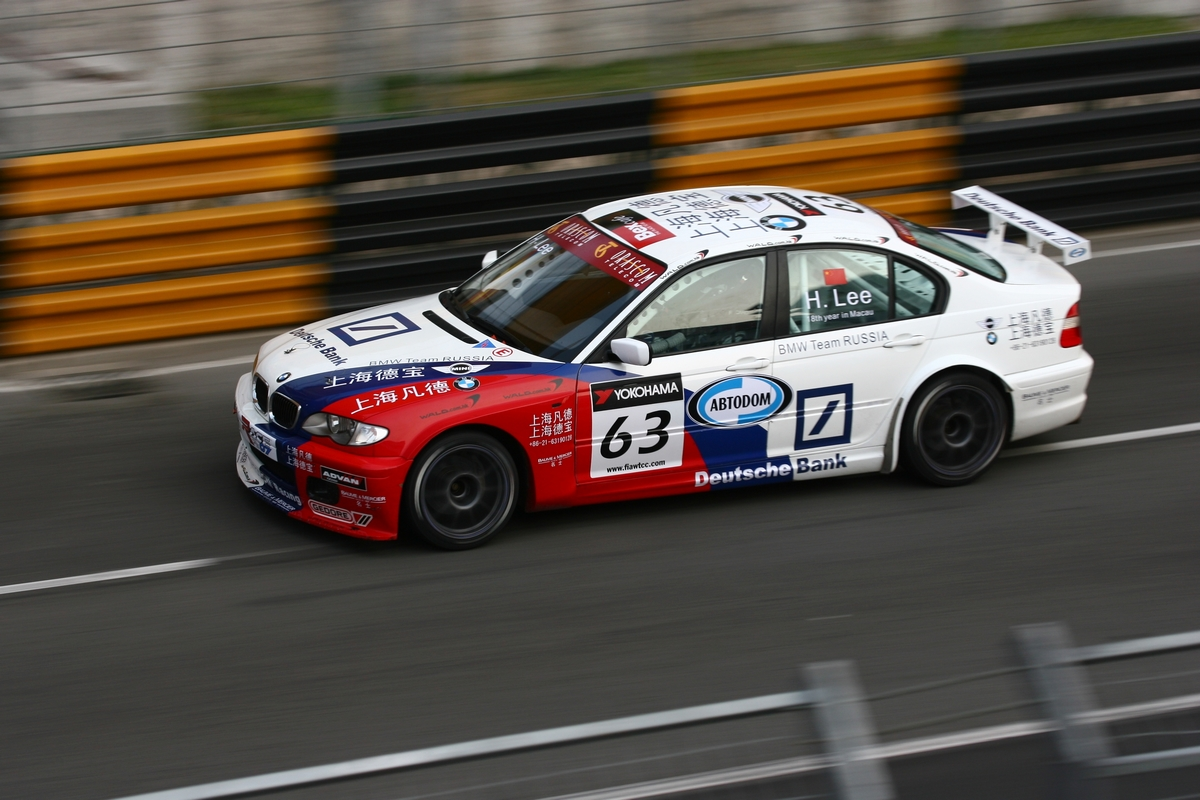
Henry Lee Junior driving his BMW320i in the Macau Guia Race in 2007.

In 2007, Lee took part in the World Touring Car Championship finale in Macau, driving a BMW 320i for Avtodom Racing. He qualified 27th but lost early in the race.

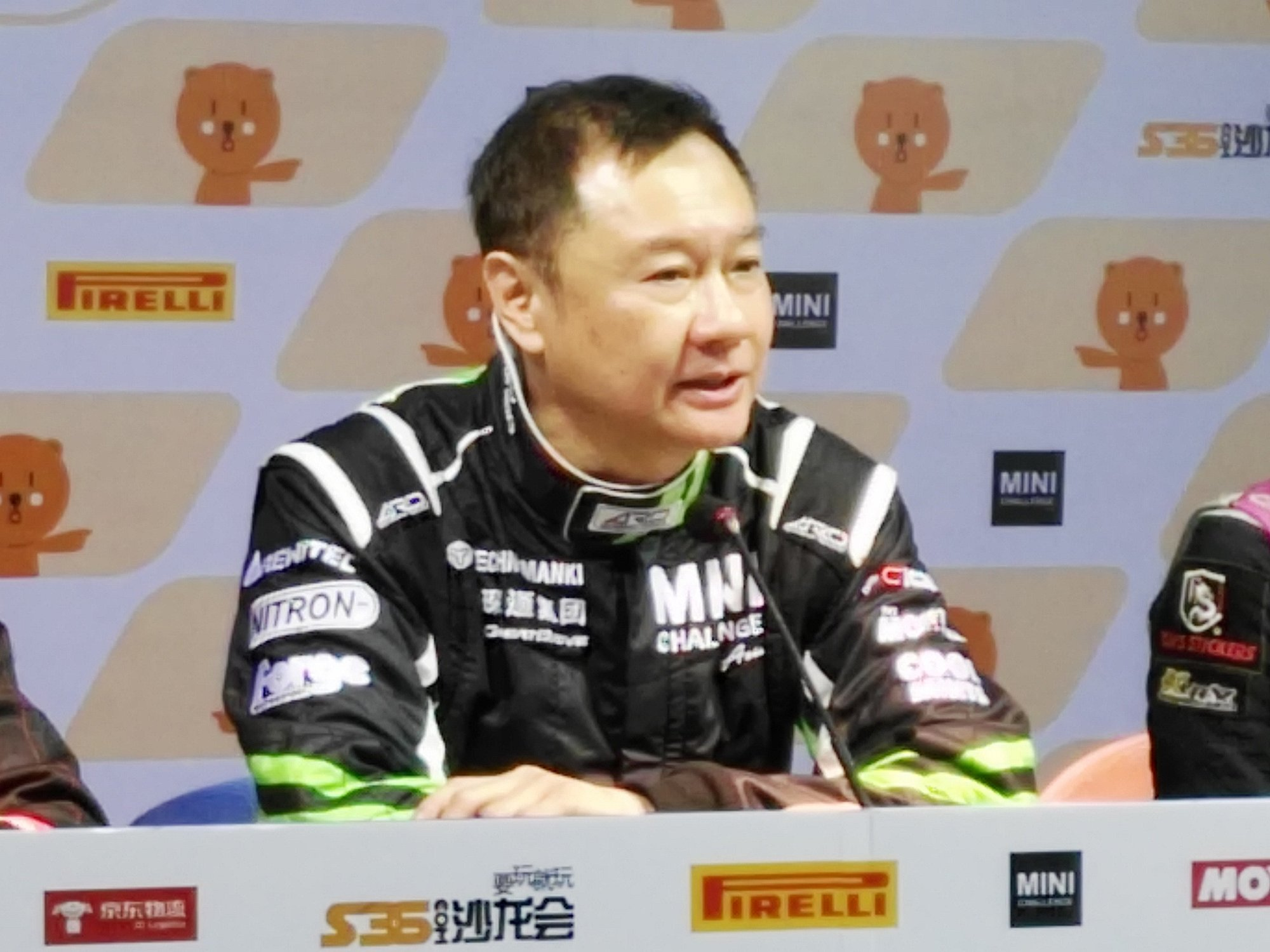
2018 Henry Lee Junior at Mini Challenge Asia press conference.

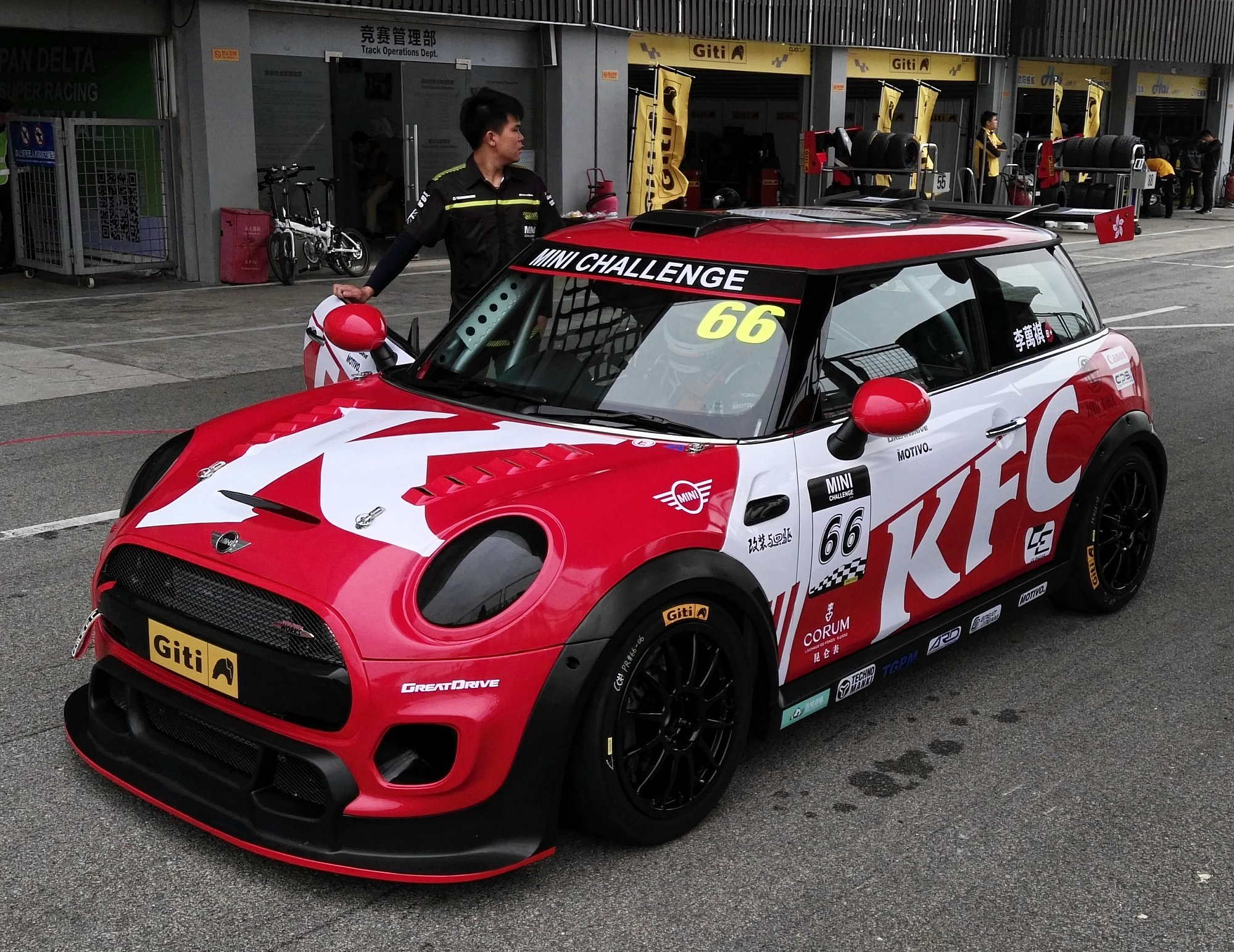
2018 Henry Lee Junior's Mini Challenge Asia race car.

== Personal life ==
Lee married actress Candice Yu in 1987. They have two daughters, born in 1988 and 1991. They divorced in 2003. In January 2008, Candice Yu claimed that she did not receive her alimony every month.

In 2007, Lee had a son with his girlfriend Yu Yang, who is 24 years his junior. Lee and Yang married on 31 January 2008.

== Bankruptcy ==
Lee's racing mentor Ngai Chiu-Neng died of liver cancer in 1996. Later that year, Lee invited Ngai's widow, Chui Yin-Ping, to invest HK$1.8million into his company Top Pacific Communication. In 1998, Chui sold her shares back. In 2002, she filed for Lee's bankruptcy when he could not repay the money owed to her. The court granted an immediate bankruptcy order to Lee on 5 September 2002.

Sporting positions
Preceded by N/A	Asian Touring Car Championship Champion; 2000	Succeeded by Charoensukhawatana Nattavude
