= Charles Kwan =

Hong Kong racing driver

- 關兆昌
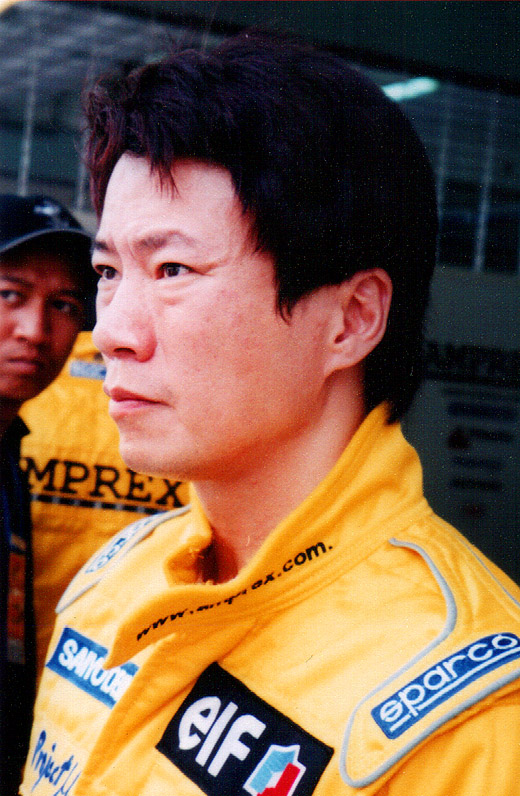
- Charles Kwan at Sepang in June 2001.
- Born: September 3, 1963 (age 63)
- Occupation: Racing driver
- Years active: 1993–2017

Charles Kwan Siu-Cheung (Traditional Chinese: 關兆昌, born September 3, 1963) is the most successful Hong Kong racing driver who has competed in the Macau Guia Race, Japan GT Championship, FIA GT Championship, Porsche Carrera Cup Asia, South East Asia Touring Car Zone Challenge (SEATCZC) and the Asian Touring Car Championship. He was the winner of the 1993 Guia Race, three times SEATCZC champion and the 2003 Porsche Carrera Cup Asia champion. He also performed roadtests and wrote columns for car magazines in Hong Kong.

== Racing career ==
Kwan first came to prominence, after winning numerous supporting races in prior years, he won the Guia Race in 1993 in a DTM spec BMW M3 and two other races on the same weekend (one was the Supercar Challenge in a Porsche 911 and CTM Cup race). In the Supercar Challenge in 1994, he was the first driver to give the Ferrari F355 its first win on its race debut and for the following year, it was a Ferrari F50 he repeated the feat.

=== 1992 Japanese Touring Car Championship ===
Kwan shared a BMW M3 at Team Over Take with fellow Hong Kong drivers Kevin Wong and Macau driver Winston Mak in the 1992 Japanese Touring Car Championship.

=== South East Asia Touring Car Zone Challenge ===
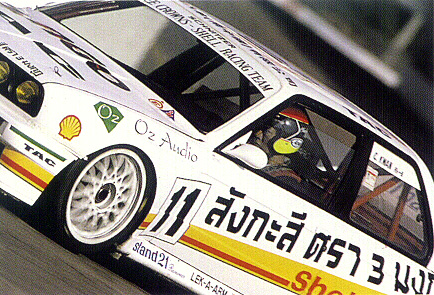
Charles Kwan driving his BMW M3 in the SEATCZC for Three Crowns Racing.

In 1994, Kwan competed in the South East Asian Touring Car Zone Challenge (SEATCZC), driving a BMW M3 for Three Crowns Racing. In the Zhuhai street race supporting the BPR Global GT Series, Kwan had qualified his BMW M3 second on the grid. Right at the race start, both Kwan and fourth place starter Henry Lee Junior were hit by Thailand's S. Prutirat and Man Manit, who drove Mercedes Benz 190Es for AIM Motorsport and were on pole position and third place. Both Kwan and Lee retired as a direct result. In a 2006 interview with Car Plus magazine, Kwan said he still considers that to be his most memorable race, due to the unsporting behaviour against him.

Kwan went on to become a three-time champion of the SEATCZC from 1997 to 1999, driving a Super Touring BMW 318i for EKS Motorsport and sponsored by Total/Fina.

=== Asia Pacific Touring Car Championship ===
Also in 1994, Kwan was sponsored by San Miguel Corporation in the Macau Guia Race and became the first Chinese driver to drive for Schnitzer Motorsport, alongside regular drivers Steve Soper and Joachim Winkelhock in the team's BMW 318is. The race was also a round of the Asia-Pacific Touring Car Championship. In the end, Kwan finished fifth overall as Winkelhock won and Soper finished second. He would continue to drive for Schnitzer in the next few years.

=== Asian Touring Car Series ===
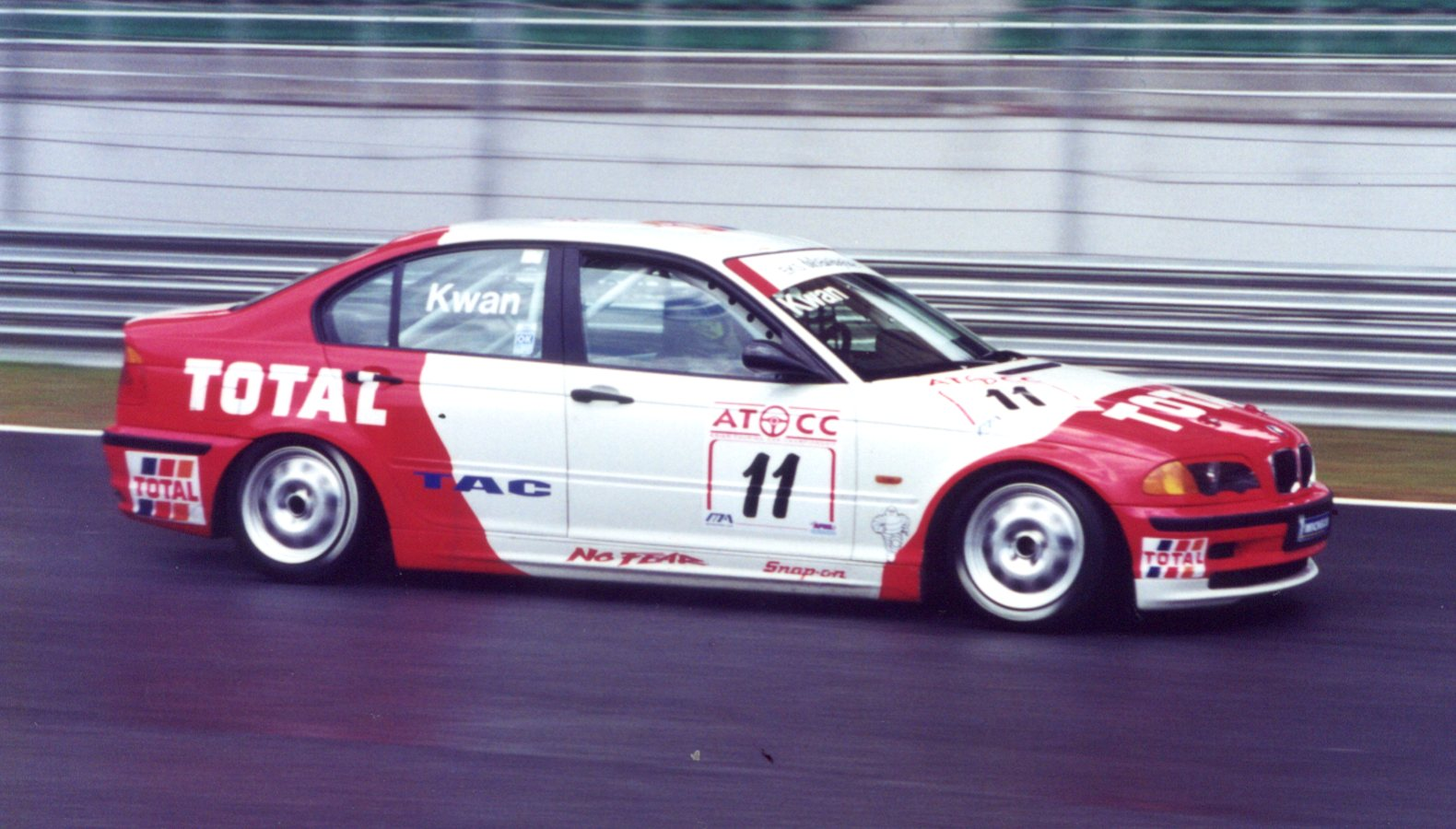
Charles Kwan in his BMW320i

The SEATCZC became the Asian Touring Car Series in 2000 as the series changed to use Super Production regulations. WK Longman Racing joined the series with their duo of Peugeot 306 race cars, to be driven by Henry Lee Jr and C. Nattavude, with support from engine tuner Richard Longman in the UK.

Kwan stayed with EKS Motorsport and the team entered two BMW 320is for the season, one for Kwan and one for Paul Chan. Kwan drove one of his most memorable races at the Batu Tiga Speedway at Shah Alam this year. His engine had broken down during practice. Although his teammate Paul Chan kindly lent him his engine for the race, the engine replacement work meant Kwan did not take part in qualifying and had to start the race from the back of the grid. Despite this, he passed all the drivers in front of him to claim the victory.

Despite his great drives during the season, Kwan lost the championship to Peugeot driver Henry Lee Jr at the final race in Macau. This was his last appearance in the Guia Race.

=== Japan GT Championship ===
In 2001, Kwan joined Amprex Motorsport and raced in the Japan GT Championship's invitational race at Sepang, sharing a Mazda RX-7 with team owner Genji Hashimoto. With Kwan driving, the car was up to third place in the GT300 class when it broke down.

From 2002, the team switched to a BMW M3 GT prepared by Schnitzer Motorsport, but the car was just not competitive against the fully tuned up Japanese machines.

=== Merdeka Millennium Endurance Race ===
Between 2002 and 2004, Kwan also competed in the Merdeka Millennium Endurance Race at Sepang, Malaysia with Amprex Motorsport.

In 2002, Kwan, Kevin Wong and Genji Hashimoto drove the Japan GT spec Mazda RX-7 in the race, although it set a scintillating pace, it did not have the reliability to finish the race.

In 2003, he shared the driving of the BMW M3 GT with Genji Hashimoto and Matthew Marsh. The team led the race after a fierce battle with BSA Motorsport's Radical SR3 and Porsche 911 GT3 Cup until problems hit. The team finished way down the order.

In 2004, Kwan did the MMER again with Amprex Motorsports, this time using an ACO/FIA GT1 spec Lamborghini Murciélago R-GT and sharing with German driver Norman Simon and Genji Hashimoto. The team easily out-performed every other entry and led most of the race until it broke down once again, handing victory to the Honda Malaysia Racing Team.

=== FIA GT Championship ===
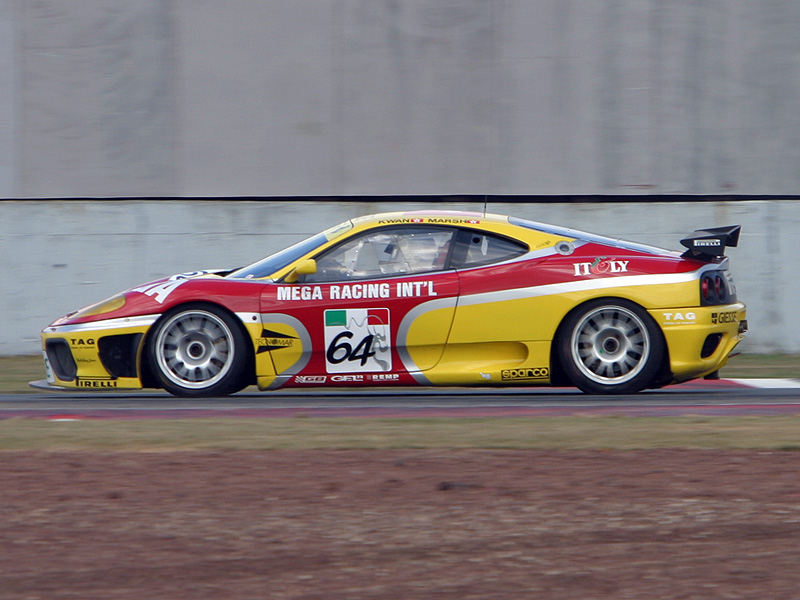
Charles Kwan & Matthew Marsh's Ferrari 360 during 2004 FIA GT race at Zhuhai.

In November 2004, Kwan made his only appearance in the FIA GT Championship by competing in the series' China Round in Zhuhai. Driving for GPC Sport, he shared a Ferrari 360 Modena with Matthew Marsh and finished fourth in the GT2 class, after suffering long delays in the pits due to a starter motor problem.

=== Porsche Carrera Cup Asia ===
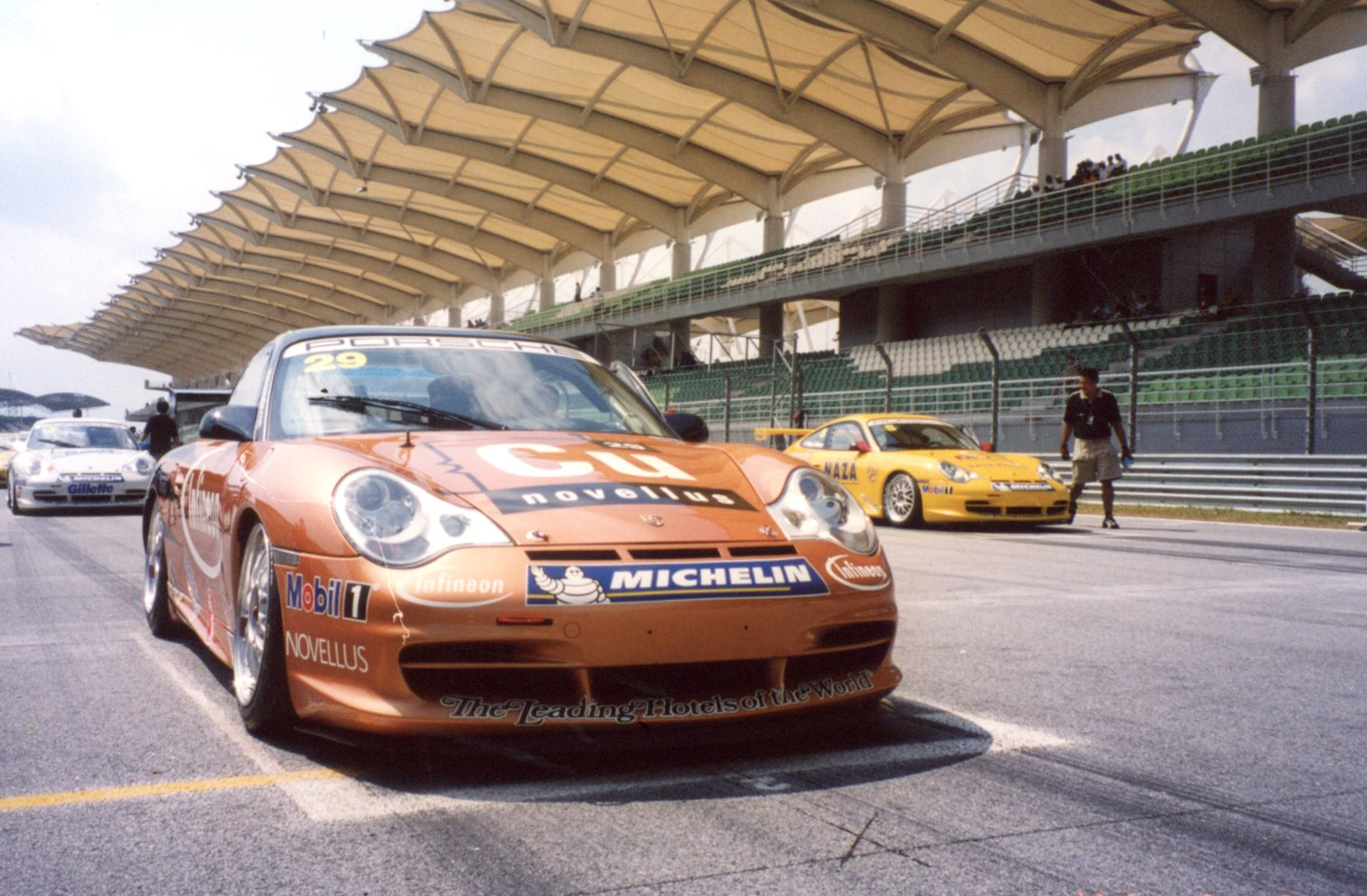
Charles Kwan in his Porsche Carrera Cup car

In 2003, Kwan moved back to the Asian scene and became the first champion of the inaugural Porsche Carrera Cup Asia Series, despite losing the final race to Malaysian former F1 driver Alex Yoong.

After the final race of the 2004 Porsche Carrera Cup Asia Series in Macau, Kwan announced his retirement from racing so he could spend more time with his family. But he clarified that his retirement is from seasonal championship style racing only and he would still take part in endurance races. He finished third in the race and set fastest lap: 2:31.956. He also finished third in the championship.

=== Hong Kong Le Mans Team ===
In 2005, Kwan acted in a consultancy role for the Hong Kong Le Mans Team set up by Hong Kong-based-British racing driver Matthew Marsh.

In the beginning of 2006, Kwan was persuaded by Matthew Marsh to race for the team at the Le Mans 24 Hours race. Although he agreed, the team was not granted an entry by the ACO for 2006 and therefore did not race.

=== 24 Hours of Dubai ===
On December 20, 2017, Kwan came out of retirement to race in the Dubai 24 Hour race, alongside other Hong Kong drivers Marchy Lee, Adderly Fong, Darryl O'Young and Shaun Thong.

== Racing record ==
=== Complete South East Asia Touring Car Zone Challenge results ===
(key) (Races in bold indicate pole position) (Races in italics indicate fastest lap)

Year	Team	Car	1	2	3	4	5	6	7	8	9	10	11	12	13	14	15	16	Pos.	Pts
1996	3 Crowns Shell SEA Racing Team	BMW 318is	PAT; 1; 5	PAT; 2 DNF	JOH; 1; 2	JOH; 2; 2	JOH; 1; 1	JOH; 2; 1	SEN; 1; 3	SEN; 2; 4	SEN; 1; 3	SEN; 2; 3	ZHU; 1; 2	ZHU; 2; 4	PAT; 1; 1	PAT; 2; 3			2nd	–
1997	EKS Motorsport	BMW 320i	PAT; 1; 1	PAT; 2; 1	JOH; 1; 1	JOH; 2; 2	JOH; 1; 1	JOH; 2; 1	SEN; 1; 2	SEN; 2; 1	SEN; 1; 1	SEN; 2 DNF	ZHU; 1; 1	ZHU; 2; 2	ZHU; 1; 1	ZHU; 2; 1	PAT; 1; 1	PAT; 2; 1	1st	–

Sporting positions
Preceded by Emanuele Pirro	Guia Race winner 1993	Succeeded by Joachim Winkelhock
Preceded by Inaugural	Porsche Carrera Cup Asia champion 2003	Succeeded by Matthew Marsh
