= Hamza Dirani =

Jordanian racing driver

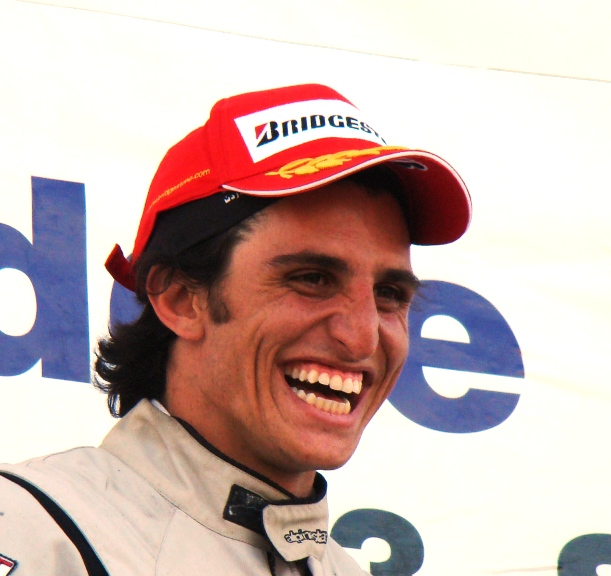
- Hamza Dirani in 2008 Middle East Karting Cup.
- Nationality: Jordanian
- Born: Amman, Jordan

Hamza Dirani حمزة ديراني (born in Amman, August 16, 1982) is a Jordanian race car and kart racing driver. In addition to competing successfully in karting in Jordan, Lebanon, Dubai and Egypt, in 2005, he joined Meritus Racing to race in the Formula BMW Asia racing series and be the first Jordanian to participate in Formula Racing. He finished all his races in the top ten. He is also an entrepreneur, having established his own karting business in 2006.

== Racing career highlights ==
In 2005, Dirani joined formula racing, participating in several rounds of the Formula BMW Asia championship and finishing in the top-ten. He also drove as a guest by invitation in the Formula Ford Championship at the Bahrain International Circuit. He has also continued successfully competing in karting, taking third in the 2008 Middle East Karting Championship.

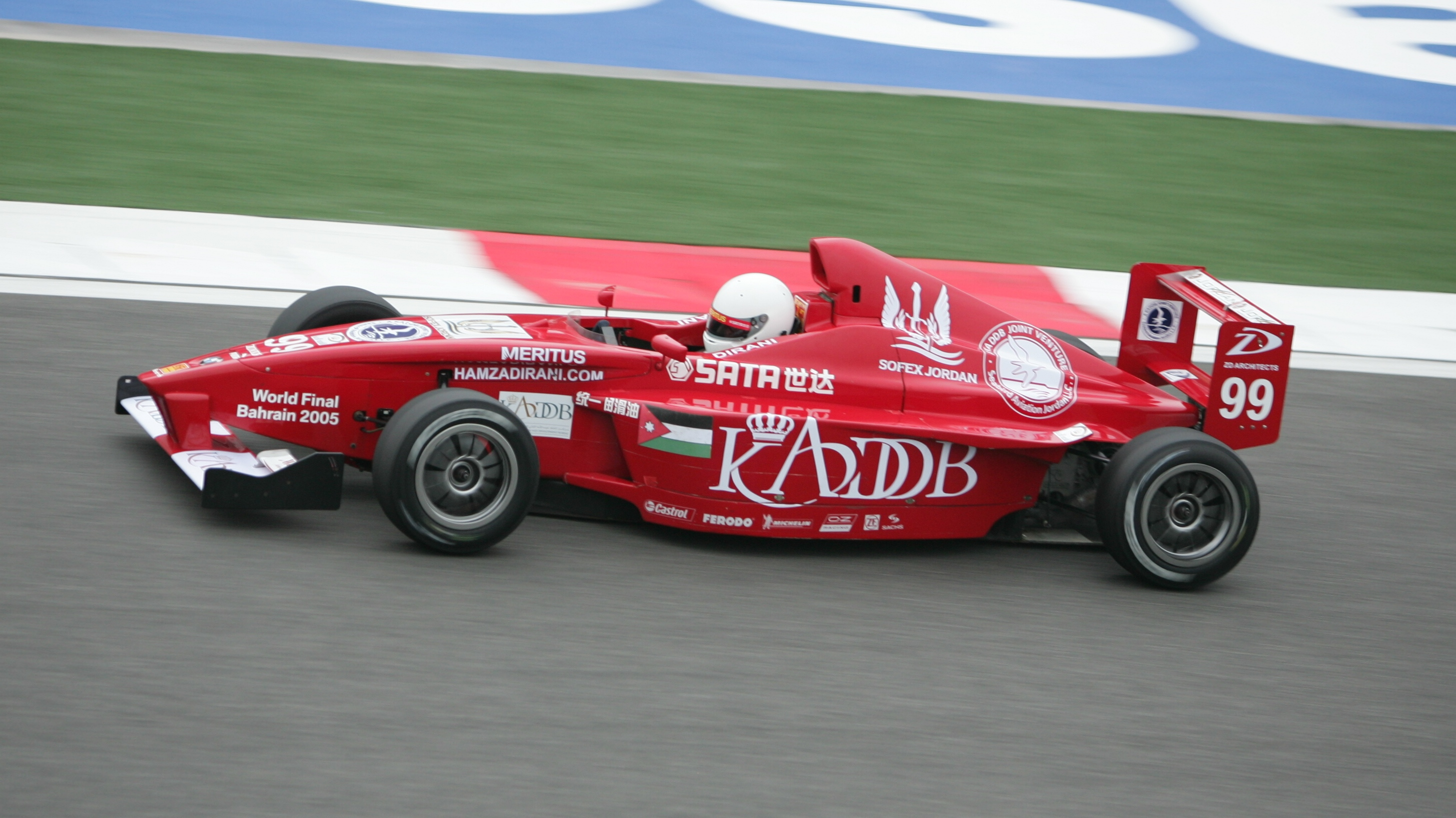
Dirani racing in Formula BMW, Shanghai, China

List of races Hamza Dirani has Competed in

Year	Championship	Result	Country
2005	Formula Ford Bahrain	3rd	Bahrain
2007	Jordan International Rally	2nd	Jordan
2008	Middle East Karting Cup	3rd	Egypt, United Arab Emirates
2023	IAME Middle East	1st	United Arab Emirates

== Business ==
In 2006, Dirani became the national official representative of Tony Kart. In 2007, he opened his own company, Jordan Karting, and organized the first Tony Kart Ramadan Challenge.

Below is a list of races organized by Jordan Karting:

Year	Title	No. Of Races	Country
2007	Tony Kart Ramadan Challenge	3	Jordan
2008	Ramadan Karting Challenge	3	Jordan
2009	Open Karting Challenge	4	Jordan
2009	Ramadan Karting Challenge	3	Jordan
2009	Rotax Max Challenge	5	Jordan
2010	Open Karting Challenge	4	Jordan
2010	Ramadan Karting Challenge	3	Jordan
2010	Rotax Max Challenge	5	Jordan
2010	Jordan Karting Championship	5	Jordan
2010	Saudi Federation Karting Championship	7	Saudi Arabia
2010	FIA World Council Karting Race	1	Bahrain
2011	Ramadan Karting Challenge	3	Jordan
2023	IAME Middle East	2	United Arab Emirates

== Karting School ==
Here are some results of drivers sponsored and trained by Dirani before and during the Dirani Karting School

Year	Driver	Championship	Class	Result
2004	Hamza Abdelhadi	Jordan Karting Championship	Seniors	2nd Overall
2004	Hamza Abdelhadi	Aqaba Karting Race	Seniors	Winner
2006	Serri Rasekh	Jordan Karting Championship	Seniors	2nd Overall
2006	Hayat Abu Samra	Jordan Karting Championship	Seniors	Ladies Cup
2007	Mohammad Muradi	Rotax Max Challenge - Round 1	Seniors	Winner
2007	Farah Zakaria	Jordan Karting Championship	Juniors	Winner
2008	Othman Abu Samra	Middle East Karting Championship	Juniors	Winner
2008	Mohammad Bustami	Jordan Karting Championship	Seniors	2nd Overall
2008	Mohammad Bustami	Ramadan Karting Challenge	Seniors	Winner
2008	Hamza Bustami	Ramadan Karting Challenge	Juniors	Winner
2023	Abdullah Kamel	Saudi Games		Winner
2024	Abdullah Kamel	Rotax Max Challenge KSA	Seniors	Winner
