= Salman Al Khalifa =

Bahraini racing driver (born 1976)

- Born: 24 March 1976 (age 50) Muharraq, Bahrain

TCR International Series career
- Debut season: 2016
- Current team: Bas Koeten Racing
- Car number: 78
- Starts: 2

Previous series
- 2010-16 2007-10: BIC 2000cc Challenge; Batelco 2000cc Challenge

Championship titles
- 2008: Batelco 2000cc Challenge

Salman Al Khalifa (born 24 March 1976) is a Bahraini racing driver currently competing in the Bahrain International Circuit 2000cc Challenge. Having previously competed in the TCR International Series.

== Racing career ==
Al Khalifa began his career in 2007 in the Bahrain International Circuit 2000cc Challenge. He won the championship in that series in 2008, taking 14 wins from 16 possible, finishing on the podium in every race.

In March 2016, it was announced that Al Khalifa would race in the TCR International Series at his home event at the Bahrain International Circuit, driving a SEAT León Cup Racer for Bas Koeten Racing.

== Racing record ==
=== Complete TCR International Series results ===
(key) (Races in bold indicate pole position) (Races in italics indicate fastest lap)

Year	Team	Car	1	2	3	4	5	6	7	8	9	10	11	12	13	14	15	16	17	18	19	20	21	22	DC	Points
2016	Bas Koeten Racing	SEAT León Cup Racer	BHR; 1; 16	BHR; 2; 9	POR; 1	POR; 2	BEL; 1	BEL; 2	ITA; 1	ITA; 2	AUT; 1	AUT; 2	GER; 1	GER; 2	RUS; 1	RUS; 2	THA; 1	THA; 2	SIN; 1	SIN; 2	MYS; 1	MYS; 2	MAC; 1	MAC; 2	33rd	2
