= Matthew Marsh (racing driver) =

Motorsport marketing specialist

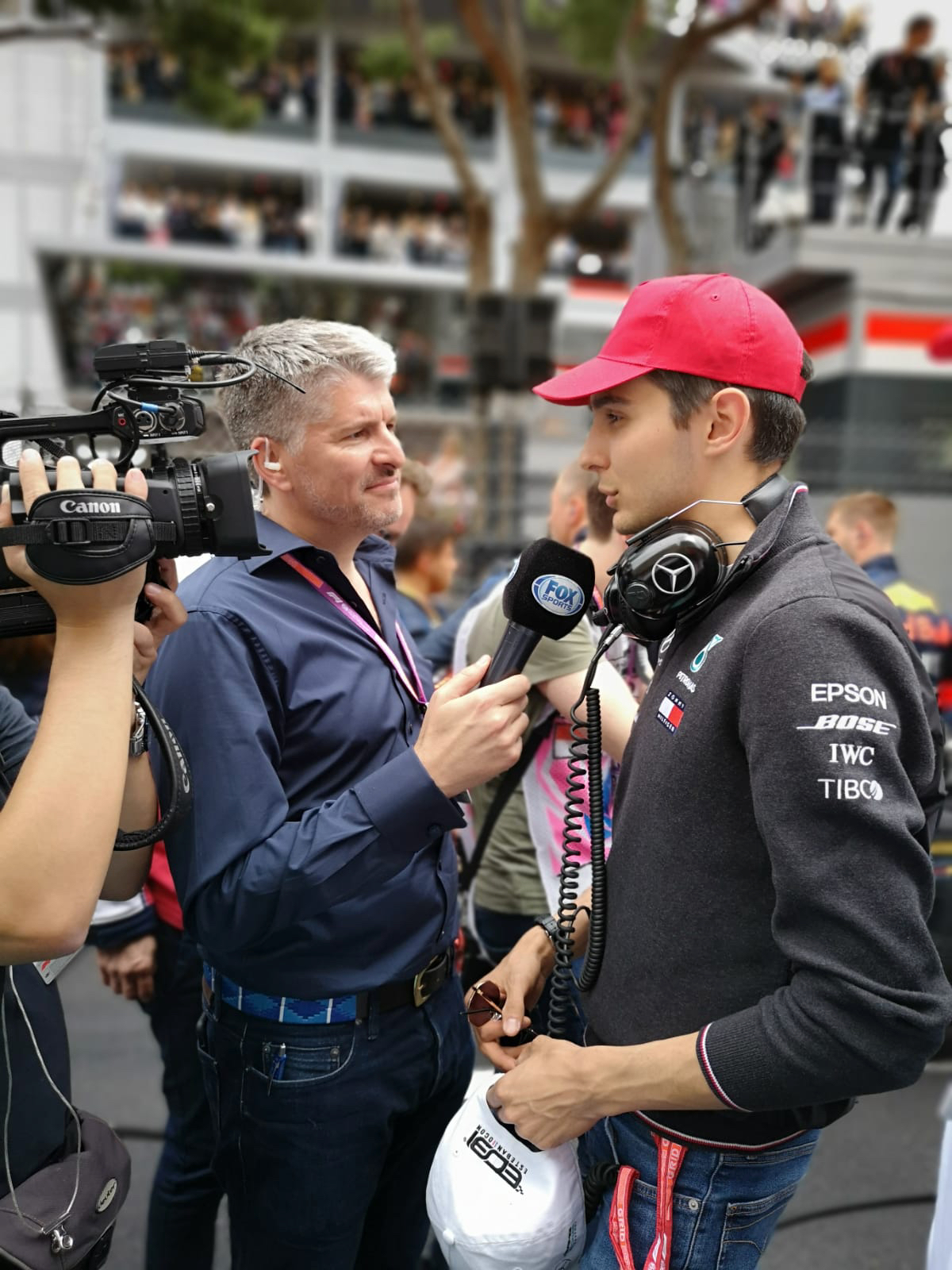
- Marsh interviewing Esteban Ocon at the 2019 Monaco Grand Prix.
- Born: 24 September 1968 (age 58); Welwyn, England

24 Hours of Le Mans career
- Years: 2007, 2009
- Teams: G.P.C. Sport, Kruse-Schiller Motorsport

Matthew Marsh (born 24 September 1968 in Welwyn, England) is a British motorsport marketing specialist, television presenter, and former racing driver currently based in Singapore.

Marsh is the founder of the motorsport marketing consultancy Ecurie Drapeau Jaune (EDJ), which advises clients on sponsorship in motorsport. Previously, he served as Senior Vice President at Just Marketing International (JMI) and Chime Sports Marketing (CSM), working for Zak Brown who is currently the McLaren Racing chief executive officer.

Alongside his marketing work, Marsh has worked as a broadcaster and journalist, presenting Formula 1 coverage across Asia for ESPN, Star TV, and FOX Sports, and contributing analysis for outlets including the BBC, Bloomberg, and Channel News Asia.

As a driver, Marsh competed in touring cars, GT, and endurance racing. He won the 2004 Porsche Carrera Cup Asia and, in 2007, became the first driver to represent Hong Kong at the 24 Hours of Le Mans. He also secured class victories at the Nürburgring 24 Hours in 2008 and 2013.

== Racing career ==
=== Porsche Carrera Cup ===
Marsh was a regular competitor in the Porsche Carrera Cup Asia, winning the championship in 2004 while driving for A-Ha Racing. He continued to race in the series in subsequent seasons, including 2005, 2006, 2008, and 2012.

Outside of Asia, Marsh was a guest driver in the Porsche Carrera Cup Great Britain (Thuxton 2004), Porsche Supercup (Monaco Grand Prix 2005), and Porsche Carrera Cup Japan (Motegi 2006).

=== World Touring Car Championship ===
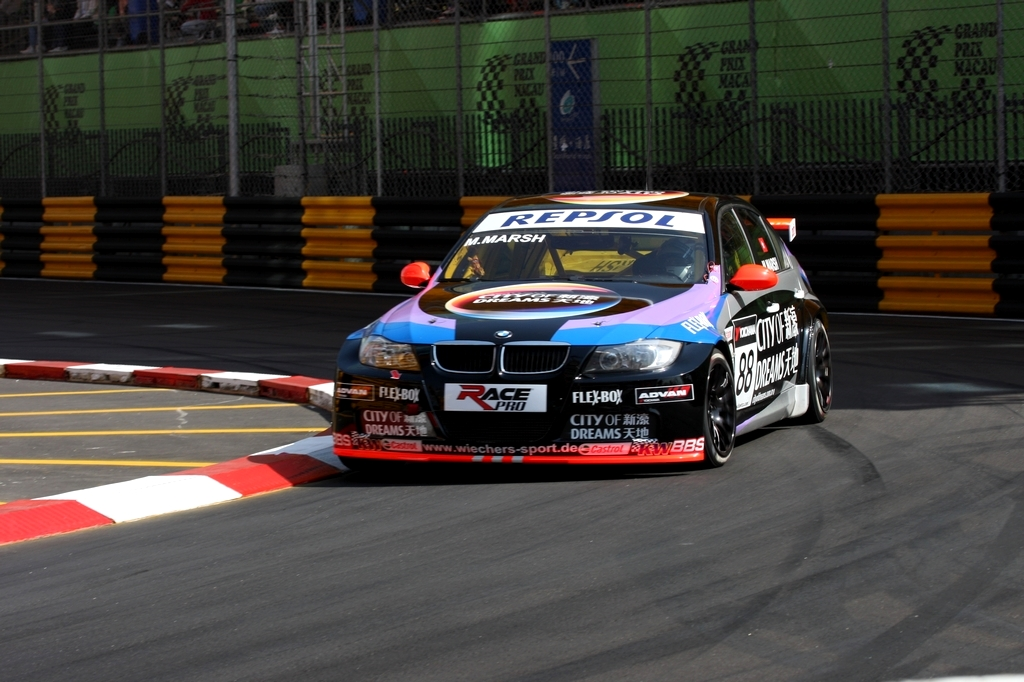
Matthew Marsh driving his BMW320si at the Macau Guia race.

Marsh drove a BMW 320si for Wiechers-Sport at the 2008 World Touring Car Championship round in Japan, finishing 21st and 14th in the two races. He also competed in the Macau Grand Prix, finishing eighth and becoming the first driver representing Hong Kong to score an FIA World Championship point.

=== 24 Hours of Le Mans ===
Marsh became the first driver to represent Hong Kong at the 24 Hours of Le Mans in 2007, competing with GPC Sport in a Ferrari F430 in the GT2 class. The team qualified 52nd overall (11th in class) but retired after completing 252 laps due to mechanical issues.

Marsh returned to 2009 24 Hours of Le Mans, driving a Lola B07/46 for Kruse-Schiller Motorsport in the LMP2 class alongside Hideki Noda and Jean de Pourtalès. The team qualified 30th overall (tenth in class) and was in contention for a podium finish before retiring in the 23rd hour with an engine failure.

=== Endurance Racing ===
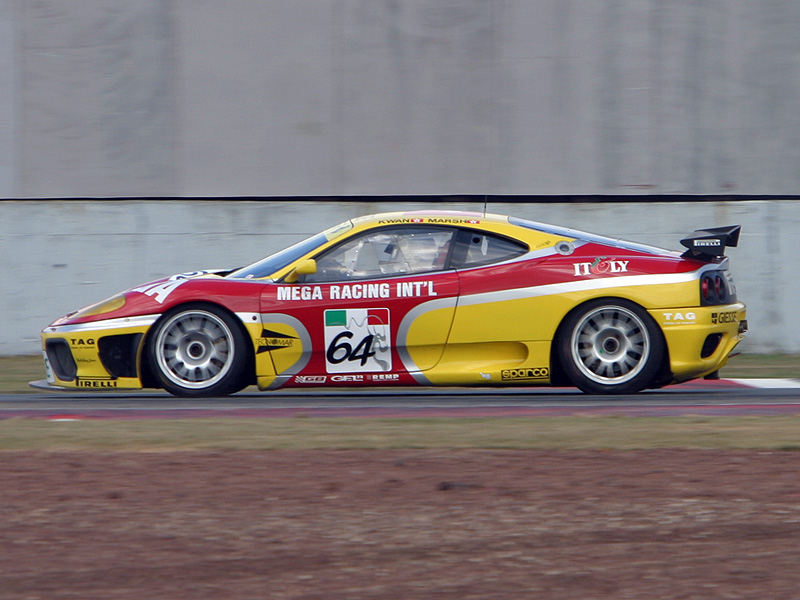
Matthew Marsh and Charles Kwan's Ferrari 360C at Zhuhai.

Marsh competed in a range of endurance racing events, including the FIA GT Championship, Le Mans Series, and American Le Mans Series, as well as major races such as the 12 Hours of Sebring, Rolex 24 at Daytona, and Nürburgring 24 Hours.

In 2002, Marsh secured a class win at the Bathurst 24 Hour, driving a Sterling Motorsport BMW M Coupe with VJ Angelo, Ric Shaw, and Ross Buckingham.

Marsh entered the Nürburgring 24 Hours a total of seven times between 2000 and 2013. In 2008, he won the SPT8 class as part of Aston Martin’s factory team, co-driving with Oliver Mathai and Shinichi Katsura. On his last entry in 2013, he won the E1-XP2 class for experimental class vehicles in a Hybrid Hydrogen Rapide S with Aston Martin Chief Executive Officer Dr Ulrich Bez, Wolfgang Schuhbauer, Shinichi Katsura.

In 2010, Marsh won the GTC class in the 1000 km of Zhuhai driving an Audi R8 LMS with Marchy Lee and Alex Yoong.

==== Merdeka Millennium Endurance Race ====
In August 2003, Marsh was invited by Amprex Motorsport to share the driving duties of the BMW M3 GT with Genji Hashimoto and Charles Kwan in the Merdeka Millennium Endurance Race held at Sepang International Circuit. The team led the race after a fierce battle with BSA Motorsport's Radical SR3 and Porsche 911 GT3 Cup until problems hit. The team finished way down the order.

==== FIA GT Championship ====
Marsh and Kwan drove for G.P.C Sport at the FIA GT Championship, Zhuhai round in 2004. The two drove a Ferrari 360 in GT2 class and took fourth place in class.

==== Hong Kong Le Mans Team ====
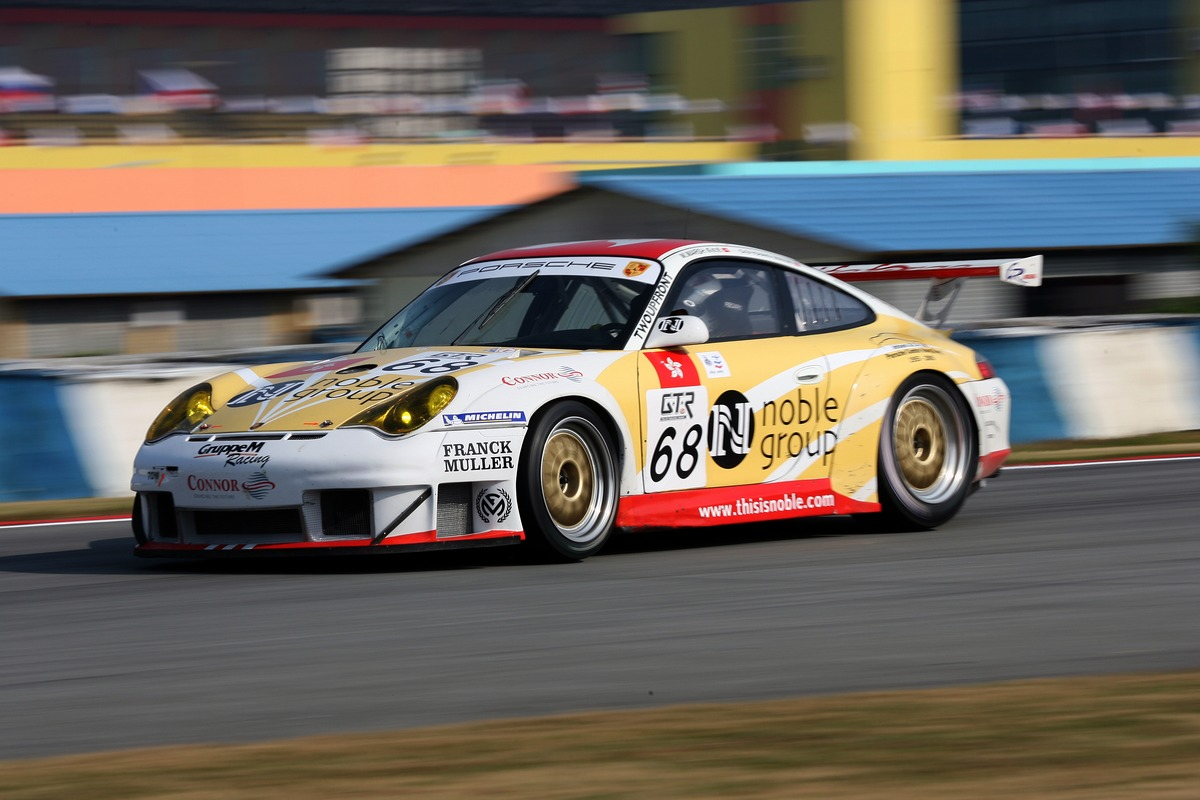
Matthew Marsh and Darryl O'Young's Porsche 911 GT3 racing in the FIA GT Championship at Zhuhai in 2005.

Marsh set up the Hong Kong Le Mans Team in 2005 with sponsorship from Noble Group and technical support by GruppeM, with the stated aim of competing at the 24 Hours of Le Mans in 2006. Darryl O'Young joined the team as his co-driver. The team took part in three Le Mans Endurance Series races that year, as well as the FIA GT Championship race at Zhuhai, finishing in fourth position in class. But the team failed to gain an entry and the project was terminated.

==== 24 Hours of Daytona ====
Marsh, alongside Thomas Biagi, Christian Montanari, Luis Monzón, and Fabio Venier, drove the Mastercar team's Ferrari F430 Challenge 000146550 (they also entered 000146408 with R. Ragazzi, M. C. M. Effiniz, C. Bertuzzi, J. Castellano, and F. Machado), as car number 56 in the 24 Hours of Daytona in 2008, and the team retired after 55 laps.

== Media, Hosting, and Marketing Career ==
=== Television and Media Work ===
Marsh has presented Formula 1 coverage across Asia since 1994 for ESPN, Star TV, and FOX Sports, and contributed analysis to outlets including the BBC, Bloomberg, and Channel News Asia. His writing has appeared in publications such as China Daily, New Straits Times, and the South China Morning Post.

=== Hosting ===
In addition to his media work, Marsh has hosted events including the Cannes Lions, Campaign’s Agency of the Year, Hong Kong FinTech Week, and the Thailand Creative Culture Agency's Global Soft Power Talks. He also serves as a judge for the Autosport Awards.

=== Motorsport Marketing Career ===
In 2005, Marsh founded the motorsport consultancy Ecurie Drapeau Jaune (EDJ), advising companies on sponsorship evaluation, commercial partnerships, and marketing activation in Formula 1, NASCAR, and Formula E. His work has focused on helping brands enter or expand their involvement in motorsport, particularly within the Asia-Pacific region.

From 2010 to 2018, Marsh served as Senior Vice President for Asia-Pacific at Just Marketing International (JMI) and Chime Sports Marketing (CSM), where he led partnership development efforts. Working alongside Zak Brown, he managed sponsorship programs for brands including AIG, Budweiser (AB InBev), Epson, Gillette (P&G), Hisense, IBM, Kashbet, InterContinental Hotels Group, Mengniu, and SGX.

== Racing record ==
=== 24 Hours of Le Mans results ===
Year	Team	Co-Drivers	Car	Class	Laps	Pos.	Class Pos.
2007	(Italy) GPC Sport	(Sweden) Carl Rosenblad (Spain) Jésus Diez Villaroel	Ferrari F430 GT2	GT2	252	DNF	DNF
2009	(Germany) Kruse Schiller Motorsport	(Japan) Hideki Noda (France) Jean de Pourtales	Lola B07/46-Mazda	LMP2	261	DNF	DNF

=== Complete World Touring Car Championship results ===
(key) (Races in bold indicate pole position) (Races in italics indicate fastest lap)

Year	Team	Car	1	2	3	4	5	6	7	8	9	10	11	12	13	14	15	16	17	18	19	20	21	22	23	24	DC	Points
2008	Wiechers-Sport	BMW 320si	BRA; 1	BRA; 2	MEX; 1	MEX; 2	ESP; 1	ESP; 2	FRA; 1	FRA; 2	CZE; 1	CZE; 2	POR; 1	POR; 2	GBR; 1	GBR; 2	GER; 1	GER; 2	EUR; 1	EUR; 2	ITA; 1	ITA; 2	JPN; 1; 21	JPN; 2; 14	MAC; 1; 17	MAC; 2; 8	21st	1

Sporting positions
Preceded by Charles Kwan	Porsche Carrera Cup Asia; Champion; 2004	Succeeded by Jonny Cocker
