= Bira Circuit =

Motorsport race track in Thailand

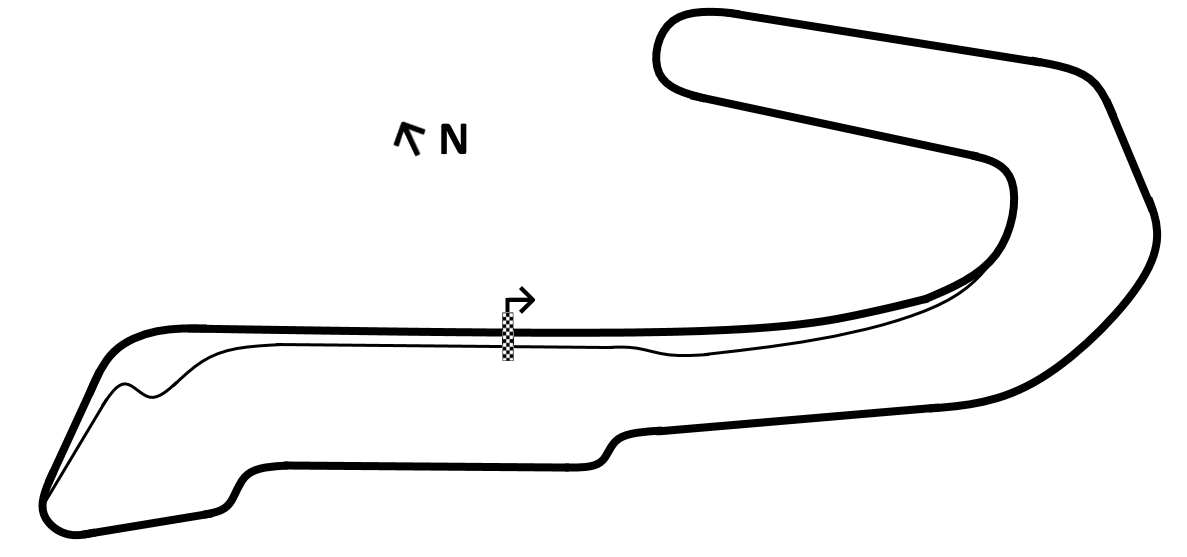
- Full Circuit (1986–present)
- Location: Pattaya, Thailand
- Coordinates: 12°55′17″N 101°0′33″E
- Capacity: 30,000
- Broke ground: 1985
- Opened: 26 April 1986; 40 years ago
- Major events: Former: Porsche Carrera Cup Asia (2003–2005); ATCS (2000–2006, 2008–2009); Formula BMW Asia (2003–2006); Formula Asia (1997–1998, 2000–2002); South East Asia Touring Car Zone Challenge (1992–1998)

Full Circuit (1986–present)
- Length: 2.410 km (1.498 mi)
- Turns: 11
- Race lap record: 1:01.444 ( (Australia) Sam Abay, Mygale FB02, 2006, Formula BMW)

Bira Circuit is a motor racing track in Thailand, located in 111 Moo 5 Banglamung, Chonburi, 15 km (9.3 mi) northeast of Pattaya. The circuit is located on State Highway 36 which is 120 km (75 mi) from Bangkok and 20-kilometre (12 mi) from the CBD of Pattaya.

The venue is named after first Thai Formula 1 racing driver, Prince Birabongse Bhanudej Bhanubandh. The circuit has been operated by Bira Circuit One Company, Limited. The track, initially opened in 1986, covers an area of 65 acres (260,000 m^{2}). It is a 2.410 km (1.498 mi) permanent motor and motorbike racing circuit with an offroad track, a rally stage and a go-kart facility.

The circuit is twisty and bumpy and consists of elevation and two chicanes, a fast downhill double apex corner. There are 30 pits for racecars, plus a control tower, medical center and meeting room. The grandstand and spectator area can accommodate up to 30,000 people. It is also the first circuit in Thailand that meets the standard of Fédération Internationale de l'Automobile (F.I.A.). The South East Asia Touring Car Zone Challenge (SEATCZC) has been run at Bira Circuit since 1992 and the Asian Formula 2000 since 1997. The Circuit has full facilities for arranging all kinds of motorsport events; race meeting, racing school, test drives, etc.

On the straights of Bira's go-kart track speeds of up to 100 km/h (62 mph) can be achieved depending on the weather conditions. In order to meet Commission Internationale de Karting's standard, the go-kart track was overhauled in 2006.

== Lap records ==
As of September 2016, the fastest official race lap records at the Bira Circuit are listed as:

Category	Time	Driver	Vehicle	Event
Full Circuit (1986–present): 2.410 km (1.498 mi)
Formula BMW	1:01.444	Sam Abay	Mygale FB02	2006 Pattaya Formula BMW Asia round
Asian Formula 2000	1:02.440	Ng Wai Leong	Argo Formula Asia	2000 Pattaya Formula Asia 2000 round
Super Touring	1:03.090	Charles Kwan	BMW 320	1998 Pattaya SEATCZC round
TCR Touring Car	1:04.669	Jack Lemvard	SEAT León Cup Racer	2016 Pattaya TCR Thailand round
Super 2000	1:07.761	Charoensukawattana Nattavude	Peugeot 306 GTi	2001 Pattaya ATCC round
