= William E. Connor II =

American-born, Hong Kong-based businessman (born 1949)

- Born: William Edwin Connor; 1949 or 1950 (age 76–77)
- Education: Stanford University; Santa Clara University; University of Southern California
- Occupations: Chairman, CEO
- Known for: Car collector
- Spouse: Jacque Connor
- Children: 3 sons

William Edwin "Chip" Connor II (born 1949) is a Japanese-born Hong Kong–based American businessman and car collector.

== Early life ==
Connor was born in 1949. His father, William E. Connor, started the eponymous William E. Connor & Associates in Japan in 1949 after the Second World War. According to Tatler, Connor "took over the family business in Tokyo in the mid-1980s", and moved the company's headquarters to Hong Kong in 1985.

Connor has an MBA from the University of Southern California and a JD from the University of Santa Clara.

== Career ==
Connor is the Chairman and CEO of William E. Connor and Associates. In 2013 Forbes estimated his net worth at US$1.03 billion; he had previously been ranked as high as 359 on the Forbes 400 in 2011.

== Personal life ==
With his wife Jacque, he has three sons. Connor has a significant vintage car collection including a Ferrari 250 SWB and a 250 GTO and vintage Porsche and Alfa Romeos. Connor has competed in the Porsche Infineon Carrera Cup Asia and has provided Ferrari for the Le Mans 24 Hours race.
