= Taebaek Racing Park =

Motorsport circuit in Taebaek, South Korea

- Location: Taebaek, Gangwon Province, South Korea
- Coordinates: 37°5′0″N 129°1′9″E
- Capacity: 3,500
- Opened: 16 October 2002; 23 years ago
- Major events: Former: Superrace Championship (2009–2014); Asian Touring Car Series (2003, 2005); Formula BMW Asia (2003–2005); Porsche Carrera Cup Asia (2003–2005)

Full Circuit (2002–present)
- Length: 2.500 km (1.553 mi)
- Turns: 10

Taebaek Racing Park (Korean: 태백레이싱파크) is a motorpsort circuit located in Taebaek, Gangwon Province, South Korea. Opened in 2002, it is the second oldest permanent racetrack in the country after Everland Speedway, and is the country's first FIA graded circuit.

The Superrace Championship hosted races at Taebaek until 2014. In addition, the Japanese Super Taikyu endurance auto series held a non-points race in 2008. The venue currently hosts two local championships: the Taebaek Speed Festival for cars and the Taebaek Track Festival for motorcycles.
