= Vutthikorn Inthraphuvasak =

Thai racing driver (born 1974)

- วุฒิกร อินทรภูวศักดิ์
- Born: 14 November 1974 (age 51); Thailand
- Nationality: (Thailand) Thai
- Categorisation: FIA Silver (until 2015); FIA Bronze (2016–)

Vutthikorn "Khun" Inthraphuvasak (Thai: วุฒิกร อินทรภูวศักดิ์ (Note: RTGS: Wutthikorn Inthraphuwasak.), born November 14 1974) is a Thai entrepreneur and racing driver.

== Entrepreneurship ==
Inthraphuvasak is the President of Bentley Thailand by AAS Auto Services and the Thai general importer of the British luxury brand Bentley, which belongs to the Volkswagen AG.

== Career ==
In 2004, Inthraphuvasak began with GT racing and mainly competed in Asian racing series. He raced in the Porsche Carrera Cup Asia, where he finished fifth in 2005. In 2009 and 2012, he won the Thai Super Car Championship driving a Porsche 911 GT2. From 2017, he was entered in the Blancpain GT Series Asia, where in 2019 he won the overall GT3 class standing driving a Porsche 911 GT3 R.

In 2026, Vutthikorn will race for Car 918 of AAS by Absolute Racing, alongside 2023 Porsche Supercup Champion, Bastian Buus in the first round of the 2026 GT World Challenge Asia, before Bastian was replaced by 2024 World Endurance Championship LMGT3 Champion, Klaus Bachler for the second round.

== Personal life ==
Vutthikorn also has a son called Tasanapol Inthraphuvasak who races in the 2026 Formula 2 Championship with ART Grand Prix.

== Statistics ==
=== Complete 24 Hours of Le Mans results ===
Year	Team	Co-Drivers	Car	Class	Laps	Pos.	Class Pos.
2020	(Germany) Dempsey-Proton Racing	(France) Julien Andlauer (Switzerland) Lucas Légeret	Porsche 911 RSR	GTE; Am	331	36th	10th
2021	(Germany) Proton Competition	(France) Florian Latorre (United Kingdom) Harry Tincknell	Porsche 911 RSR-19	GTE; Am	66	DNF	DNF
