= Asian Touring Car Series =

Touring car racing series

- Category: Touring cars
- Country: East Asia
- Inaugural season: 2000
- Drivers' champion: (Chinese Taipei) Jun San Chen
- Teams' champion: Team AAI - Buddy Club
- Official website: afos.com

The Asian Touring Car Series (ATCS) is a touring car racing series that takes place each year across several Asian nations. It includes events at circuits in Malaysia, China and Indonesia. It ran as the Asian Touring Car Championship (ATCC) between 2000 and 2001, and 2005–2006.

The championship consists of three classes. Division 1 uses cars built to Super 2000 or BTC Touring regulations. Proton provides the only factory team, whose main opposition is the independent German BMW team of Engstler Motorsport. Division 2 uses Super Production regulations for cars with engine capacities of not more than 2000cc. Engstler Motorsport has a single entry in this class and is the main competition to the four-car line-up of DTM Bel’Air Racing from Hong Kong. Division 3 is a 1600cc class and is the most production-based of the three. Only DTM Bel’Air Racing fielded entries in this class during 2006.

== 2000 Super Production Era ==
In 2000, the ATCC moved from Super Touring to Super Production regulations. Reigning champion Charles Kwan, with his teammate Paul Chan and EKS Motorsports entered two BMW 320i to defend his title. Rival Henry Lee Junior joined WK Longman Racing to fight for the championship. Charles famously won the race at Shah Alam from the very back of the grid that year, but his car broke down in Zhuhai and Macau, allowing Henry Lee Junior to win.

In 2001, Charles Kwan moved with EKS Motorsport to race in the JGTC. WKS Longman Racing entered Thai driver Nattavude Charoensukhawatana in the championship and he won the title almost unopposed. The only serious rival he had was Chen Jun-San's Toyota Altezza of AAI Motorsports from Taiwan.

== Champions ==
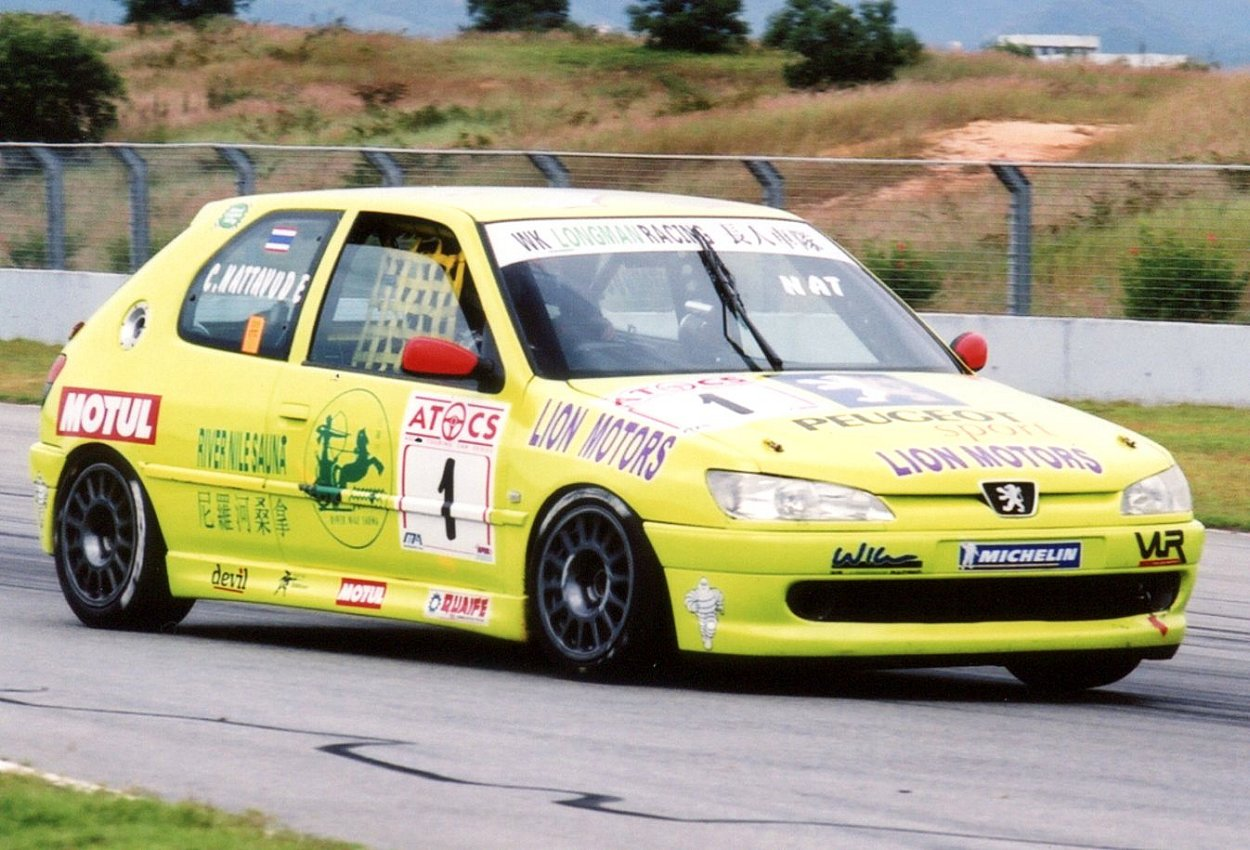
Thai driver C. Nattavude driving his Peugeot 306 GTi in the ATCC in Zhuhai in 2001.

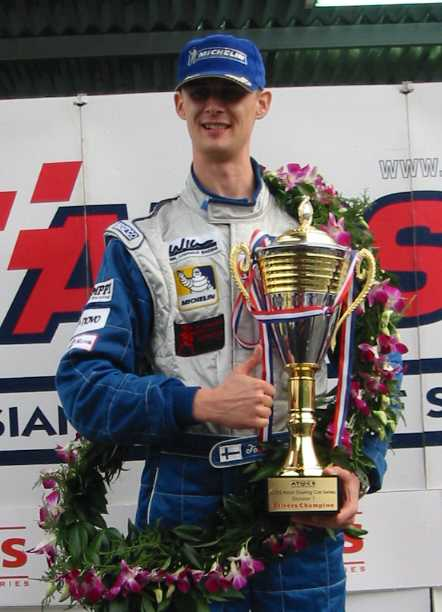
Toni Ruokonen, 2002 champion.

Season	Champion	Team Champion	Car
2000	(Hong Kong) Henry Lee Junior	WK Longman Racing	Peugeot 306 GTI
2001	(Thailand) Nattavude Charoensukhawatana	WK Longman Racing	Peugeot 306 GTI
2002	(Finland) Toni Ruokonen	WK Longman Racing	Peugeot 306 GTI
2003	(Hong Kong) Gary Sham Gai Tong	3 Crowns Racing	Honda Integra Type-R
2004	(Hong Kong) Ka Chun Lo	778 Autosport	Honda Integra Type-R; Honda Accord
2005	(Germany) Franz Engstler	Engstler Motorsport	BMW 320i
2006	(Germany) Franz Engstler	Engstler Motorsport	BMW 320i
2007	(Malaysia) Fariqe Hairuman	Petronas Syntium Team	BMW 320si
2008	(Thailand) Jack Lemvard	Engstler Motorsport	BMW 320si
2009	(Hong Kong) Cheung Chi Sing	Team IMSP	Honda Integra DC5
2010	(Hong Kong) Charles Ng	G.Harry Racing Team	Honda Integra DC5
2011	(Chinese Taipei) Jun San Chen	Team AAI - Buddy Club	Honda Civic FN2; Honda Accord

== See also ==
- TCR Asia Series
