= Bardinon =

Bardinon is a surname. Notable people with the surname include:

- Alexandre Bardinon (born 2002), French-Swiss racing driver
- Pierre Bardinon (1931–2012), French businessman and collector of Ferrari cars
