= Chinese Championship =

Chinese Championships or Chinese Championship may refer to:

Chinese National Championships

- Chinese Artistic Gymnastics Championships
- Chinese Athletics Championships
- Chinese Chess Championship
- Chinese Figure Skating Championships
- Chinese Go Championship
- Chinese Super League (football)

Other

- China Championship (snooker)
- China F4 Championship
- China Superbike Championship
- China Touring Car Championship
