= Chow Ho-Wan =

Chinese motorcycle racer

Chow Ho-Wan 周浩雲
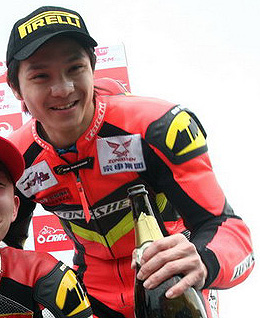
- Chow Ho-Wan celebrates his podim finish in the China Superbike Championship in 2008.
- Nationality: (China) Chinese
- Born: 15 April 1982 (age 44); Hong Kong
Motorcycle racing career statistics
250cc World Championship
Active years	2007-2008
Manufacturers	Aprilia
2008 championship position	NC (0 pts)
Starts / Wins / Podiums / Poles / F. laps / Points; 3 / 0 / 0 / 0 / 0 / 0
125cc World Championship
Active years	2005-2006
Manufacturers	Honda
2006 championship position	NC (0 pts)
Starts / Wins / Podiums / Poles / F. laps / Points; 2 / 0 / 0 / 0 / 0 / 0

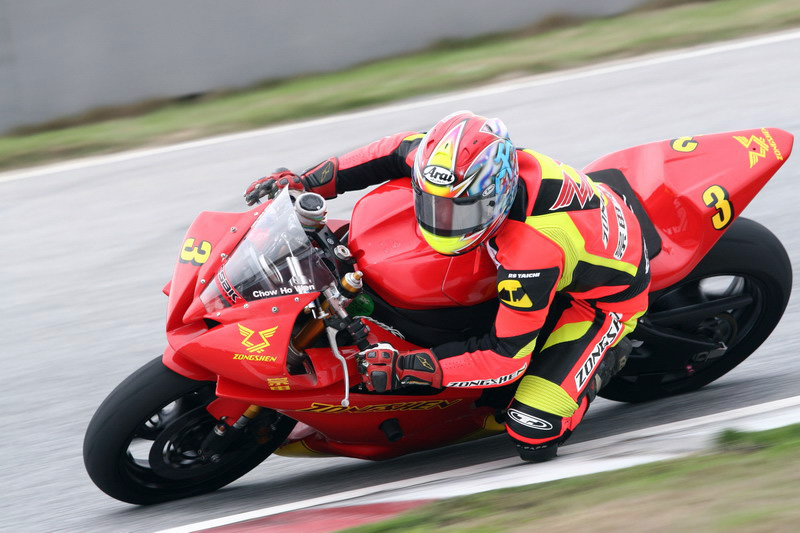
Chow Ho-Wan competing in the China Superbike Championship for Zongshen Racing.

Chow Ho-Wan (simplified Chinese: 周浩云; traditional Chinese: 周浩雲; pinyin: Zhōu Hàoyún; born 15 April 1982 in Hong Kong) is a Hong Kong racing rider. He has competed in the 250cc and 125cc World Championships, the Asian Road Racing Championship and the Chinese Superbike Championship. He is also the 2008 China Superbike Championship 600cc champion.

== Macau ACMC Trophy ==
Chow was a regular competitor in the now defunct ACMC Trophy motorcycle race, for 125cc motorbikes, part of the Macau Grand Prix. In 2000, Chow qualified fifth on a Honda RS125 and finished fourth. In 2001, Chow qualified 12th on a Yamaha TZ125 but failed to finish the race. In 2002, Chow qualified fourth and finished third. In 2003, the last time the race was held, he qualified third and finished second on a Honda RS125.

== Career statistics ==
2004 - NC, Superstock European Championship, Ducati 999

=== Superstock European Championship ===
==== Races by year ====
(key) (Races in bold indicate pole position) (Races in italics indicate fastest lap)

Year	Bike	1	2	3	4	5	6	7	8	9	Pos	Pts
2004	Ducati	VAL; DNQ	SMR	MNZ	OSC	SIL	BRA	NED	IMO	MAG	NC	0

=== Grand Prix motorcycle racing ===
==== By season ====
Season	Class	Motorcycle	Team	Number	Race	Win	Podium	Pole	FLap	Pts	Plcd
2005	125cc	Honda	Zongshen Racing Team	39	1	0	0	0	0	0	NC
2006	125cc	Honda	China Zongshen Team	86	1	0	0	0	0	0	NC
2007	250cc	Aprilia	Zongshen Team of China	89	2	0	0	0	0	0	NC
2008	250cc	Aprilia	Zongshen Team of China	89	1	0	0	0	0	0	NC
Total					**5**	**0**	**0**	**0**	**0**	**0**	

===== Races by year =====
(key)

Year	Class	Bike	1	2	3	4	5	6	7	8	9	10	11	12	13	14	15	16	17	Pos.	Pts
2005	125cc	Honda	SPA	POR	CHN; 31	FRA	ITA	CAT	NED	GBR	GER	CZE	JPN	MAL	QAT	AUS	TUR	VAL		**NC**	0
2006	125cc	Honda	SPA	QAT	TUR	CHN; DSQ	FRA	ITA	CAT	NED	GBR	GER	CZE	MAL	AUS	JPN	POR	VAL		**NC**	0
2007	250cc	Aprilia	QAT	SPA	TUR	CHN	FRA	ITA	CAT	GBR	NED	GER	CZE; DNQ	RSM	POR; 17	JPN	AUS; Ret	MAL	VAL	**NC**	0
2008	250cc	Aprilia	QAT	SPA	POR; Ret	CHN	FRA; DNQ	ITA	CAT	GBR	NED	GER; DNQ	CZE	RSM	INP	JPN	AUS; DNQ	MAL	VAL	**NC**	0
