= Ho-Pin Tung =

Dutch-born racing driver (born 1982)

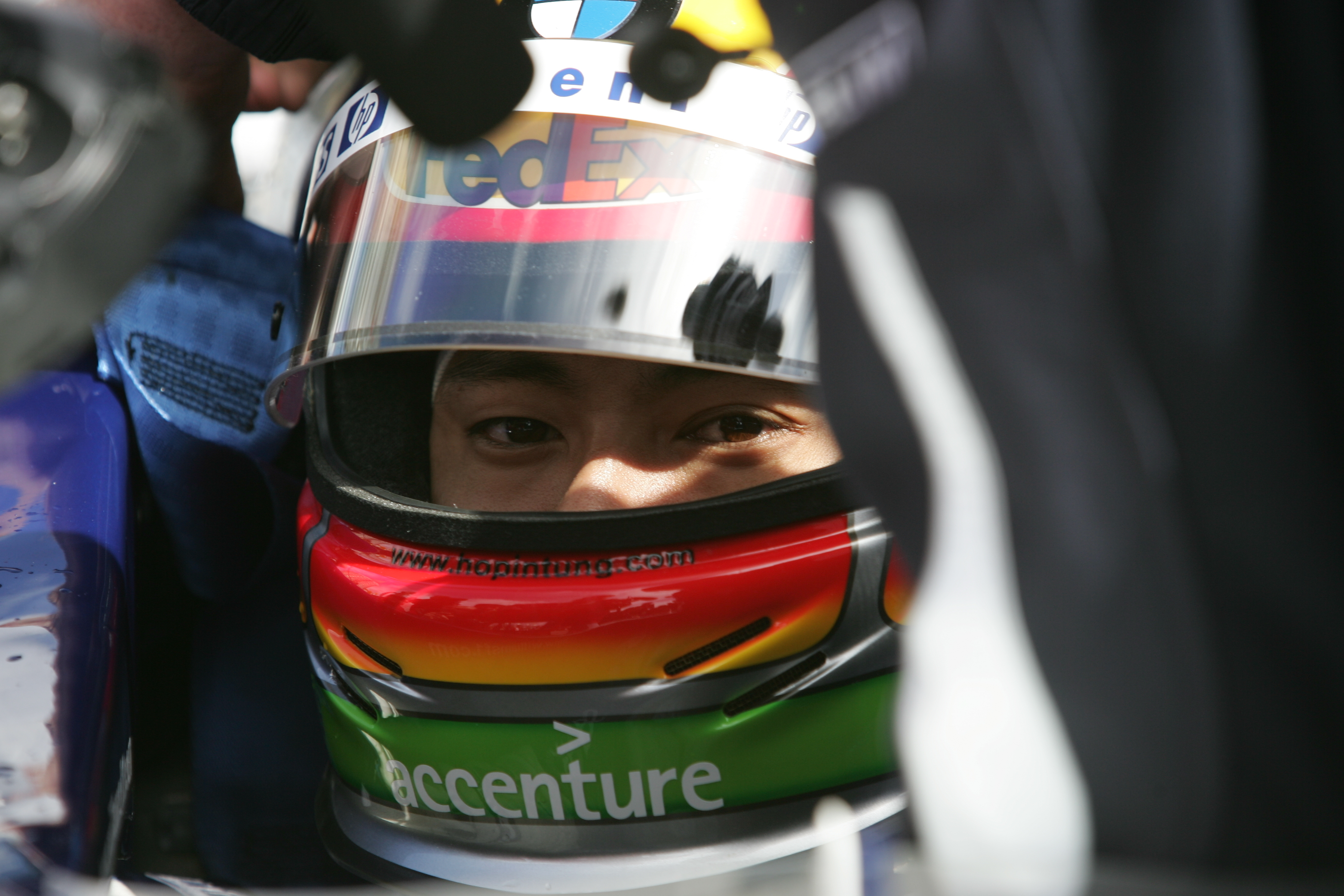
- Tung at the Monaco aan de Maas event in 2005
- Nationality: Chinese; Dutch via dual nationality
- Born: 4 December 1982 (age 43) Velp, Netherlands

FIA World Endurance Championship career
- Debut season: 2013
- Current team: Jackie Chan DC Racing
- Categorisation: FIA Gold (until 2025); FIA Silver (2026–)
- Car number: 37
- Former teams: KCMG; OAK Racing; Pegasus Racing; Baxi DC Racing
- Starts: 34
- Championships: 0
- Wins: 7
- Poles: 5
- Fastest laps: 1
- Best finish: 2nd in 2017, 2018-19
- Finished last season: 2nd

Previous series
- 2015–16 2015 2014–15 2014 2013–14 2012–15 2011 2011 2009, 2011 2008 2008 2007–08, 2010 2006–07, 2008–09 2004–06 2003 2002 2001: Asian Le Mans Series – LMP3; GT Asia Series; Formula E United SportsCar – Prototype; Asian Le Mans Series – LMP2; Porsche Carrera Cup Asia; IndyCar Series; FIA GT1 World Championship; Superleague Formula; International GT Open; GP2 Asia Series; GP2 Series; A1 Grand Prix; ATS Formel 3 Cup; Formula BMW Asia; FBMW Junior Cup Iberia; Formula Ford 1800 Benelux

Championship titles
- 2015–16 2014 2006 2003: Asian Le Mans Series – LMP3; Asian Le Mans Series – LMP2; ATS Formel 3 Cup; Formula BMW Asia

Awards
- 2001: KNAF Talent First

Ho-Pin Tung
- Chinese: 董荷斌
Transcriptions
Standard Mandarin
- Hanyu Pinyin: Dǒng Hébīn [tʊ̀ŋ xɤ̌pín]
- Gwoyeu Romatzyh: Doong Her-Bin
- Wade–Giles: Tung He-Pin

Ho-Pin Tung (Chinese: 董荷斌; pinyin: Dǒng Hébīn; born December 4, 1982) is a Dutch-born racing driver who races with a Chinese license.

== Career ==
Tung was born in Velp, Gelderland, Netherlands, to Chinese parents with ancestry tracing to Wenzhou, Zhejiang Province. He started kart racing in the Netherlands in 1997 before graduating to single-seaters. In 2001, he raced in the Dutch Formula Ford championship with Van Amersfoort Racing. After winning the 2003 Formula BMW Asia series, he was rewarded with a test drive with the Williams F1 team.

In 2004, Tung joined the ATS Formel 3 Cup. Although he scored race wins and podium finishes, he finished seventh in his rookie year.

Tung stayed in the ATS F3 Cup in 2005, finishing the series in third place, before taking the title in 2006, winning nine races, four pole positions and five fastest laps.

At the 2007 Chinese Grand Prix, Tung was announced as a test driver for the BMW Sauber F1 Team the rest of the year.

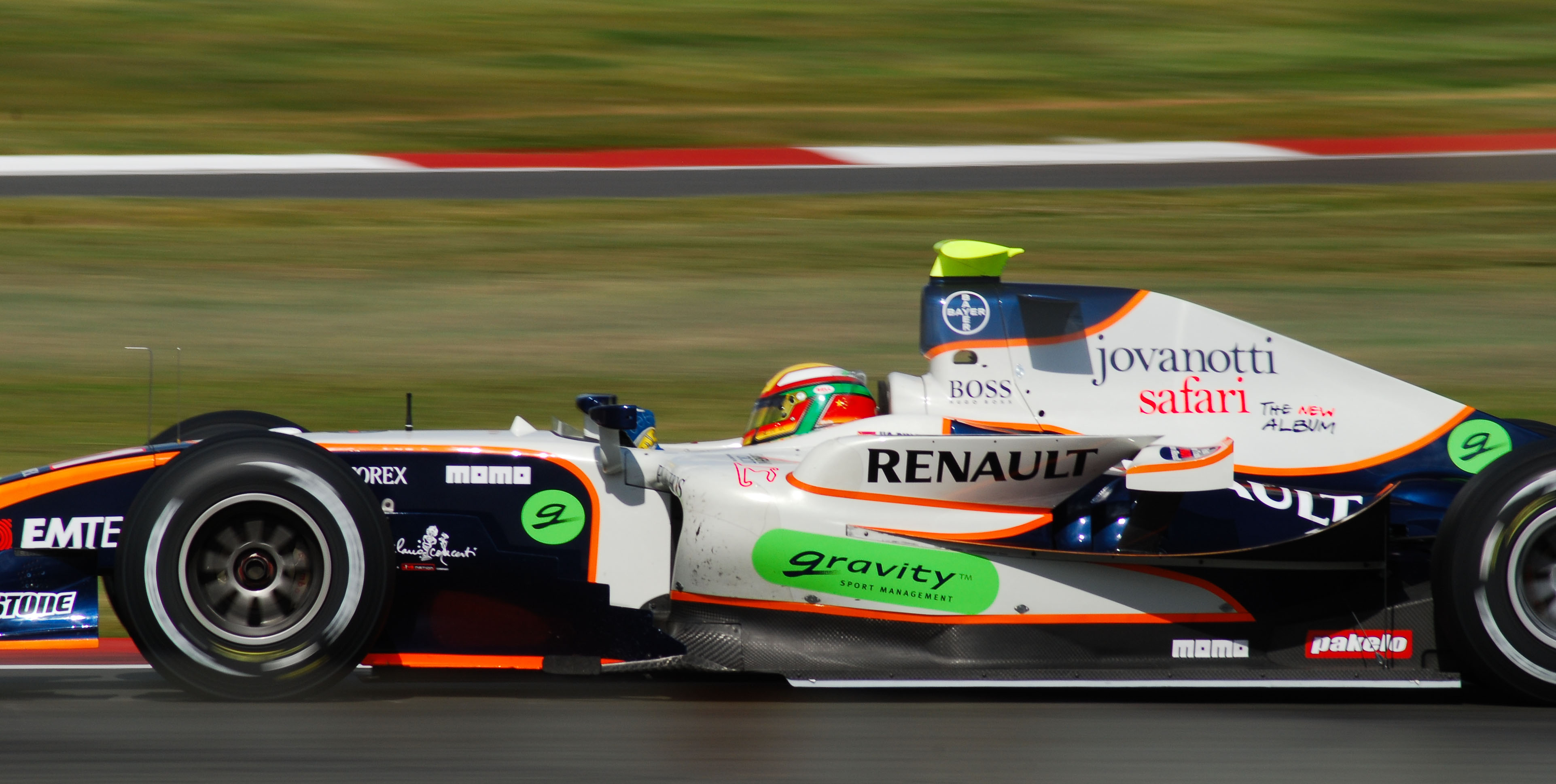
Tung driving for Trident Racing at the Silverstone round of the 2008 GP2 Series season.

On 4 April 2007, BCN Competición announced that it had signed Tung as its second driver alongside Japanese driver Sakon Yamamoto for the 2007 GP2 Series.

Tung drove for Trident Racing team in the 2008 GP2 Asia Series and GP2 Series, scoring his first podium finish in the latter.

In 2009, Tung raced in the Superleague Formula series. He raced in the first three rounds for Galatasaray S.K. and the latter three rounds for Atlético Madrid. He had his first win in the series at the Jarama round for Galatasaray.

In December 2009, Tung tested for the Renault F1 Team. In January, he was announced as the team's third driver. As part of the deal, he returned to the GP2 Series with the DAMS team for the 2010 GP2 Series season.

On 23 June 2010, the FIA granted Tung a four-race probationary FIA Super Licence, allowing him to compete in Formula One.

At the Hungaroring round of the GP2 season, Tung sustained a minor fracture of one of his lumbar vertebrae as a result of a first-lap collision with Jules Bianchi, who spun in front of him and suffered a more serious break of the same bone. Tung was replaced by Romain Grosjean while he recovered. However, Grosjean kept the seat for the remainder of the season, leaving Tung without a drive until he was called up to replace Christian Vietoris at Racing Engineering for the final round, Vietoris suffering from appendicitis.

=== IndyCar ===
On 22 November 2010, Tung made sporting history as he officially became the first Chinese licensed driver to take the wheel of an IndyCar by testing with the FAZZT Race Team at Sebring International Raceway.

Tung attempted to qualify for the 2011 Indianapolis 500 with Dragon Racing, but was unsuccessful due to a crash on Pole Day that resulted in a mild concussion. He made his IndyCar debut later that season in August at Infineon Raceway, driving for the same team.

=== Sportscars ===
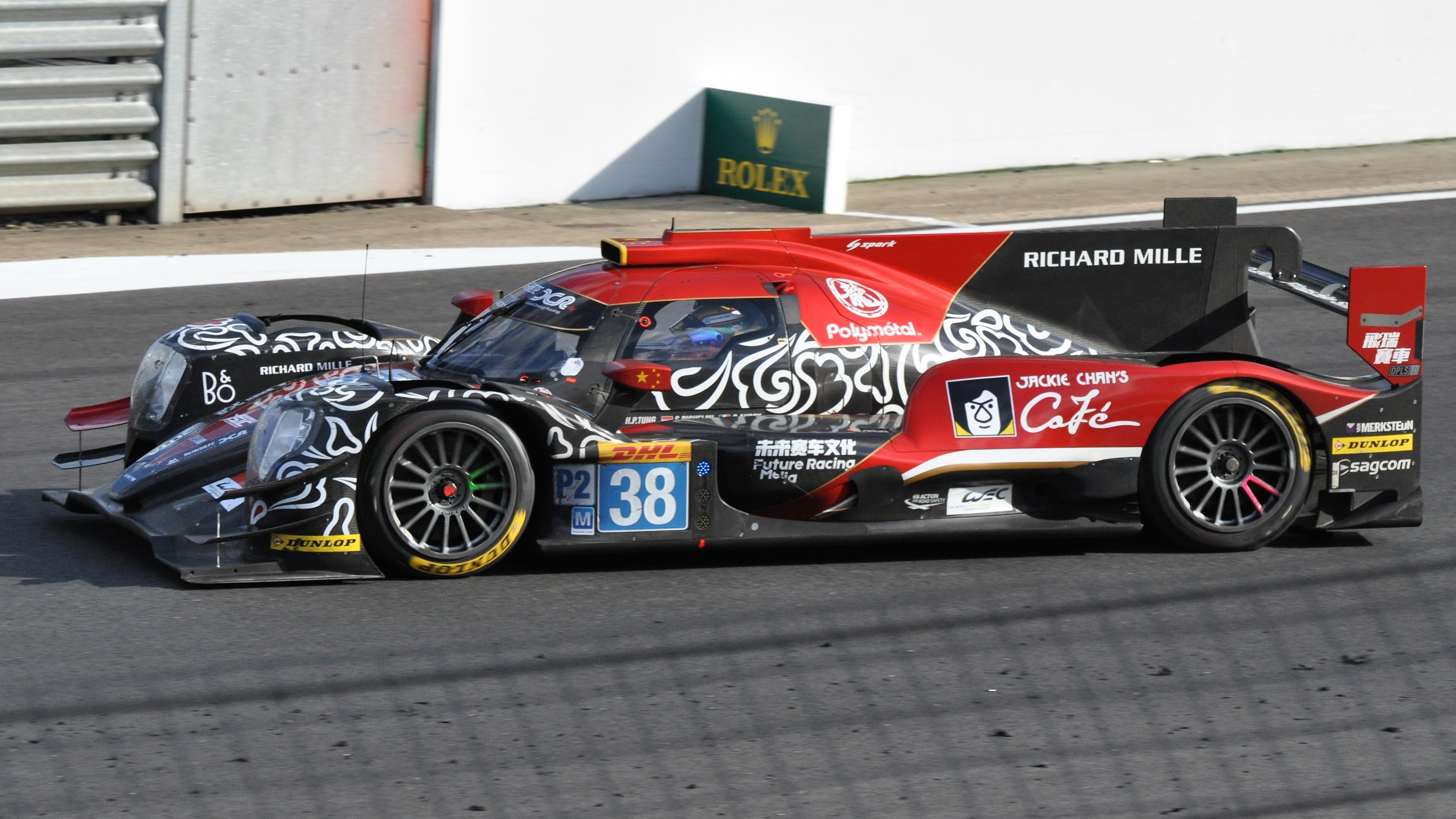
Tung at the wheel of the #38 Jackie Chan DC Racing Oreca 07 car, during the 2018 6 Hours of Silverstone race

In 2016, Tung joined Baxi DC Racing to partner team owner David Cheng and French driver Nelson Panciatici (replaced mid-year by Paul-Loup Chatin) in the team's Alpine A460 entry for the LMP2 class of the 2016 FIA World Endurance Championship. The team took a string of minor points placings during the year, and Tung finished the season in 13th position in the drivers' championship standings.

Tung remained with DC, now renamed Jackie Chan DC Racing, for the 2017 FIA World Endurance Championship. At the 2017 24 Hours of Le Mans, Tung became the first driver in the event's history to lead the race in an LMP2 car, after all the top class LMP1 entries either retired or faded away in the race. Ultimately, his Oreca 07 car finished second overall, and first in the LMP2 class, after it was overtaken by the No. 2 Porsche 919 Hybrid car. The Jackie Chan DC crew were also the first Chinese-entered car to win a class in the 24 Hours of Le Mans. During the remainder of the season, Tung and his co-drivers Oliver Jarvis and Thomas Laurent took further class wins at Silverstone and the Nürburgring, and two other podium finishes, and finished the season in second place in the LMP2 championship.

Tung remained with Jackie Chan DC Racing for a third season in 2018, to contest the 2018-19 FIA World Endurance Championship 'superseason'.

== Racing record ==
=== Racing career summary ===
| Season | Series | Team | Races | Wins | Poles | FLaps | Podiums | Points | Position |
|---|---|---|---|---|---|---|---|---|---|
| 2001 | Formula Ford 1800 Benelux | Van Amersfoort Racing | 11 | 1 | 1 | 0 | 1 | 65 | 6th |
| 2001 | Formula Ford Festival | Van Amersfoort Racing | 1 | 0 | 0 | 0 | 0 | N/A | NC |
| 2002 | Formula BMW Junior Cup | Baviera S.A. | 3 | 0 | 0 | 0 | 1 | 62 | 15th |
| 2003 | Formula BMW Asia | Team Meritus | 14 | 10 | 12 | 10 | 13 | 225 | **1st** |
| 2003 | Formula One | BMW WilliamsF1 Team | Test driver | | | | | | |
| 2004 | German Formula Three Championship | Van Amersfoort Racing | 18 | 0 | 0 | 1 | 4 | 111 | 7th |
| 2004 | Macau Grand Prix | Hitech Racing | 1 | 0 | 0 | 0 | 0 | N/A | 16th |
| 2004 | Bahrain Superprix | Hitech Racing | 1 | 0 | 0 | 0 | 0 | N/A | NC |
| 2005 | German Formula Three Championship | JB Motorsport | 17 | 2 | 1 | 2 | 7 | 86 | **3rd** |
| 2005 | Masters of Formula 3 | JB Motorsport | 1 | 0 | 0 | 0 | 0 | N/A | 16th |
| 2006 | German Formula Three Championship | JB Motorsport | 20 | 9 | 4 | 5 | 11 | 145 | **1st** |
| 2006 | Masters of Formula 3 | JB Motorsport | 1 | 0 | 0 | 0 | 0 | N/A | NC |
| 2006–07 | A1 Grand Prix | A1 Team China | 10 | 0 | 0 | 0 | 1 | 22‡ | 15th‡ |
| 2007 | GP2 Series | BCN Competición | 21 | 0 | 0 | 0 | 0 | 4 | 23rd |
| 2007 | Formula One | BMW Sauber F1 Team | Test driver | | | | | | |
| 2008 | GP2 Series | Trident Racing | 20 | 0 | 0 | 0 | 1 | 7 | 18th |
| 2008 | GP2 Asia Series | Trident Racing | 10 | 0 | 0 | 0 | 0 | 1 | 21st |
| 2008 | International GT Open - GTS | Scuderia Latorre | 2 | 1 | 1 | 0 | 1 | 14 | 18th |
| 2008–09 | A1 Grand Prix | A1 Team China | 10 | 0 | 0 | 0 | 0 | 7‡ | 18th‡ |
| 2009 | Superleague Formula | Atlético Madrid | 6 | 1 | 0 | 0 | 1 | 202‡ | 15th‡ |
| 2009 | Superleague Formula | Galatasaray S.K. | 6 | 0 | 1 | 0 | 1 | 239‡ | 11th‡ |
| 2009 | Formula One | Renault F1 Team | Test driver | | | | | | |
| 2010 | GP2 Series | DAMS | 15 | 0 | 0 | 0 | 0 | 0 | 28th |
| 2010 | Formula One | Renault F1 Team | Reserve driver | | | | | | |
| 2011 | IndyCar Series | Dragon Racing | 2 | 0 | 0 | 0 | 0 | 10 | 45th |
| 2011 | FIA GT1 World Championship | Exim Bank Team China | 4 | 0 | 0 | 0 | 0 | 0 | NC |
| 2011 | Superleague Formula | China | 3 | 0 | 0 | 0 | 0 | 34‡ | 14th‡ |
| 2012 | Porsche Carrera Cup Asia | Budweiser Team Starchase | 11 | 0 | 0 | 0 | 3 | 130 | 5th |
| 2013 | Porsche Carrera Cup Asia | Budweiser Kamlung Racing | 12 | 1 | 0 | 0 | 2 | 123 | 5th |
| 2013 | Asian Le Mans Series - LMP2 | OAK Racing | 3 | 2 | 2 | 1 | 3 | 70 | **3rd** |
| 2013 | 24 Hours of Le Mans - LMP2 | KCMG | 1 | 0 | 0 | 0 | 0 | N/A | NC |
| 2014 | Porsche Carrera Cup Asia | Budweiser Team Absolute Racing | 11 | 0 | 0 | 0 | 1 | 135 | 5th |
| 2014 | Asian Le Mans Series - LMP2 | OAK Racing Team Total | 4 | 4 | 3 | 2 | 4 | 103 | **1st** |
| 2014 | United SportsCar Championship - Prototype | OAK Racing | 3 | 0 | 0 | 2 | 1 | 80 | 27th |
| 2014 | 24 Hours of Le Mans - LMP2 | OAK Racing Team Asia | 1 | 0 | 0 | 0 | 0 | N/A | 7th |
| 2014–15 | Formula E | China Racing Formula E Team | 3 | 0 | 0 | 0 | 0 | 0 | 26th |
| 2015 | Porsche Carrera Cup Asia | Budweiser Team Absolute Racing | 14 | 2 | 0 | 1 | 6 | 161 | 4th |
| 2015 | GT Asia Series | Absolute Racing | 4 | 0 | 0 | 0 | 0 | 3 | 51st |
| 2015 | 24 Hours of Le Mans - LMP2 | Pegasus Racing | 1 | 0 | 0 | 0 | 0 | N/A | 9th |
| 2015–16 | Asian Le Mans Series - LMP3 | DC Racing | 4 | 4 | 3 | 3 | 4 | 103 | **1st** |
| 2016 | FIA World Endurance Championship - LMP2 | Baxi DC Racing Alpine | 9 | 0 | 0 | 0 | 0 | 40 | 13th |
| 2016 | 24 Hours of Le Mans - LMP2 | Baxi DC Racing Alpine | 1 | 0 | 0 | 0 | 0 | N/A | NC |
| 2016–17 | Asian Le Mans Series - LMP2 | Jackie Chan DC Racing | 4 | 2 | 1 | 1 | 3 | 69 | **3rd** |
| 2016–17 | Formula E | Panasonic Jaguar Racing | Reserve driver | | | | | | |
| 2017 | FIA World Endurance Championship - LMP2 | Jackie Chan DC Racing | 9 | 3 | 0 | 1 | 6 | 175 | **2nd** |
| 2017 | 24 Hours of Le Mans - LMP2 | Jackie Chan DC Racing | 1 | 1 | 0 | 0 | 1 | N/A | **1st** |
| 2017 | Blancpain GT Series Asia - GT3 | FFF Racing Team by ACM | 2 | 0 | 0 | 0 | 0 | 0 | NC |
| 2017–18 | Asian Le Mans Series - LMP2 | Jackie Chan DC Racing × Jota | 1 | 0 | 0 | 0 | 0 | 0 | 11th |
| 2017–18 | Formula E | Panasonic Jaguar Racing | Reserve driver | | | | | | |
| 2018 | IMSA SportsCar Championship - Prototype | Jackie Chan DCR JOTA | 1 | 0 | 0 | 0 | 0 | 26 | 51st |
| 2018 | 24 Hours of Le Mans - LMP2 | Jackie Chan DC Racing | 1 | 0 | 0 | 0 | 0 | N/A | 6th |
| 2018–19 | FIA World Endurance Championship - LMP2 | Jackie Chan DC Racing | 8 | 2 | 1 | 0 | 5 | 166 | **2nd** |
| 2018–19 | Formula E | Panasonic Jaguar Racing | Reserve driver | | | | | | |
| 2019 | 24 Hours of Le Mans - LMP2 | Jackie Chan DC Racing | 1 | 0 | 0 | 0 | 1 | N/A | **2nd** |
| 2019–20 | FIA World Endurance Championship - LMP2 | Jackie Chan DC Racing | 8 | 0 | 0 | 0 | 1 | 69 | 8th |
| 2020 | 24 Hours of Le Mans - LMP2 | Jackie Chan DC Racing | 1 | 0 | 0 | 0 | 0 | N/A | NC |
| 2023 | Super Taikyū - ST-X | KCMG | 7 | 0 | 0 | 1 | 2 | 85‡ | 6th‡ |
| 2025 | Super Taikyu - ST-Z | Progress Racing | | | | | | | |
| 2025 | Lamborghini Super Trofeo Asia - Pro-Am | Z.SPEED | 1 | 0 | 0 | 0 | 0 | 18 | 10th |
| 2025–26 | 24H Series Middle East - TCX | KCMG | | | | | | | |
| 2026 | Super Taikyu - ST-X | Team Pop Race | | | | | | | |

‡ Team standings.

=== Complete Formula BMW Asia results ===
(key)

| Year | Entrant | 1 | 2 | 3 | 4 | 5 | 6 | 7 | 8 | 9 | 10 | 11 | 12 | 13 | 14 | DC | Points |
|---|---|---|---|---|---|---|---|---|---|---|---|---|---|---|---|---|---|
| 2003 | Team Meritus | **SEP1**; **1**; 1 | **SEP1**; **2**; 1 | **SEP2**; **1**; 1 | SEP2; 2 Ret | **JOH**; **1**; 2 | **JOH**; **2**; 1 | **BIR**; **1**; 1 | **BIR**; **2**; 1 | **TAE**; **1**; 1 | **TAE**; **2**; 1 | **AUT**; **1**; 1 | **AUT**; **2**; 1 | BEI; 1; 4 | BEI; 2 Ret | 1st | 205 |

=== Complete ATS Formel 3 Cup results ===
(key)

| Year | Entrant | 1 | 2 | 3 | 4 | 5 | 6 | 7 | 8 | 9 | 10 | 11 | 12 | 13 | 14 | 15 | 16 | 17 | 18 | 19 | 20 | DC | Points |
|---|---|---|---|---|---|---|---|---|---|---|---|---|---|---|---|---|---|---|---|---|---|---|---|
| 2004 | Van Amersfoort Racing | HOC; 1; 8 | HOC; 2; 6 | OSC1; 1 Ret | OSC1; 2; 2 | ASS; 1 Ret | ASS; 2; 4 | LAU1; 1; 12 | LAU1; 2; 6 | NÜR1; 1; 3 | NÜR1; 2; 4 | SAC; 1; 5 | SAC; 2; 11 | NÜR2; 1; 3 | NÜR2; 2 Ret | LAU2; 1 Ret | LAU2; 2; 6 | OSC2; 1; 2 | OSC2; 2; 5 | | | 7th | 111 |
| 2005 | JB Motorsport | OSC1; 1; 1 | OSC1; 2; 3 | HOC; 1; 4 | HOC; 2; 4 | SAC; 1; 16 | SAC; 2 Ret | LAU1; 1 DNS | LAU1; 2 Ret | NÜR1; 1; 4 | NÜR1; 2; 3 | NÜR2; 1; 4 | **NÜR2**; **2**; 2 | ASS; 1; 6 | ASS; 2; 5 | LAU2; 1 Ret | LAU2; 2; 2 | OSC2; 1; 2 | **OSC2**; **2**; 1 | | | 3rd | 88 |
| 2006 | JB Motorsport | OSC1; 1; 1 | OSC1; 2; 6 | HOC; 1; 6 | HOC; 2; 5 | **LAU1**; **1**; 1 | LAU1; 2; 1 | NÜR1; 1; 5 | NÜR1; 2; 2 | NÜR2; 1; 1 | **NÜR2**; **2**; 1 | ASS1; 1; 6 | ASS1; 2; 5 | LAU2; 1; 1 | LAU2; 2; 7 | ASS2; 1; 6 | ASS2; 2; 5 | SAL; 1; 2 | SAL; 2; 1 | **OSC2**; **1**; 1 | **OSC2**; **2**; 1 | 1st | 145 |

=== Complete A1 Grand Prix results ===
(key)

| Year | Entrant | 1 | 2 | 3 | 4 | 5 | 6 | 7 | 8 | 9 | 10 | 11 | 12 | 13 | 14 | 15 | 16 | 17 | 18 | 19 | 20 | 21 | 22 | DC | Points |
|---|---|---|---|---|---|---|---|---|---|---|---|---|---|---|---|---|---|---|---|---|---|---|---|---|---|
| 2006–07 | China | NED; SPR | NED; FEA | CZE; SPR | CZE; FEA | CHN; SPR | CHN; FEA | MYS; SPR | MYS; FEA | IDN; SPR; Ret | IDN; FEA; 13 | NZL; SPR; 13 | NZL; FEA; 9 | AUS; SPR; 6 | AUS; FEA; 3 | RSA; SPR; 14 | RSA; FEA; Ret | MEX; SPR; 6 | MEX; FEA; 10 | CHN; SPR | CHN; FEA | GBR; SPR | GBR; SPR | 15th | 22 |
| 2008–09 | China | NED; SPR; 13 | NED; FEA; 9 | CHN; SPR; 17 | CHN; FEA; 12 | MYS; SPR; 10 | MYS; FEA; 9 | NZL; SPR | NZL; FEA | RSA; SPR; 13 | RSA; FEA; Ret | POR; SPR; 16 | POR; FEA; 8 | GBR; SPR | GBR; SPR | | | | | | | | | 17th | 4 |

=== Complete GP2 Series results ===
(key)

| Year | Entrant | 1 | 2 | 3 | 4 | 5 | 6 | 7 | 8 | 9 | 10 | 11 | 12 | 13 | 14 | 15 | 16 | 17 | 18 | 19 | 20 | 21 | DC | Points |
|---|---|---|---|---|---|---|---|---|---|---|---|---|---|---|---|---|---|---|---|---|---|---|---|---|
| 2007 | BCN Competición | BHR; FEA; 15 | BHR; SPR; Ret | CAT; FEA; 11 | CAT; SPR; Ret | MON; FEA; 13 | MAG; FEA; 14 | MAG; SPR; 17 | SIL; FEA; 17 | SIL; SPR; 15 | NÜR; FEA; 16 | NÜR; SPR; 22† | HUN; FEA; 9 | HUN; SPR; Ret | IST; FEA; 9 | IST; SPR; 9 | MNZ; FEA; Ret | MNZ; SPR; 16† | SPA; FEA; 8 | SPA; SPR; 4 | VAL; FEA; 11 | VAL; SPR; 11 | 23rd | 4 |
| 2008 | Trident Racing | CAT; FEA; Ret | CAT; SPR; 14 | IST; FEA; 11 | IST; SPR; Ret | MON; FEA; 7 | MON; SPR; 2 | MAG; FEA; Ret | MAG; SPR; 14 | SIL; FEA; 18 | SIL; SPR; Ret | HOC; FEA; 13 | HOC; SPR; 7 | HUN; FEA; Ret | HUN; SPR; 14 | VAL; FEA; Ret | VAL; SPR; 9 | SPA; FEA; 15 | SPA; SPR; 10 | MNZ; FEA; Ret | MNZ; SPR; 8 | | 18th | 7 |
| 2010 | DAMS | CAT; FEA; 13 | CAT; SPR; 10 | MON; FEA; Ret | MON; SPR; Ret | IST; FEA; 11 | IST; SPR; 9 | VAL; FEA; Ret | VAL; SPR; 13 | SIL; FEA; Ret | SIL; SPR; 15 | HOC; FEA; Ret | HOC; SPR; 14 | HUN; FEA; Ret | HUN; SPR; DNS | SPA; FEA | SPA; SPR | MNZ; FEA | MNZ; SPR | | | | 28th | 0 |
| 2010 | Racing Engineering | | | | | | | | | | | | | | | | | | | YMC; FEA; Ret | YMC; SPR; 13 | | 28th | 0 |

==== Complete GP2 Asia Series results ====
(key)

| Year | Entrant | 1 | 2 | 3 | 4 | 5 | 6 | 7 | 8 | 9 | 10 | DC | Points |
|---|---|---|---|---|---|---|---|---|---|---|---|---|---|
| 2008 | Trident Racing | DUB; FEA; 22 | DUB; SPR; 10 | SEN; FEA; Ret | SEN; SPR; 6 | SEP; FEA; Ret | SEP; SPR; 16 | BHR; FEA; Ret | BHR; SPR; 7 | DUB; FEA; 10 | DUB; SPR; DSQ | 21st | 1 |

=== Superleague Formula ===
(Races in bold indicate pole position)

| Year | Team | 1 | 2 | 3 | 4 | 5 | 6 | 7 | 8 | 9 | 10 | 11 | 12 | Position | Points |
|---|---|---|---|---|---|---|---|---|---|---|---|---|---|---|---|
| 2009 | Atlético Madrid Alan Docking Racing | MAG; 1; 14 | MAG; 2; 12 | ZOL; 1; 18 | ZOL; 2; 2 | DON; 1; 9 | DON; 2; 7 | | | | | | | 15th | 202 |
| 2009 | Galatasaray S.K. Ultimate Motorsport | | | | | | | EST; 1; 17 | **EST**; **2**; 7 | MNZ; 1; 8 | MNZ; 2; 7 | JAR; 1; 16 | JAR; 2; 1 | 11th | 239 |
| 2011 | China Emilio de Villota Motorsport | ASS; 1; 10 | ASS; 2; 11 | ZOL; 1 | ZOL; 2 | | | | | | | | | 14th | 34 |

==== Super Final Results ====
| Year | Team | 1 | 2 | 3 | 4 | 5 | 6 |
|---|---|---|---|---|---|---|---|
| 2009 | Atlético Madrid Alan Docking Racing | MAG; DNQ | ZOL; C | DON; DNQ | | | |
| 2009 | Galatasaray S.K. Ultimate Motorsport | | | | EST; DNQ | MNZ; C | JAR; 4 |
| 2011 | China Emilio de Villota Motorsport | HOL; DNQ | BEL | | | | |

=== American Open-Wheel racing results ===
(key)

==== IndyCar ====
| Year | Team | No. | Chassis | Engine | 1 | 2 | 3 | 4 | 5 | 6 | 7 | 8 | 9 | 10 | 11 | 12 | 13 | 14 | 15 | 16 | 17 | 18 | Rank | Points | Ref |
|---|---|---|---|---|---|---|---|---|---|---|---|---|---|---|---|---|---|---|---|---|---|---|---|---|---|
| 2011 | Dragon Racing | 8 | Dallara | Honda | STP | ALA | LBH | SAO | INDY; DNQ | TXS | TXS | MIL | IOW | TOR | EDM | MDO | NHM | | | | | | 45th | 10 | |
| 2011 | Dragon Racing | 88 | Dallara | Honda | | | | | | | | | | | | | | SNM; 27 | BAL | MOT | KTY | LVS | 45th | 10 | |

| Years | Teams | Races | Poles | Wins | Top 5s | Top 10s | Indianapolis 500 Wins | Championships |
|---|---|---|---|---|---|---|---|---|
| 1 | 1 | 1 | 0 | 0 | 0 | 0 | 0 | 0 |

==== Indianapolis 500 ====
| Year | Chassis | Engine | Start | Finish | Team |
|---|---|---|---|---|---|
| 2011 | Dallara | Honda | DNQ | | Dragon Racing |

=== Complete GT1 World Championship results ===
| Year | Team | Car | 1 | 2 | 3 | 4 | 5 | 6 | 7 | 8 | 9 | 10 | 11 | 12 | 13 | 14 | 15 | 16 | 17 | 18 | 19 | 20 | Pos | Points |
|---|---|---|---|---|---|---|---|---|---|---|---|---|---|---|---|---|---|---|---|---|---|---|---|---|
| 2011 | Exim Bank Team China | Chevrolet Corvette C6.R | ABU; QR | ABU; CR | ZOL; QR | ZOL; CR | ALG; QR | ALG; CR | SAC; QR | SAC; CR | SIL; QR | SIL; CR | NAV; QR | NAV; CR | PRI; QR | PRI; CR | ORD; QR; Ret | ORD; CR; 12 | BEI; QR; 14 | BEI; CR; 11 | SAN; QR | SAN; CR | 39th | 0 |

=== 24 Hours of Le Mans results ===
| Year | Team | Co-Drivers | Car | Class | Laps | Pos. | Class Pos. |
|---|---|---|---|---|---|---|---|
| 2013 | (China) KCMG | (Switzerland) Alexandre Imperatori (United Kingdom) Matthew Howson | Morgan LMP2-Nissan | LMP2 | 241 | DNF | DNF |
| 2014 | (France) OAK Racing-Team Asia | (China) David Cheng (Hong Kong) Adderly Fong | Ligier JS P2-Honda | LMP2 | 347 | 11th | 7th |
| 2015 | (Germany) Pegasus Racing | (Hong Kong) David Cheng (France) Léo Roussel | Morgan LMP2-Nissan | LMP2 | 334 | 19th | 9th |
| 2016 | (China) Baxi DC Racing Alpine | (United States) David Cheng (France) Nelson Panciatici | Alpine A460-Nissan | LMP2 | 234 | DNF | DNF |
| 2017 | (China) Jackie Chan DC Racing | (France) Thomas Laurent (United Kingdom) Oliver Jarvis | Oreca 07-Gibson | LMP2 | 366 | **2nd** | **1st** |
| 2018 | (China) Jackie Chan DC Racing | (France) Gabriel Aubry (Monaco) Stéphane Richelmi | Oreca 07-Gibson | LMP2 | 356 | 10th | 6th |
| 2019 | (China) Jackie Chan DC Racing | (France) Gabriel Aubry (Monaco) Stéphane Richelmi | Oreca 07-Gibson | LMP2 | 367 | 7th | **2nd** |
| 2020 | (China) Jackie Chan DC Racing | (France) Gabriel Aubry (United Kingdom) Will Stevens | Oreca 07-Gibson | LMP2 | 141 | DSQ | DSQ |

=== Complete WeatherTech SportsCar Championship results ===
(key) (Races in bold indicate pole position; races in italics indicate fastest lap.)

| Year | Team | Class | Make | Engine | 1 | 2 | 3 | 4 | 5 | 6 | 7 | 8 | 9 | 10 | 11 | Pos. | Pts |
|---|---|---|---|---|---|---|---|---|---|---|---|---|---|---|---|---|---|
| 2014 | OAK Racing | P | Morgan LMP2 | Nissan VK45DE 4.5 V8 | DAY | SEB | LBH | LGA | DET | WGL; 2 | MOS | IMS; 8 | ELK | COA | | 27th | 80 |
| 2014 | OAK Racing | P | Ligier JS P2 | Honda HR28TT 2.8 L V6 Turbo | | | | | | | | | | | PET; 9 | 27th | 80 |
| 2018 | Jackie Chan DCR JOTA | P | Oreca 07 | Gibson GK428 4.2 L V8 | DAY; 5 | SEB | LBH | MDO | DET | WGL | MOS | ELK | LGA | PET | | 51st | 26 |

=== Complete Formula E results ===
(key)

| Year | Team | Chassis | Powertrain | 1 | 2 | 3 | 4 | 5 | 6 | 7 | 8 | 9 | 10 | 11 | Pos | Points |
|---|---|---|---|---|---|---|---|---|---|---|---|---|---|---|---|---|
| 2014–15 | China Racing | Spark SRT01-e | SRT01-e | BEI; 16 | PUT; 11 | PDE | BUE; 11 | MIA | LBH | MCO | BER | MSC | LDN | LDN | 26th | 0 |

=== Complete FIA World Endurance Championship results ===
| Year | Entrant | Class | Car | Engine | 1 | 2 | 3 | 4 | 5 | 6 | 7 | 8 | 9 | Rank | Points |
|---|---|---|---|---|---|---|---|---|---|---|---|---|---|---|---|
| 2016 | Baxi DC Racing-Alpine | LMP2 | Alpine A460 | Nissan VK45DE 4.5 L V8 | SIL; 7 | SPA; Ret | LMS; Ret | NÜR; 7 | MEX; 5 | COA; 8 | FUJ; 9 | SHA; 8 | BHR; 6 | 13th | 40 |
| 2017 | Jackie Chan DC Racing | LMP2 | Oreca 07 | Gibson GK428 4.2 L V8 | SIL; 1 | SPA; 3 | LMS; 1 | **NÜR**; 1 | MEX; 9 | COA; 4 | FUJ; 3 | SHA; 4 | BHR; 2 | 2nd | 175 |
| 2018–19 | Jackie Chan DC Racing | LMP2 | Oreca 07 | Gibson GK428 4.2 L V8 | SPA; 1 | LMS; 4 | SIL; 1 | FUJ; 2 | **SHA**; 1 | **SEB**; 6 | **SPA**; 3 | LMS; 2 | | 2nd | 166 |
| 2019–20 | Jackie Chan DC Racing | LMP2 | Oreca 07 | Gibson GK428 4.2 L V8 | SIL; 4 | **FUJ**; 2 | SHA; 2 | BHR; 3 | COA; 2 | SPA; 6 | LMS; DSQ | BHR; 1 | | 5th | 136 |

Sporting positions
| Preceded by Inaugural | Formula BMW Asia; Champion; 2003 | Succeeded by Marchy Lee |
| Preceded by Peter Elkmann | German Formula Three Champion; 2006 | Succeeded by Carlo van Dam |
| Preceded by David Cheng | Asian Le Mans Series; LMP2 Champion; 2014; With: David Cheng | Succeeded by Nicolas Leutwiler |
| Preceded by Inaugural | Asian Le Mans Series; LMP3 Champion; 2015–16; With: David Cheng | Succeeded by Nigel Moore; Philip Hanson |
