= 2021 TCR Asia Series =

Car racing competition

The 2021 TCR Asia Series season was the sixth season of the TCR Asia Series, and first season of TCR Asia North Series, after the season of the previous year was canceled due to the coronavirus pandemic.

== Teams and drivers ==
Team	Car	No.	Drivers	Class		Rounds	Ref.
Team	Car	No.	Drivers	Series	Driver	Rounds	Ref.
(United Kingdom) HuffSport TM	Audi RS 3 LMS TCR	3	(China) Yang Xi	A C	Am	1–4	
(United Kingdom) HuffSport TM	Audi RS 3 LMS TCR	15	(China) Ken Tian	A C	Am	1–2	
(China) Team MG XPower	MG 6 X-Power TCR	7	(China) Yan Chuang	A C	Am	1–4	
(China) Team MG XPower	MG 6 X-Power TCR	18	(China) Zhendong Zhang	A C		All	
(China) Team MG XPower	MG 6 X-Power TCR	20	(Macau) Rodolfo Ávila	A C		All	
(China) Team MG XPower	MG 6 X-Power TCR	88	(China) Martin Cao	A C		All	
(China) Team MG XPower	MG 6 X-Power TCR	91	(China) Yao Li	A C		5–6	
(Macau) Elegant Racing Team	Volkswagen Golf GTI TCR	10	(China) Mai Yi Bo	A C	Am	2–4	
(China) 326 MMK Racing Team	Audi RS 3 LMS TCR	11	(China) Liu Zi Chen	A C	Am	All	
(China) 326 MMK Racing Team	Audi RS 3 LMS TCR	51	(China) Yifan Wu	A C	Am	All	
(China) 326 MMK Racing Team	Audi RS 3 LMS TCR	777	(China) Czheng Wan Cheng	A C		1	
(China) Shell Teamwork Lynk & Co Racing	Lynk & Co 03 TCR	12	(Hong Kong) Sunny Wong	A		All	
(China) Shell Teamwork Lynk & Co Racing	Lynk & Co 03 TCR	36	(China) Jason Zhang	A		All	
(China) Shell Teamwork Lynk & Co Racing	Lynk & Co 03 TCR	55	(China) Ma Qing Hua	A		All	
(China) ZZRT	Volkswagen Golf GTI TCR	16	(China) Ruan Cun Fan	A C	Am	1–4	
(China) Z.Speed	Audi RS 3 LMS TCR	17	(China) Yang Xiao Wei	A C	Am	1–4	
(China) Z.Speed	CUPRA León TCR	66	(China) Chen Ze Xun	A C	Am	1–2	
(China) Z.Speed	Volkswagen Golf GTI TCR	77	(China) Samuel Qiu	A C	Am	1–4	
(China) Z.Speed	Volkswagen Golf GTI TCR	87	(China) Li Chuan	A C	Am	5–6	
Guest entries
(China) SAIC Volkswagen 333 Team	Volkswagen Lamando CTCC	4	(China) Gao Hua Yang			3–6	
(China) SAIC Volkswagen 333 Team	Volkswagen Lamando CTCC	22	(China) Xiaole He			2–6	
(China) SAIC Volkswagen 333 Team	Volkswagen Lamando CTCC	26	(China) Sun Chao			2	
(China) SAIC Volkswagen 333 Team	Volkswagen Lamando CTCC	63	(China) Nathan Lu Wenhu			2, 5–6	
(China) SAIC Volkswagen 333 Team	Volkswagen Lamando CTCC	92	(China) Zhu Yuan Jie			2–4	
(China) SAIC Volkswagen 333 Team	Volkswagen Lamando CTCC	171	(China) Jiang Tengyi			3–6	

Key
A	TCR Asia
C	TCR China
Am	Am Cup

== Calendar and results ==
The revised calendar was announced on 30 April 2021.

Rnd.		Circuit	Date	Pole position	Fastest lap	Winning driver	Winning team	Am Cup winner	Supporting
1	1	Shanghai International Circuit	8–9 May	(China) Ma Qing Hua	(China) Ma Qing Hua	(China) Ma Qing Hua	(China) Shell Teamwork Lynk & Co Motorsport	(China) Yang Xiao Wei	TCR China; Porsche Carrera Cup Asia; GT Super Sprint Challenge
1	2	Shanghai International Circuit	8–9 May	No dispute	(China) Jason Zhang	(China) Ma Qing Hua	(China) Shell Teamwork Lynk & Co Motorsport	(China) Yang Xi	TCR China; Porsche Carrera Cup Asia; GT Super Sprint Challenge
2	3	Shanghai International Circuit	10–12 September	(China) Ma Qing Hua	(Macau) Rodolfo Ávila	(China) Ma Qing Hua	(China) Shell Teamwork Lynk & Co Motorsport	(China) Liu Zi Chen	TCR China; Porsche Carrera Cup Asia; GT Super Sprint Challenge
2	4	Shanghai International Circuit	10–12 September	No dispute	(China) Jason Zhang	(China) Jason Zhang	(China) Shell Teamwork Lynk & Co Motorsport	(China) Yang Xiao Wei	TCR China; Porsche Carrera Cup Asia; GT Super Sprint Challenge
3	5	Zhuzhou International Circuit	23 October	(China) Jason Zhang	(China) Jiang Tengyi	(China) Jason Zhang	(China) Shell Teamwork Lynk & Co Motorsport	(China) Wang Tao	TCR China; Porsche Carrera Cup Asia; GT Super Sprint Challenge
3	6	Zhuzhou International Circuit	23 October	No dispute	(China) Jiang Tengyi	(China) Martin Cao	(China) Team MG XPower	(China) Wang Tao	TCR China; Porsche Carrera Cup Asia; GT Super Sprint Challenge
4	7	Zhuzhou International Circuit	24 October	(China) Jiang Tengyi	(China) Jiang Tengyi	(China) Jiang Tengyi	(China) SAIC Volkswagen 333 Team	(China) Wang Tao	TCR China; Porsche Carrera Cup Asia; GT Super Sprint Challenge
4	8	Zhuzhou International Circuit	24 October	No dispute	(China) Jiang Tengyi	(China) Jason Zhang	(China) Shell Teamwork Lynk & Co Motorsport	(China) Wang Tao	TCR China; Porsche Carrera Cup Asia; GT Super Sprint Challenge
5	9	Shanghai Tianma Circuit	6 November						TCR China; Porsche Carrera Cup Asia; GT Super Sprint Challenge
5	10	Shanghai Tianma Circuit	6 November	No dispute					TCR China; Porsche Carrera Cup Asia; GT Super Sprint Challenge
6	11	Guia Circuit (Note: <The race held in Macau is part of the Macau Grand Prix event.>)	21 November						Porsche Carrera Cup Asia; GT Super Sprint Challenge
6	12	Guia Circuit	21 November	No dispute					Porsche Carrera Cup Asia; GT Super Sprint Challenge

== Championship standings ==
=== Drivers' championship ===
Scoring systems

1st	2nd	3rd	4th	5th	6th	7th	8th	9th	10th	PP	FL
25	18	15	12	10	8	6	4	2	1	**0**	0

Pos.	Driver	SHA1 (China)		SHA2 (China)		ZHZ1 (China)	ZHZ2 (China)	TIA (China)	MAC (Macau)	Pts.
1	(China) Ma Qing Hua	1^{1}	1	1	2					103
2	(China) Jason Zhang	2^{2}	2	7	1					71
3	(China) Yang Xiao Wei	5	10	3	5					36
4	(China) Yang Xi	6	3	9	9					28
5	(Macau) Rodolfo Ávila	Ret	5	10	4					27
6	(China) Liu ZiChen			2	6					26
7	(China) Zheng Wan Cheng	4	6							20
8	(Hong Kong) Sunny Wong	3^{3}	15							20
9	(China) Zhendong Zhang	Ret^{5}	4	8						20
10	(China) Martin Cao	Ret^{4}	DNS		3					17
11	(China) Ken Tian	8	9							14
12	(China) Yifan Wu	7	8							12
13	(China) YiBo Mai			4						12
14	(China) Ruan Cun Fan	Ret	Ret	5						10
15	(China) Wang Tao	12	10	6						8
16	(China) Yan Chuang	11	11		8					7
17	(China) Chen Ze Xun	10	14		10					3
18	(China) Samuel Qiu	12	13							0
Drivers ineligible to score points
-	(China) Qi Lin	Ret	7							-
Pos.	Driver	SHA1 (China)		SHA2 (China)		ZHZ1 (China)	ZHZ2 (China)	TIA (China)	MAC (Macau)	Pts.

Colour	Result
Gold	Winner
Silver	Second place
Bronze	Third place
Green	Points classification
Blue	Non-points classification
Blue	Non-classified finish (NC)
Purple	Retired, not classified (Ret)
Red	Did not qualify (DNQ)
Red	Did not pre-qualify (DNPQ)
Black	Disqualified (DSQ)
White	Did not start (DNS)
White	Withdrew (WD)
White	Race cancelled (C)
Blank	Did not practice (DNP)
Blank	Did not arrive (DNA)
Blank	Excluded (EX)

**Bold** – Pole
Italics – Fastest Lap
