= 2021 TCR China Touring Car Championship =

Touring championship

The 2021 TCR China season is the fifth season of the TCR's Chinese Touring Car Championship.

== Teams and drivers ==
| Team | Car | No. | Drivers | Class | Rounds | Ref. |
|---|---|---|---|---|---|---|
| (United Kingdom) HuffSport TM | Audi RS 3 LMS TCR | 3 | (China) Yang Xi | A Ch Am | 1–4 | |
| (United Kingdom) HuffSport TM | Audi RS 3 LMS TCR | 15 | (China) Ken Tian | A Ch Am | 1–2 | |
| (China) Team MG XPower | MG 6 X-Power TCR | 7 | (China) Yan Chuang | A Ch Am | 1–4 | |
| (China) Team MG XPower | MG 6 X-Power TCR | 18 | (China) Zhang Zhendong | A Ch | All | |
| (China) Team MG XPower | MG 6 X-Power TCR | 20 | (Macau) Rodolfo Ávila | A Ch | All | |
| (China) Team MG XPower | MG 6 X-Power TCR | 88 | (China) Martin Cao | A Ch | All | |
| (China) Team MG XPower | MG 6 X-Power TCR | 91 | (China) Yao Li | A Ch | 5–6 | |
| (Macau) Elegant Racing Team | Volkswagen Golf GTI TCR | 10 | (China) Mai Yi Bo | A Ch Am | 2–4 | |
| (Macau) Elegant Racing Team | Volkswagen Golf GTI TCR | 45 | (Czech Republic) Tom Beckhäuser | A Ch | | |
| (China) 326 MMK Racing Team | Audi RS 3 LMS TCR | 11 | (China) Liu Zi Chen | A Ch Am | All | |
| (China) 326 MMK Racing Team | Audi RS 3 LMS TCR | 51 | (China) Yifan Wu | A Ch Am | All | |
| (China) 326 MMK Racing Team | Audi RS 3 LMS TCR | 777 | (China) Zheng Wan Cheng | A Ch | 1 | |
| (China) ZZRT | Volkswagen Golf GTI TCR | 16 | (China) Ruan Cun Fan | A Ch Am | 1–4 | |
| (China) ZZRT | Volkswagen Golf GTI TCR | 21 | (China) He Zijian | A Ch | | |
| (China) Z.Speed | Audi RS 3 LMS TCR | 17 | (China) Yang Xiao Wei | A Ch Am | 1–4 | |
| (China) Z.Speed | CUPRA León TCR | 66 | (China) Chen Ze Xun | A Ch Am | 1–2 | |
| (China) Z.Speed | Volkswagen Golf GTI TCR | 77 | (China) Samuel Qiu | A Ch Am | 1–4 | |
| (China) Z.Speed | Volkswagen Golf GTI TCR | 87 | (China) Li Chuan | A Ch Am | 5–6 | |
| (China) AHRT Autohome Racing Team | MG 6 X-Power TCR | 71 | (China) Zhiyi Zhang | Ch Am | 3–4 | |
| (China) AHRT Autohome Racing Team | MG 6 X-Power TCR | 100 | (China) Qi Liang | Ch Am | 2, 5–6 | |
| (China) AHRT Autohome Racing Team | MG 6 X-Power TCR | 601 | (China) Wang Tao | Ch Am | All | |
| (China) AHRT Autohome Racing Team | MG 6 X-Power TCR | 818 | (China) Qi Lin | Ch Am | 1 | |
| (Hong Kong) BlackArts Racing Team | Alfa Romeo Giulietta | 998 | (France) Alexandre Bardinon | A Ch | X | |
| (Hong Kong) BlackArts Racing Team | Alfa Romeo Giulietta | 999 | (Hong Kong) Patrick Tsang | A Ch | X | |
Guest entries
| (China) SAIC Volkswagen 333 Team | Volkswagen Lamando CTCC | 4 | (China) Gao Hua Yang | Guest | 3–6 | |
| (China) SAIC Volkswagen 333 Team | Volkswagen Lamando CTCC | 22 | (China) Xiaole He | Guest | 2–6 | |
| (China) SAIC Volkswagen 333 Team | Volkswagen Lamando CTCC | 26 | (China) Sun Chao | Guest | 2 | |
| (China) SAIC Volkswagen 333 Team | Volkswagen Lamando CTCC | 63 | (China) Nathan Lu Wenhu | Guest | 2, 5–6 | |
| (China) SAIC Volkswagen 333 Team | Volkswagen Lamando CTCC | 92 | (China) Zhu Yuan Jie | Guest | 2–4 | |
| (China) SAIC Volkswagen 333 Team | Volkswagen Lamando CTCC | 171 | (China) Jiang Tengyi | Guest | 3–6 | |
| (China) Henmax Motorsport | Honda Civic Type R TCR | 5 | (China) Ma Qing Hua | Guest | X | |
| (China) Henmax Motorsport | Honda Civic Type R TCR | 33 | (China) Jason Zhang | Guest | X | |
| (China) Henmax Motorsport | Honda Civic Type R TCR | 50 | (Finland) Isac Blomqvist | Guest | X | |
| (China) Henmax Motorsport | Honda Civic Type R TCR | 55 | (China) Wang Zhongwei | Guest | X | |
| (Hong Kong) Grid Motorsport | Hyundai Elantra N TCR | 9 | (Hong Kong) Sunny Wong | Guest | X | |
| (Hong Kong) Grid Motorsport | Hyundai Elantra N TCR | 500 | (Chinese Taipei) Lishin Peng | Guest | X | |
| (Hong Kong) Grid Motorsport | Hyundai Elantra N TCR | 501 | (Chinese Taipei) Yuhon Peng | Guest | X | |

Key
| A | TCR Asia |
| Ch | TCR China |
| Am | Am Cup |

== Calendar and results ==
The revised calendar was announced on 30 April 2021.

| Rnd. | | Circuit | Date | Pole position | Fastest lap | Winning driver | Winning team | Am Cup winner | Supporting |
|---|---|---|---|---|---|---|---|---|---|
| 1 | 1 | Shanghai International Circuit | 9 May | (China) Cao Hong Wei | (China) Czheng Wan Cheng | (China) Yang Xi | (China) 326 MMK Racing Team | (China) Yang Xiao Wei | Porsche Carrera Cup Asia; GT Super Sprint Challenge |
| 1 | 2 | Shanghai International Circuit | 9 May | No Dispute | (China) Yang Xi | (China) Czheng Wan Cheng | (United Kingdom) HuffSport TM | (China) Yang Xi | Porsche Carrera Cup Asia; GT Super Sprint Challenge |
| 2 | 3 | Shanghai International Circuit | 11–12 September | (Macau) Rodolfo Ávila | (Macau) Rodolfo Ávila | (China) Liu Zi Chen | (China) 326 MMK Racing Team | (China) Liu Zi Chen | 2021 TCR Asia Series |
| 2 | 4 | Shanghai International Circuit | 11–12 September | No Dispute | (China) Zhang Zhendong | (China) Martin Cao | (China) Team MG XPower | (China) Yang Xiao Wei | 2021 TCR Asia Series |
| 3 | 5 | Zhuzhou International Circuit | 23 October | (China) Jiang Tengyi | (China) Jiang Tengyi | (China) Jiang Tengyi | (China) SAIC Volkswagen 333 Team | (China) Yang Xiao Wei | 2021 TCR Asia Series |
| 3 | 6 | Zhuzhou International Circuit | 23 October | No Dispute | (China) Jiang Tengyi | (China) Martin Cao | (China) Team MG XPower | (China) Yifan Wu | 2021 TCR Asia Series |
| 4 | 7 | Zhuzhou International Circuit | 24 October | (China) Jiang Tengyi | (China) Jiang Tengyi | (China) Jiang Tengyi | (China) SAIC Volkswagen 333 Team | (China) Yan Chuang | GT Super Sprint Challenge |
| 4 | 8 | Zhuzhou International Circuit | 24 October | No Dispute | (China) Jiang Tengyi | (China) Jiang Tengyi | (China) SAIC Volkswagen 333 Team | (China) Samuel Qiu | GT Super Sprint Challenge |
| 5 | 9 | Shanghai Tianma Circuit | 6 November | (China) Jiang Tengyi | (China) Martin Cao | (China) Zhang Zhendong | (China) Team MG XPower | (China) Yan Chuang | GT Super Sprint Challenge |
| 5 | 10 | Shanghai Tianma Circuit | 6 November | No Dispute | (China) Jiang Tengyi | (China) Zhang Zhendong | (China) Team MG XPower | (China) Li Chuan | GT Super Sprint Challenge |
| 6 | 11 | Shanghai Tianma Circuit | 7 November | (China) Jiang Tengyi | (China) Nathan Lu Wenhu | (China) Martin Cao | (China) Team MG XPower | (China) Yan Chuang | GT Super Sprint Challenge |
| 6 | 12 | Shanghai Tianma Circuit | 7 November | No Dispute | (China) Nathan Lu Wenhu | (Macau) Rodolfo Ávila | (China) Team MG XPower | (China) Yan Chuang | GT Super Sprint Challenge |

== Championship standings ==
=== Drivers' championship ===
Scoring systems

| 1st | 2nd | 3rd | 4th | 5th | 6th | 7th | 8th | 9th | 10th | PP | FL |
|---|---|---|---|---|---|---|---|---|---|---|---|
| 25 | 18 | 15 | 12 | 10 | 8 | 6 | 4 | 2 | 1 | **0** | 0 |

| Pos. | Driver | SHA1 (China) | | SHA2 (China) | | ZHZ1 (China) | | ZHZ2 (China) | | TIA1 (China) | | TIA2 (China) | | Pts. |
| Pos. | Driver | RD1 | RD2 | RD1 | RD2 | RD1 | RD2 | RD1 | RD2 | RD1 | RD2 | RD1 | RD2 | Pts. |
|---|---|---|---|---|---|---|---|---|---|---|---|---|---|---|
| 1 | (Macau) Rodolfo Ávila | Ret | 5 | 3 | 3 | 2 | 4 | 2 | 2 | 2 | 3 | 4 | 1 | 181 |
| 2 | (China) Martin Cao | Ret^{1} | DNS | 2 | 1 | Ret | 1 | 3 | 4 | 9 | 8 | 1 | 3 | 146 |
| 3 | (China) Zhang Zhendong | Ret^{2} | 4 | 14 | 5 | 4 | 5 | 4 | 5 | 1 | 1 | 14 | 9 | 128 |
| 4 | (China) Yifan Wu | 7 | 8 | 4 | 4 | Ret | 3 | 17 | 9 | 7 | Ret | 2 | 4 | 97 |
| 5 | (China) Yang Xi | 6 | 3 | 9 | 8 | 3 | 6 | 8 | 15 | | | | | 73 |
| 6 | (China) Wang Tao | 9^{4} | 10 | 10 | 12 | 5 | 7 | 7 | 8 | 8 | 9 | 3 | 6 | 70 |
| 7 | (China) Liu Zi Chen | Ret | Ret | 1 | 2 | 11 | 12 | 10 | 12 | 10 | 11 | 6 | 7 | 59 |
| 8 | (France) Alexandre Bardinon | | | | | | | | | 4 | 2 | Ret | 2 | 48 |
| 9 | (China) Zheng Wan Cheng | 4^{3} | 6 | | | | | | | | | | | 40 |
| 10 | (China) Samuel Qiu | 12 | 13 | 6 | 6 | DNS | 10 | Ret | 3 | | | | | 34 |
| 11 | (China) Yang Xiao Wei | 5 | 12 | 7 | 7 | 14 | Ret | 12 | 11 | | | | | 31 |
| 12 | (China) Yao Li | | | | | | | | | 5 | 6 | 5 | Ret | 28 |
| 13 | (Czech Republic) Tom Beckhäuser | | | | | 6 | 2 | | | 20 | 16 | Ret | Ret | 26 |
| 14 | (China) Yan Chuang | 11 | 11 | 11 | 10 | 13 | 15 | 5 | 6 | | | | | 25 |
| 15 | (China) Mai Yi Bo | | | 5 | 13 | 7 | 8 | 16 | Ret | | | | | 20 |
| 16 | (China) Qi Liang | | | | | 9 | 11 | 9 | 14 | 14 | 12 | 7 | 5 | 20 |
| 17 | (China) Ruan Cun Fan | Ret | Ret | 15 | NC | 8 | 9 | 6 | 7 | | | | | 18 |
| 18 | (China) Ken Tian | 8^{5} | 9 | 12 | 11 | | | | | | | | | 17 |
| 19 | (China) Li Chuan | | | | | | | | | 12 | 7 | 9 | 8 | 12 |
| 20 | (China) Chen Ze Xun | 10 | 14 | 8 | 9 | | | | | | | | | 12 |
| 21 | (China) Qi Lin | Ret | 7 | | | | | | | | | | | 10 |
| 22 | (China) Zhiyi Zhang | | | | | 10 | DSQ | 15 | 13 | | | | | 1 |
| 23 | (China) He Zijian | | | | | | | | | 13 | 14 | | | 0 |
| 24 | (Hong Kong) Patrick Tsang | | | | | | | | | 19 | 17 | 13 | 12 | 0 |
Drivers ineligible to score points
| - | (China) Jiang Tengyi | | | | | 1 | Wth | 1 | 1 | 3 | 5 | 8 | 10 | - |
| - | (China) Ma Qing Hua | 1 | 1 | | | | | | | | | | | - |
| - | (China) Jason Zhang | 2 | 2 | | | | | | | | | | | - |
| - | (Hong Kong) Sunny Wong | 3 | 15 | | | | | | | | | | | - |
| - | (China) Sun Chao | | | 15 | 15 | | | | | 6 | 4 | 12 | 14 | - |
| - | (China) Gao Huan Yang | | | 13 | 14 | Ret | DNS | 14 | 16 | 16 | 10 | 10 | 11 | - |
| - | (Chinese Taipei) Lishin Peng | | | | | | | | | 11 | 13 | 11 | NPQ | - |
| - | (China) Zhu Yuan Jie | | | 16 | Wth | 12 | 13 | Ret | Ret | | | | | - |
| - | (Chinese Taipei) Yuhon Peng | | | | | | | | | 17 | 18 | DNQ | 13 | - |
| - | (China) Nathan Lu Wenhu | | | Ret | DNS | INF | 14 | DNS | DNS | | | | | - |
| - | (Finland) Isac Blomqvist | | | 17 | Ret | | | | | 15 | Ret | | | - |
| - | (China) Wang Zhongwei | | | | | | | | | 18 | 15 | | | - |
| - | (China) Xiaole He | | | Ret | 16 | | | | | | | | | - |
| Pos. | Driver | SHA1 (China) | | SHA2 (China) | | ZHZ1 (China) | | ZHZ2 (China) | | TIA1 (China) | | TIA2 (China) | | Pts. |

| Colour | Result |
|---|---|
| Gold | Winner |
| Silver | Second place |
| Bronze | Third place |
| Green | Points classification |
| Blue | Non-points classification |
| Blue | Non-classified finish (NC) |
| Purple | Retired, not classified (Ret) |
| Red | Did not qualify (DNQ) |
| Red | Did not pre-qualify (DNPQ) |
| Black | Disqualified (DSQ) |
| White | Did not start (DNS) |
| White | Withdrew (WD) |
| White | Race cancelled (C) |
| Blank | Did not practice (DNP) |
| Blank | Did not arrive (DNA) |
| Blank | Excluded (EX) |

**Bold** – Pole
Italics – Fastest Lap

=== Teams' championship ===
| Pos. | Driver | | SHA1 (China) | | SHA2 (China) | | ZHZ1 (China) | | ZHZ2 (China) | | TIA1 (China) | | TIA2 (China) | | Pts. |
| Pos. | Driver | N° | RD1 | RD2 | RD1 | RD2 | RD1 | RD2 | RD1 | RD2 | RD1 | RD2 | RD1 | RD2 | Pts. |
|---|---|---|---|---|---|---|---|---|---|---|---|---|---|---|---|
| 1 | (China) Team MG XPower | 7 | 11 | 11 | 11 | 10 | 13 | 15 | 5 | 6 | | | | | 508 |
| 1 | (China) Team MG XPower | 18 | Ret^{2} | 4 | 14 | 5 | 4 | 5 | 4 | 5 | 1 | 1 | 14 | 9 | 508 |
| 1 | (China) Team MG XPower | 20 | Ret | 5 | 3 | 3 | 2 | 4 | 2 | 2 | 2 | 3 | 4 | 1 | 508 |
| 1 | (China) Team MG XPower | 88 | Ret^{1} | DNS | 2 | 1 | Ret | 1 | 3 | 4 | 9 | 8 | 1 | 3 | 508 |
| 1 | (China) Team MG XPower | 91 | | | | | | | | | 5 | 6 | 5 | Ret | 508 |
| 2 | (China) 326 MMK Racing Team | 11 | Ret | Ret | 1 | 2 | 11 | 12 | 10 | 12 | 10 | 11 | 6 | 7 | 196 |
| 2 | (China) 326 MMK Racing Team | 51 | 7 | 8 | 4 | 4 | Ret | 3 | 17 | 9 | 7 | Ret | 2 | 4 | 196 |
| 2 | (China) 326 MMK Racing Team | 777 | 4^{3} | 6 | | | | | | | | | | | 196 |
| 3 | (China) AHRT Autohome Racing Team | 71 | | | | | 10 | DSQ | 15 | 13 | | | | | 101 |
| 3 | (China) AHRT Autohome Racing Team | 100 | | | | | 9 | 11 | 9 | 14 | 14 | 12 | 7 | 5 | 101 |
| 3 | (China) AHRT Autohome Racing Team | 601 | 9^{4} | 10 | 10 | 12 | 5 | 7 | 7 | 8 | 8 | 9 | 3 | 6 | 101 |
| 3 | (China) AHRT Autohome Racing Team | 818 | Ret | 7 | | | | | | | | | | | 101 |
| 4 | (United Kingdom) HuffSport TM | 3 | 6 | 3 | 9 | 8 | 3 | 6 | 8 | 15 | | | | | 90 |
| 4 | (United Kingdom) HuffSport TM | 15 | 8^{5} | 9 | 12 | 11 | | | | | | | | | 90 |
| 5 | (China) Z.Speed | 17 | 5 | 12 | 7 | 7 | 14 | Ret | 12 | 11 | | | | | 89 |
| 5 | (China) Z.Speed | 66 | 10 | 14 | 8 | 9 | | | | | | | | | 89 |
| 5 | (China) Z.Speed | 77 | 12 | 13 | 6 | 6 | DNS | 10 | Ret | 3 | | | | | 89 |
| 5 | (China) Z.Speed | 87 | | | | | | | | | 12 | 7 | 9 | 8 | 89 |
| 6 | (Hong Kong) BlackArts Racing Team | 998 | | | | | | | | | 4 | 2 | Ret | 2 | 48 |
| 6 | (Hong Kong) BlackArts Racing Team | 999 | | | | | | | | | 19 | 17 | 13 | 12 | 48 |
| 7 | (Macau) Elegant Racing Team | 10 | | | 5 | 13 | 7 | 8 | 16 | Ret | | | | | 46 |
| 7 | (Macau) Elegant Racing Team | 45 | | | | | 6 | 2 | | | 20 | 16 | Ret | Ret | 46 |
| 8 | (China) ZZRT | 16 | Ret | Ret | 15 | NC | 8 | 9 | 6 | 7 | | | | | 18 |
| 8 | (China) ZZRT | 21 | | | | | | | | | 13 | 14 | | | 18 |
Drivers ineligible to score points
| - | (China) SAIC Volkswagen 333 Team | 4 | | | 13 | 14 | Ret | DNS | 14 | 16 | 16 | 10 | 10 | 11 | - |
| - | (China) SAIC Volkswagen 333 Team | 22 | | | Ret | 16 | | | | | | | | | - |
| - | (China) SAIC Volkswagen 333 Team | 26 | | | 15 | 15 | | | | | 6 | 4 | 12 | 14 | - |
| - | (China) SAIC Volkswagen 333 Team | 63 | | | Ret | DNS | INF | 14 | DNS | DNS | | | | | - |
| - | (China) SAIC Volkswagen 333 Team | 92 | | | 16 | Wth | 12 | 13 | Ret | Ret | | | | | - |
| - | (China) SAIC Volkswagen 333 Team | 171 | | | | | 1 | Wth | 1 | 1 | 3 | 5 | 8 | 10 | - |
| - | (China) Henmax Motorsport | 5 | 1 | 1 | | | | | | | | | | | - |
| - | (China) Henmax Motorsport | 33 | 2 | 2 | | | | | | | | | | | - |
| - | (China) Henmax Motorsport | 50 | | | 17 | Ret | | | | | 15 | Ret | | | - |
| - | (China) Henmax Motorsport | 55 | | | | | | | | | 18 | 15 | | | - |
| - | (Hong Kong) Grid Motorsport | 9 | 3 | 15 | | | | | | | | | | | - |
| - | (Hong Kong) Grid Motorsport | 500 | | | | | | | | | 11 | 13 | 11 | NPQ | - |
| - | (Hong Kong) Grid Motorsport | 501 | | | | | | | | | 17 | 18 | DNQ | 13 | - |
| Pos. | Driver | | SHA1 (China) | | SHA2 (China) | | ZHZ1 (China) | | ZHZ2 (China) | | TIA1 (China) | | TIA2 (China) | | Pts. |

=== Am Cup ===
| Pos. | Driver | SHA1 (China) | | SHA2 (China) | | ZHZ1 (China) | | ZHZ2 (China) | | TIA1 (China) | | TIA2 (China) | | Pts. |
| Pos. | Driver | RD1 | RD2 | RD1 | RD2 | RD1 | RD2 | RD1 | RD2 | RD1 | RD2 | RD1 | RD2 | Pts. |
|---|---|---|---|---|---|---|---|---|---|---|---|---|---|---|
| 1 | (China) Yang Xi | 6 | 3 | 9 | 8 | 3 | 6 | 8 | 15 | | | | | |
| 2 | (China) Ken Tian | 8 | 9 | 12 | 11 | | | | | | | | | |
| 3 | (China) Yan Chuang | 11 | 11 | 11 | 10 | 13 | 15 | 5 | 6 | | | | | |
| 4 | (China) Mai Yi Bo | | | 5 | 13 | 7 | 8 | 16 | Ret | | | | | |
| 5 | (China) Liu Zi Chen | | | 1 | 2 | 11 | 12 | 10 | 12 | 10 | 11 | 6 | 7 | |
| 6 | (China) Yifan Wu | 7 | 8 | 4 | 4 | Ret | 3 | 17 | 9 | 7 | Ret | 2 | 4 | |
| 7 | (China) Ruan Cun Fan | Ret | Ret | 15 | NC | 8 | 9 | 6 | 7 | | | | | |
| 8 | (China) Yang Xiao Wei | 5 | 12 | 7 | 7 | 14 | Ret | 12 | 11 | | | | | |
| 9 | (China) Chen Ze Xun | 10 | 14 | 8 | 9 | | | | | | | | | |
| 10 | (China) Samuel Qiu | 12 | 13 | 6 | 6 | DNS | 10 | Ret | 3 | | | | | |
| 11 | (China) Li Chuan | | | | | | | | | 12 | 7 | 9 | 8 | |
| 12 | (China) Zhiyi Zhang | | | | | 10 | DSQ | 15 | 13 | | | | | |
| 13 | (China) Qi Liang | | | | | 9 | 11 | 9 | 14 | 14 | 12 | 7 | 5 | |
| 14 | (China) Wang Tao | 9 | 10 | 10 | 12 | 5 | 7 | 7 | 8 | 8 | 9 | 3 | 6 | |
| | (China) Qi Lin | Ret | 7 | | | | | | | | | | | |
| Pos. | Driver | SHA1 (China) | | SHA2 (China) | | ZHZ1 (China) | | ZHZ2 (China) | | TIA1 (China) | | TIA2 (China) | | Pts. |
