= 2003 Formula BMW Asia season =

Seasons
- ← none 2004 →

The 2003 Formula BMW Asia season was held in 2003. It was won by the Meritus team, with Ho-Pin Tung. Tung claimed twelve pole positions and ten wins in 14 races during the course of the season, which spanned five countries.

Tung's reward was a test drive with the then BMW powered Williams F1 Team at the 4.428 kilometer (2.7 mile) Circuito de Jerez.

== Teams and drivers ==
All cars were Mygale FB02 chassis powered by BMW engines.

| Team | No | Driver | Class | Rounds |
|---|---|---|---|---|
| (Malaysia) Goddard-QHR | 2 | (Philippines) Dado Pena | R | All |
| (Malaysia) Goddard-QHR | 3 | (Philippines) Tyson Sy | R | All |
| Team India Racing | 6 | (India) Ajith Kumar | | All |
| Team India Racing | 83 | (India) Rajvirdhan Vijayakumar | R | All |
| (Malaysia) Team Meritus | 7 | (Malaysia) Ferhan Fauzy | | 3 |
| (Malaysia) Team Meritus | 8 | (Malaysia) Chin Tzer Jinn | R | All |
| (Malaysia) Team Meritus | 28 | (Malaysia) James Veerapan | R | 1 |
| (Malaysia) Team Meritus | 38 | (Hong Kong) Marchy Lee | | 7 |
| (Malaysia) Team Meritus | 58 | (China) Ho-Pin Tung | | All |
| (Malaysia) Team Meritus | 78 | (Hong Kong) Jim Ka To | | 4 |
| (Malaysia) Team Meritus | 88 | (Chinese Taipei) Hanss Lin Po Heng | | All |
| (South Korea) Team E-Rain | 9 | (South Korea) Lee Dooyoung | | All |
| (Thailand) 3 Crowns Racing | 11 | (Thailand) Nattapong Horthongkum | | All |
| (Thailand) 3 Crowns Racing | 16 | (China) Gary Sham | | All |
| Team Yellow Hat | 14 | (Japan) Keiko Ihara | | All |
| (Philippines) Team T.E.C Pilipinas | 18 | (Philippines) Don Pastor | R | All |
| (Thailand) Autosport Racing | 27 | (Japan) Tohru Jitsukawa | | All |
| Team Forty-One | 41 | (Japan) Ryo Nakano | R | All |
| (Japan) Autobacs with Racing On | 55 | (Japan) Akiko Kobayashi | | All |
| (South Korea) BMW Korea E-Rain | 61 | (South Korea) You Kyongouk | R | All |

| Icon | Class |
|---|---|
| R | Rookie Cup |
| G | Guest drivers ineligible to score points |

== Races ==
| Round | | Circuit | Date | Pole position | Fastest lap | Winning driver | Winning team | Winning rookie |
|---|---|---|---|---|---|---|---|---|
| 1 | R1 | (Malaysia) Sepang International Circuit | 22 March | (China) Ho-Pin Tung | (China) Ho-Pin Tung | (China) Ho-Pin Tung | (Malaysia) Team Meritus | (South Korea) You Kyongouk |
| 1 | R2 | (Malaysia) Sepang International Circuit | 23 March | (China) Ho-Pin Tung | (China) Ho-Pin Tung | (China) Ho-Pin Tung | (Malaysia) Team Meritus | (Malaysia) James Veerapan |
| 2 | R1 | (Malaysia) Sepang International Circuit | 7 June | (China) Ho-Pin Tung | | (China) Ho-Pin Tung | (Malaysia) Team Meritus | |
| 2 | R2 | (Malaysia) Sepang International Circuit | 8 June | (China) Ho-Pin Tung | | (Chinese Taipei) Hanss Lin Po Heng | (Malaysia) Team Meritus | |
| 3 | R1 | (Malaysia) Johor Circuit | 28 June | (China) Ho-Pin Tung | no data | (Chinese Taipei) Hanss Lin Po Heng | (Malaysia) Team Meritus | (South Korea) You Kyongouk |
| 3 | R2 | (Malaysia) Johor Circuit | 29 June | (China) Ho-Pin Tung | no data | (China) Ho-Pin Tung | (Malaysia) Team Meritus | (South Korea) You Kyongouk |
| 4 | R1 | (Thailand) Bira Circuit | 20 July | (China) Ho-Pin Tung | no data | (China) Ho-Pin Tung | (Malaysia) Team Meritus | (Philippines) Tyson Sy |
| 4 | R2 | (Thailand) Bira Circuit | 20 July | (China) Ho-Pin Tung | no data | (China) Ho-Pin Tung | (Malaysia) Team Meritus | (Philippines) Don Pastor |
| 5 | R1 | (South Korea) Taebaek Racing Park | 24 August | (China) Ho-Pin Tung | no data | (China) Ho-Pin Tung | (Malaysia) Team Meritus | (Philippines) Tyson Sy |
| 5 | R2 | (South Korea) Taebaek Racing Park | 24 August | (China) Ho-Pin Tung | no data | (China) Ho-Pin Tung | (Malaysia) Team Meritus | (South Korea) You Kyongouk |
| 6 | R1 | (Japan) Autopolis | 28 September | (China) Ho-Pin Tung | no data | (China) Ho-Pin Tung | (Malaysia) Team Meritus | (South Korea) You Kyongouk |
| 6 | R2 | (Japan) Autopolis | 28 September | (China) Ho-Pin Tung | | (China) Ho-Pin Tung | (Malaysia) Team Meritus | |
| 7 | R1 | (China) Goldenport Park Circuit | 26 October | (Hong Kong) Marchy Lee | no data | (Hong Kong) Marchy Lee | (Malaysia) Team Meritus | (Japan) Ryo Nakano |
| 7 | R2 | (China) Goldenport Park Circuit | 26 October | (Chinese Taipei) Hanss Lin Po Heng | no data | (Chinese Taipei) Hanss Lin Po Heng | (Malaysia) Team Meritus | (Philippines) Don Pastor |

== Standings ==
Points were awarded as follows:

| Position | **1st** | **2nd** | **3rd** | **4th** | **5th** | **6th** | **7th** | **8th** | **9th** | **10th** |
| Points | 20 | 15 | 12 | 10 | 8 | 6 | 4 | 3 | 2 | 1 |

=== Drivers' Championship ===
| Pos | Driver | SEP1 (Malaysia) | | SEP2 (Malaysia) | | JOH (Malaysia) | | BIR (Thailand) | | TAE (South Korea) | | AUT (Japan) | | BEI (China) | | Pts | Final Pts |
|---|---|---|---|---|---|---|---|---|---|---|---|---|---|---|---|---|---|
| 1 | (China) Ho-Pin Tung | **1** | **1** | **1** | Ret | **2** | **1** | **1** | **1** | **1** | **1** | **1** | **1** | 4 | Ret | 205 | 225 |
| 2 | (Chinese Taipei) Hanss Lin Po Heng | 3 | Ret | 2 | 1 | 1 | 2 | 3 | 5 | 2 | 3 | 2 | 4 | 2 | **1** | 154 | 189 |
| 3 | (Japan) Keiko Ihara | 6 | 2 | ?? | ?? | 3 | 3 | 16 | 8 | 3 | 5 | 3 | 5 | 5 | 5 | 112 | 139 |
| 4 | (Thailand) Nattapong Horthongkum | 2 | 3 | ?? | ?? | 6 | 5 | 15 | 3 | 11 | 11 | 6 | ?? | 3 | 6 | 77 | 101 |
| 5 | (South Korea) You Kyongouk | 4 | Ret | ?? | ?? | 4 | 6 | 10 | ?? | 5 | 2 | 4 | ?? | 7 | 7 | 68 | 89 |
| 6 | (Philippines) Tyson Sy | 11 | 7 | ?? | ?? | 7 | Ret | 4 | ?? | 4 | 4 | 7 | ?? | Ret | 4 | 52 | 74 |
| 7 | (Japan) Tohru Jitsukawa | 7 | 5 | ?? | ?? | 5 | 4 | 6 | 7 | Ret | 8 | 8 | ?? | Ret | 10 | 47 | 66 |
| 8 | (Philippines) Don Pastor | 5 | 6 | ?? | ?? | 13 | Ret | 5 | 4 | 10 | 7 | Ret | ?? | Ret | 3 | 49 | 60 |
| 9 | (Hong Kong) Marchy Lee | | | | | | | | | | | | | **1** | 2 | 35 | 35 |
| 10 | (India) Rajvirdhan Vijayakumar | Ret | 8 | ?? | ?? | 8 | 7 | 7 | 14 | 8 | 9 | 5 | ?? | 9 | Ret | 29 | 34 |
| 11 | (Hong Kong) Jim Ka To | | | | | | | 2 | 2 | | | | | | | 30 | 30 |
| 12 | (India) Ajith Kumar | Ret | 10 | ?? | ?? | 9 | 8 | 8 | 6 | Ret | 6 | Ret | ?? | Ret | 8 | 24 | 29 |
| 13 | (Japan) Akiko Kobayashi | 9 | Ret | ?? | ?? | 11 | 13 | 9 | ?? | 6 | Ret | Ret | ?? | 8 | Ret | 13 | 19 |
| 14 | (Japan) Ryo Nakano | Ret | Ret | ?? | ?? | 14 | Ret | 12 | ?? | 7 | 10 | 9 | ?? | 6 | Ret | 13 | 16 |
| 15 | (Malaysia) James Veerapan | Ret | 4 | | | | | | | | | | | | | 10 | 10 |
| 16 | (Philippines) Dado Pena | 8 | 11 | ?? | ?? | 15 | 9 | DNS | ?? | 9 | 14 | Ret | ?? | Ret | DNS | 7 | 7 |
| 17 | (South Korea) Lee Dooyoung | 12 | 9 | ?? | ?? | 16 | 14 | 13 | ?? | 12 | 12 | 11 | ?? | 10 | 9 | 5 | 5 |
| 18 | (China) Gary Sham | 10 | Ret | ?? | ?? | 10 | 10 | 11 | ?? | 13 | DNS | 12 | ?? | Ret | Ret | 3 | 5 |
| 19 | (Malaysia) Chin Tzer Jinn | Ret | Ret | ?? | ?? | 12 | 11 | 14 | ?? | 14 | 13 | 10 | ?? | 11 | 11 | 1 | 1 |
| 20 | (Malaysia) Ferhan Fauzy | | | | | 17 | 12 | | | | | | | | | 0 | 0 |
| Pos | Driver | SEP1 (Malaysia) | | SEP2 (Malaysia) | | JOH (Malaysia) | | BIR (Thailand) | | TAE (South Korea) | | AUT (Japan) | | BEI (China) | | Pts | Final Pts |

| Colour | Result |
|---|---|
| Gold | Winner |
| Silver | Second place |
| Bronze | Third place |
| Green | Points classification |
| Blue | Non-points classification |
| Blue | Non-classified finish (NC) |
| Purple | Retired, not classified (Ret) |
| Red | Did not qualify (DNQ) |
| Red | Did not pre-qualify (DNPQ) |
| Black | Disqualified (DSQ) |
| White | Did not start (DNS) |
| White | Withdrew (WD) |
| White | Race cancelled (C) |
| Blank | Did not practice (DNP) |
| Blank | Did not arrive (DNA) |
| Blank | Excluded (EX) |

**Bold** – Pole
Italics – Fastest Lap

=== Rookie Cup ===
| Pos | Driver | SEP1 (Malaysia) | | SEP2 (Malaysia) | | JOH (Malaysia) | | BIR (Thailand) | | TAE (South Korea) | | AUT (Japan) | | BEI (China) | | Pts | Final Pts |
|---|---|---|---|---|---|---|---|---|---|---|---|---|---|---|---|---|---|
| 1 | (South Korea) You Kyongouk | 1 | Ret | ?? | ?? | 1 | 1 | 4 | ?? | 2 | 1 | 1 | ?? | 2 | 3 | 152 | 205 |
| 2 | (Philippines) Tyson Sy | 4 | 3 | ?? | ?? | 2 | Ret | 1 | ?? | 1 | 2 | 3 | ?? | Ret | 2 | 119 | 169 |
| 3 | (Philippines) Don Pastor | 2 | 2 | ?? | ?? | 5 | Ret | 2 | 1 | 6 | 3 | Ret | ?? | Ret | 1 | 111 | 151 |
| 4 | (India) Rajvirdhan Vijayakumar | Ret | 4 | ?? | ?? | 3 | 2 | 3 | ?? | 4 | 4 | 2 | ?? | 3 | Ret | 96 | 134 |
| 5 | (Japan) Ryo Nakano | Ret | Ret | ?? | ?? | 6 | Ret | 5 | ?? | 3 | 5 | 4 | ?? | 1 | Ret | 64 | 105 |
| 6 | (Malaysia) Chin Tzer Jinn | Ret | Ret | ?? | ?? | 4 | 4 | 6 | ?? | 7 | 6 | 5 | ?? | 4 | 4 | 64 | 88 |
| 7 | (Philippines) Dado Pena | 3 | 5 | ?? | ?? | 7 | 3 | DNS | ?? | 5 | 7 | Ret | ?? | Ret | DNS | 48 | 78 |
| 8 | (Malaysia) James Veerapan | Ret | 1 | | | | | | | | | | | | | 20 | 20 |
