= Circuit du Mas du Clos =

Racing circuit in Mas du Clos, Saint-Avit-de-Tardes, France

- Original full circuit (1967–2010)
- Location: Mas du Clos, Saint-Avit-de-Tardes, France
- Coordinates: 45°56′9.6″N 2°18′7″E
- Owner: Alexandre Bardinon
- Operator: Alexandre Bardinon
- Opened: 1963; Reopened: October 2022; 3 years ago
- Closed: 2010

Full circuit (2022–present)
- Surface: Asphalt
- Length: 3.07 km (1.91 mi)
- Turns: 12

Short circuit (1967–2010, 2022–present)
- Length: 2.286 km (1.420 mi)
- Turns: 6

Original full circuit (1967–2010)
- Length: 3.072 km (1.909 mi)
- Turns: 12

Circuit du Mas du Clos is a 3.1 km (1.9 mi) racing circuit located at Mas du Clos, near Saint-Avit-de-Tardes, in central France. The circuit was founded in 1963 by Pierre Bardinon, one of the most prominent Ferrari collectors in the world.

Originally built for private use, the circuit was designed as a testing and driving facility for Bardinon’s personal collection of road and racing cars. Unlike most racing circuits of its era, the Mas du Clos was not created to host major competitions, but rather to follow the natural topography of the land, resulting in a highly technical and undulating layout.

Following Pierre Bardinon’s death, ownership of the circuit passed to his son, Patrick Bardinon, who later opened the track to private events, track days, and club activities. The circuit is currently owned and operated by racing driver Alexandre Bardinon, grandson of the founder.

In addition to its use as a racing circuit, the site became the base of the modern and historic racing team Mas du Clos Racing (MCR) from 2010 onwards.

The château located adjacent to the circuit was also owned by Pierre Bardinon. It is now owned by Patrick Bardinon and houses a private collection of Ferrari road and racing cars, regarded as one of the most significant Ferrari collections in the world.

After more than a decade of closure due to safety and infrastructure requirements, the circuit was fully renovated and officially reopened in October 2022.
