= 2021 Porsche Carrera Cup Asia =

Motorsport racing season

The 2021 Porsche Carrera Cup Asia was the eighteenth season of the Porsche Carrera Cup Asia. The season commenced on May 7 at the Shanghai International Circuit and finished at the same circuit on October 31.

After the cancellation of the 2020 season owing to the COVID-19 pandemic, 2021 saw the championship take place entirely within China with no international stops on the calendar. Entrants were restricted to teams based in China, or the territories of Hong Kong and Macau. This season also saw the introduction of the Am class championship.

In a closely-contested championship, Daniel Lu Wenlong ultimately emerged victorious to become the champion in his third year in the category. Bao Jinlong successfully the Pro-Am championship for the second time in succession, Eric Kwong became the first Am class champion in the categories history and Team Jebsen claimed the Dealer Trophy for the first time.

== Calendar ==
The provisional calendar was released on January 9 However, after multiple key events were cancelled as a result of the effects of the global pandemic, the schedule was reorganized and the championship took place exclusively within China.

Round	Circuit	Date	Supporting
1	Shanghai International Circuit, Shanghai, China	7–9 May	TCR Asia Series; TCR China Touring Car Championship
2	Zhuhai International Circuit, Guangdong, China	21–23 May	Stand-alone event
C	~~Suzuka Circuit, Mie, Japan~~	~~20–21 August~~	~~Intercontinental GT Challenge~~; ~~Lamborghini Super Trofeo Asia~~
3	Ningbo International Circuit, Zhejiang, China	3–5 September	China Endurance Championship
4	Ningbo International Circuit, Zhejiang, China	17–19 September	China Endurance Championship
C	~~Marina Bay Street Circuit, Marina Bay, Singapore~~	~~1–3 October~~	~~Singapore Grand Prix~~; ~~Ferrari Challenge Asia-Pacific~~
5	Zhuzhou International Circuit, Hunan, China	22–24 October	TCR Asia Series; TCR China Touring Car Championship
6	Shanghai International Circuit, Shanghai, China	29–31 October	Stand-alone event
NC	~~Guia Circuit, Macau~~	~~19–21 November~~	~~Macau Grand Prix~~; ~~TCR Asia Series~~

=== Cancelled events ===
- The Suzuka event scheduled for August was to be run as part of the 2021 Intercontinental GT Challenge Suzuka 10 Hours support package. However, in March, the event was cancelled owing to travel restrictions brought on by the coronavirus pandemic.
- The Singapore round was to be run as part of the Singapore Grand Prix support package. Like with the Suzuka round, the event would be cancelled in June owing to the effects of the pandemic.
- A non-championship invitational event in Macau was scheduled after the conclusion of the championship in November. However, no such racing took place that weekend.

== Teams and drivers ==
All entrants utilized the new Porsche 911 GT3 Cup (Type 992); replacing the outgoing Porsche 911 GT3 Cup (Type 991 II).

Team	No.	Driver	Class	Rounds
(Hong Kong) Absolute Racing	3	(China) Bian Ye	PA	All
(China) Team Shanghai Yonda	6	(China) Bao Jinlong	PA	All
(China) TORO Racing	7	(Macau) André Couto	P	1–2
(China) TORO Racing	7	(Italy) Massimiliano Wiser	P	3–6
(China) TORO Racing	66	(China) Min Heng	PA	All
(China) Porsche Beijing Central & Goldenport	9	(China) Li Chao	PA	All
(China) Meidong Racing	12	(China) Ling Kang	P	All
(China) Meidong Racing	68	(China) Zhou Bihuang	PA	All
(Hong Kong) Team Jebsen	20	(China) Daniel Lu Wenlong	P	All
(China) BD Group	22	(China) Ye Hongli	P	All
(Hong Kong) KiddyWorld Racing	23	(Hong Kong) Eric Kwong	Am	All
(China) ZZRT Competizione	55	(China) Wu Jiaxin	Am	3–4, 6
(China) Team Shanghai Pudong & Waigaoqiao	69	(Chinese Taipei) Jacky Wu	Am	1, 3–4
(China) Team Shanghai Pudong & Waigaoqiao	69	(Hong Kong) Jeffrey Zee	Am	2, 5–6
(Germany) Team Porsche Holding	86	(China) Cui Yue	P	All
(China) Ivory Bay Capital	88	(China) Yuan Bo	P	All
(Hong Kong) Triple Ace Racing	91	(Hong Kong) Henry Kwong	Am	All
(Singapore) Team StarChase	99	(China) Yu Kuai	P	All
(China) Horsepower	666	(China) Lin Yue	PA	1–3
(China) Silver Rocket	828	(China) Lia Jia	Am	All
(China) 20XX Racing	911	(China) Nathan Lu Wenhu	P	All

Icon	Class
P	Pro Cup
PA	Pro-Am Cup
Am	Am Cup
	Guest Starter

== Results ==
Round		Circuit	Pole Position	Fastest Lap	Winning Driver	Winning Team	Pro-Am Winner	Am Winner
1	R1	(China) Shanghai 1	(China) Daniel Lu Wenlong	(China) Ling Kang	(China) Ling Kang	(China) Meidong Racing	(China) Zhou Bihuang	(Hong Kong) Eric Kwong
1	R2	(China) Shanghai 1	(China) Yu Kuai	(China) Ye Hongli	(China) Ye Hongli	(China) BD Group	(China) Bao Jinlong	(Hong Kong) Henry Kwong
2	R1	(China) Zhuhai	(China) Yu Kuai	(China) Ye Hongli	(China) Cui Yue	(Germany) Team Porsche Holding	(China) Bian Ye	(Hong Kong) Eric Kwong
2	R2	(China) Zhuhai	(China) Cui Yue	(China) Ling Kang	(China) Cui Yue	(Germany) Team Porsche Holding	(China) Bao Jinlong	(Hong Kong) Eric Kwong
3	R1	(China) Ningbo 1	(China) Ye Hongli	(China) Daniel Lu Wenlong	(China) Daniel Lu Wenlong	(Hong Kong) Team Jebsen	(China) Bao Jinlong	(Hong Kong) Eric Kwong
3	R2	(China) Ningbo 1	(China) Ye Hongli	(China) Ling Kang	(China) Ye Hongli	(China) BD Group	(China) Bao Jinlong	(Hong Kong) Eric Kwong
3	R3	(China) Ningbo 1	(China) Daniel Lu Wenlong	(China) Daniel Lu Wenlong	(China) Daniel Lu Wenlong	(Hong Kong) Team Jebsen	(China) Bao Jinlong	(Hong Kong) Henry Kwong
4	R1	(China) Ningbo 2	(China) Ling Kang	(China) Daniel Lu Wenlong	(China) Daniel Lu Wenlong	(Hong Kong) Team Jebsen	(China) Bao Jinlong	(Hong Kong) Henry Kwong
4	R2	(China) Ningbo 2	(China) Yu Kuai	(China) Ling Kang	(China) Yu Kuai	(Singapore) Team StarChase	(China) Zhou Bihuang	(Hong Kong) Eric Kwong
5	R1	(China) Zhuzhou	(China) Yu Kuai	(China) Ling Kang	(China) Yu Kuai	(Singapore) Team StarChase	(China) Bao Jinlong	(Hong Kong) Henry Kwong
5	R2	(China) Zhuzhou	(China) Yu Kuai	(China) Ye Hongli	(China) Cui Yue	(Germany) Team Porsche Holding	(China) Bao Jinlong	(Hong Kong) Henry Kwong
5	R3	(China) Zhuzhou	(China) Yu Kuai	(China) Yu Kuai	(China) Yu Kuai	(Singapore) Team StarChase	(China) Zhou Bihuang	(Hong Kong) Eric Kwong
6	R1	(China) Shanghai 2	(China) Ye Hongli	(China) Ye Hongli	(China) Ye Hongli	(China) BD Group	(China) Min Heng	(Hong Kong) Eric Kwong
6	R2	(China) Shanghai 2	(China) Ye Hongli	(China) Cui Yue	(China) Ye Hongli	(China) BD Group	(China) Bao Jinlong	(Hong Kong) Henry Kwong
6	R3	(China) Shanghai 2	(China) Ye Hongli	(China) Daniel Lu Wenlong	(China) Daniel Lu Wenlong	(Hong Kong) Team Jebsen	(China) Min Heng	(Hong Kong) Henry Kwong

== Championship standings ==
=== Scoring system ===
Points were awarded to the top fifteen classified drivers in every race, using the following system:

Position	1st	2nd	3rd	4th	5th	6th	7th	8th	9th	10th	11th	12th	13th	14th	15th	Pole	FL
Points	25	20	17	14	12	10	9	8	7	6	5	4	3	2	1	1	1

=== Overall ===
Pos.	Driver	SHA1 (China)		ZHU (China)		NIN1 (China)			NIN2 (China)		ZHO (China)			SHA2 (China)			Points
Pos.	Driver	R1	R2	R3	R4	R5	R6	R7	R8	R9	R10	R11	R12	R13	R14	R15	Points
1	(China) Daniel Lu Wenlong	4	3	2	6	1	2	1	1	5	2	2	4	2	5	1	284
2	(China) Cui Yue	2	4	1	1	3	3	3	2	4	4	1	5	3	2	2	278
3	(China) Yu Kuai	5	2	3	4	DNS	5	4	3	1	1	5	1	4	3	4	255
4	(China) Ye Hongli	3	1	4	2	Ret	1	Ret	4	3	3	4	2	1	1	DSQ	239
5	(China) Ling Kang	1	5	DSQ	3	2	4	2	7	2	5	3	3	5	4	Ret	214
6	(Italy) Massimiliano Wiser					4	6	5	5	7	6	7	6	6	6	3	121
7	(China) Yuan Bo	6	6	5	5	Ret	8	6	6	6	Ret	13	9	12	7	5	117
8	(China) Bao Jinlong	Ret	7	7	7	5	7	8	8	9	7	8	11	9	8	7	115
9	(China) Min Heng	8	9	11	15	7	9	11	10	10	10	10	8	8	12	6	95
10	(China) Zhou Bihuang	7	13	Ret	8	9	10	9	9	8	9	9	7	11	13	8	93
11	(China) Bian Ye	10	11	6	9	12	13	10	15	11	11	12	10	10	9	9	81
12	(China) Nathan Lu Wenhu	9	12	Ret	DNS	6	12	7	Ret	12	8	6	Ret	7	11	15	70
13	(Hong Kong) Eric Kwong	11	16	9	10	8	11	14	12	14	15	DNS	12	14	15	12	51
14	(China) Li Chao	14	10	Ret	11	11	16	Ret	16	13	12	Ret	Ret	13	10	10	39
15	(Hong Kong) Henry Kwong	16	14	10	Ret	15	15	13	11	15	13	11	13	15	14	11	37
16	(China) Lin Yue	15	DNS	8	14	10	14	12									22
17	(China) Li Jia	17	17	12	12	14	17	15	13	17	14	15	14	17	18	13	20
18	(Macau) André Couto	13	8	Ret	DNS												12
19	(Hong Kong) Jeffrey Zee			13	13						16	14	15	18	17	14	11
20	(Chinese Taipei) Jacky Wu	12	15			13	DNS	17	Ret	16							5
21	(China) Wu Jiaxin					DNS	18	16	14	18				16	16	Ret	4
Pos.	Driver	R1	R2	R3	R4	R5	R6	R7	R8	R9	R10	R11	R12	R13	R14	R15	Points
Pos.	Driver	SHA1 (China)		ZHU (China)		NIN1 (China)			NIN2 (China)		ZHO (China)			SHA2 (China)			Points

== See also ==
- 2021 Porsche Supercup
- 2021 Porsche Carrera Cup Australia
- 2021 Porsche Carrera Cup Great Britain
