= Zongshen =

Automobile manufacturer

- Trade name: Chongqing Zongshen Power Machinery Company
- Native name: 宗申
- Traded as: SZSE: 001696
- Industry: Transportation
- Founded: 1992; 34 years ago
- Founder: Zuo Zongshen
- Headquarters: Chongqing, China
- Products: Motorcycles, scooters, quads
- Production output: 1,000,000+ motorcycles annually (claimed)
- Number of employees: 18,000
- Divisions: Zonsen; Cyclone; Cineco
- Subsidiaries: Zongshen Automobile Industry Manufacturing Co., Ltd. Chongqing Zongshen Tianchen General Aviation Investment and Development Co., Ltd; Chengdu Zong Shen Thermal Impetus Machinery Co. Ltd. Chongqing Zongshen Automobile Air Intake System Manufacturing Co., Ltd. Hong Kong VAS International Development Limited; Zongshen (Canada) Environtech Ltd; Chongqing Zongshen Speed Boat Development Co., Ltd. Jiangsu Zongshen Motor Tricycle Manufacturing Co., Ltd. Jiangsu Zongshen Motor Tricycle Manufacturing Co., Ltd.
- Website: www.zongshenmotor.com zonsenmotor.com

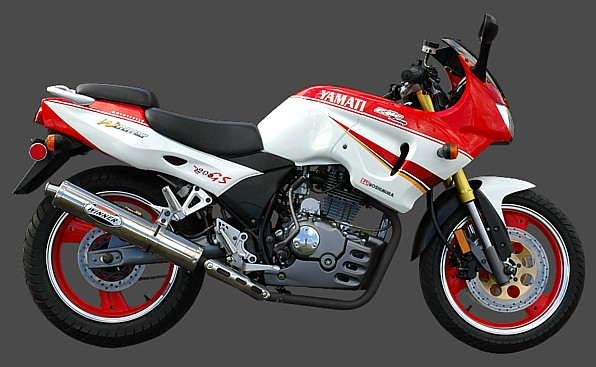
A Zongshen ZS 200 GS

Zongshen (Chinese: 宗申) is a Chinese manufacturing company which produces motorcycles, quad bikes, generators, and engines. It is based in Chongqing, China and claims to have a yearly output of over 1,000,000 motorcycles.

== History ==
Zuo Zongshen founded the Zongshen company in 1992. He founded its predecessor in 1982 as small motorcycle repair shop called "Master Zuo" before expanding into manufacturing.

In 2006, founder Zuo Zongshen was profiled in the Discovery Channel and CBC co-produced documentary China Rises as a member of China's nouveau riche.

In 2007, Zongshen invested CNY300 million into a new research and development center in Chongqing, as part of their "Cyclone" program. The program is designed to produce unique technology and designs for Zongshen's new models and differentiate the brand from a competitive environment of almost identical models.

In 2012, Zongshen exported roughly 30% of its motorcycle production. It re-brands its products in many countries and its products can be seen in the lines of many retailers and distributors in the United Kingdom, Italy, Spain, Portugal, Belarus, Russia, Argentina, Colombia, and Brazil.

== Activities ==
Today, the Zongshen Industrial Group consists of 52 wholly owned or part-owned subsidiary companies. The group has over 20,000 employees, and with total assets worth around 20 billion yuan. It claims to be one of the five largest motorcycle manufacturers in China.

Zongshen Industrial Group also acts as an OEM (Original Equipment Manufacturer) for several other major brands including Harley-Davidson and BMW, primarily manufacturing engines and components for use in various products.

On 16th April 2004, Zongshen Piaggio Foshan Motorcycle Co., Ltd. was established as a joint venture between Italy’s Piaggio Group and China’s Zongshen Industrial Group, combining Piaggio’s European engineering standards, equipment, and management systems with Zongshen’s large-scale manufacturing capabilities at a purpose-built facility in Foshan, Guangdong, producing motorcycles and scooters for Piaggio’s global brands.

Zongshen Group also owns Zongshen PEM, a Canadian subsidiary registered in Vancouver, which sells motorcycles, e-bikes, and electric scooters to the North American market.

The Zongshen Industrial Group is now commercially represented as Zonsen Industrial Group Ltd., with Chongqing Zonsen Automobile Industry Co., Ltd. as a core subsidiary responsible for motorcycle production and R&D.

== Zongshen ZS One / Robinson 125 ==
The Zongshen Z‑One is a series of standard street motorcycles produced by Zongshen Industrial Group (commercially represented as Zonsen Industrial Group Ltd.) featuring single-cylinder, air-cooled four-stroke engines in the 125–150 cc class. These motorcycles are sold in international markets as the Z-One or Z-1, with specifications including an air-cooled engine, five-speed gearbox, and front disc brake.

== KD50QT-4 ==
Zongshen/Kangda Pexma KD50QT-4 is a four-stroke, single-cylinder city-scooter, with an engine displacement of 50 cc.

=== Specifications ===
- Engine type: four-stroke, one-cylinder, air-cooled, OHC, two valves.
- Displacement: 49,7 cc
- Horsepower: 3,4 Bhp (2,5 kW)
- Fuel economy: 54 km/l

== Zongshen ZS 150 GY ==
Zongshen/ZS 150 GY is a four-stroke, single-cylinder street legal supermoto, with an engine displacement of 150 cc.

== Zongshen 200 GS ==
The Zongshen 200 GS, also known as Xplorer z200, zs200GS or 200GS, is the first of Zongshen's sport touring bikes. It was first introduced worldwide in 2004, and is still sold by Zongshen distributors in different countries, despite the release in 2006 of the second Zongshen 250 GS.

The 200GS has a dedicated single-cylinder four-stroke 200 cc engine using a push rod valve system for long-distance engine endurance. The push rod design reduces its top speed, allowing a maximum of 120 km/h (75 mph) speed capability. Pushing the 200GS to very high rpms increase the risk of valve float. The 200GS push-rod engine uses early Honda technology. Owners in the Philippines discovered that many engine parts are compatible or interchangeable with the parts of a Honda TMX-155 engine.

The design uses heavy sports aerodynamics for stability on highways, and a high capacity fuel tank. The engine is air-cooled, requiring the half-fairing design for proper air flow. The starter clutch will break down easily with longer pressing of the starter switch during automatic start. The 200GS does not have ports for saddle-bags, and does not include touring accessories upon purchase.

== Zongshen Racing ==
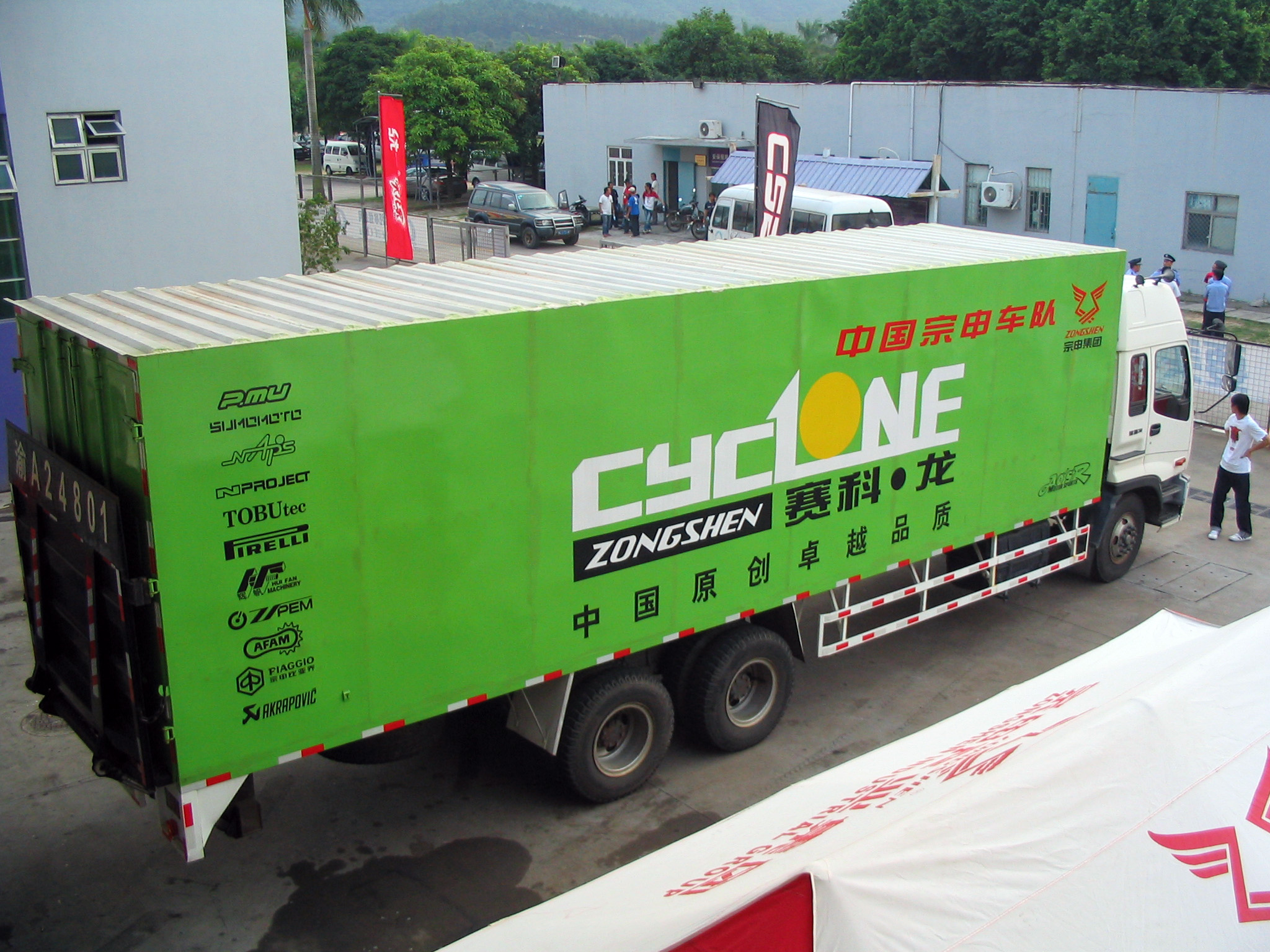
Zongshen Racing's team truck

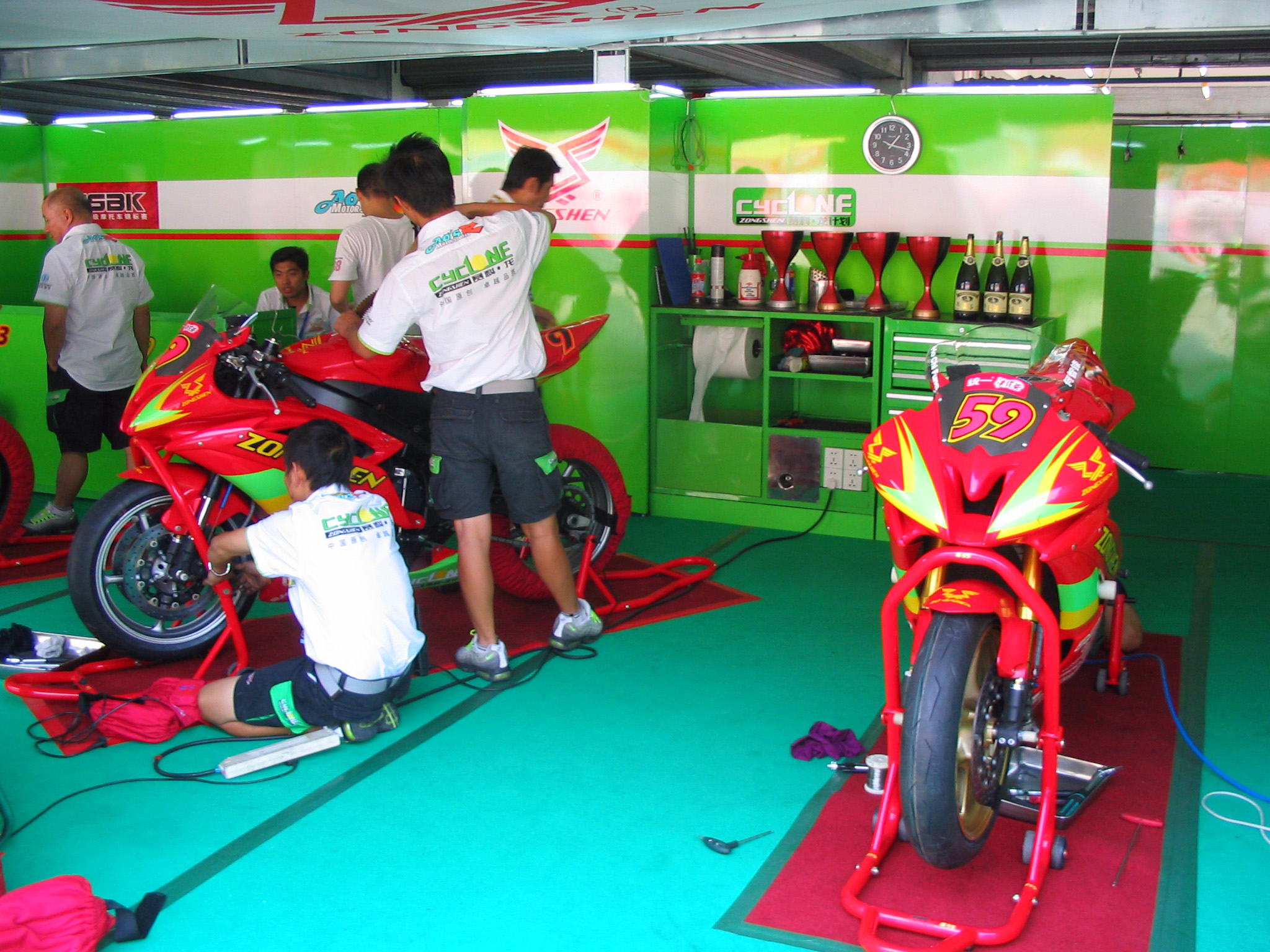
Zongshen Racing's pit garage

Zongshen races in various motorcycle championships as China Zongshen Racing. It is a major competitor in the China Superbike Championship, winning the riders' titles in 2007 and 2008. In 2002, China Zongshen Racing took first and second places in the FIM Endurance World Championship with the French coach Michel Marqueton. In 2003, The Zongshen team took the 5 first races in the Endurance World Championship with the same coach but finished the championship in 2nd place.

Zongshen has also won several FIM E-motorcycle championships (also known as the TTXGP) in recent years, competing against well-funded teams from around the world. While many of the critical parts of Zongshen's electric motorcycle are not strictly produced by Zongshen, they maintain that they developed the motorcycle in-house. The racing e-motorcycle that Zongshen used to win the 2013 TTXGP is powered by a Yasa-750 electric motor. In 2017 Zongshen engaged 5 motorcycles in the 2017 Dakar Rally with 2 French riders, Willy Jobard and Thierry Bethys with the new engine NC 450.

== Zongshen small engines ==
Zongshen manufactures small engines used commonly on garden machinery, power generators and motorcycles.
