= China Superbike Championship =

Motorcycle racing championship

- The official China Superbike logo
- Sport: Motorcycle sport
- Founded: 2007
- Folded: 2008
- No. of teams: 5 or more
- Country: China
- Last champions: (China) Chow Ho-Wan (Rider) (China) Zongshen (Manufacturer)

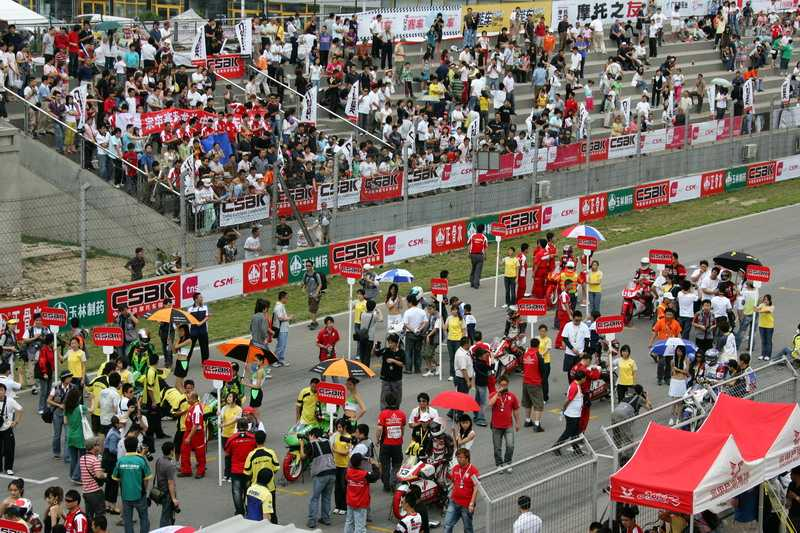
China Superbike Championship at Beijing Goldenport Circuit.

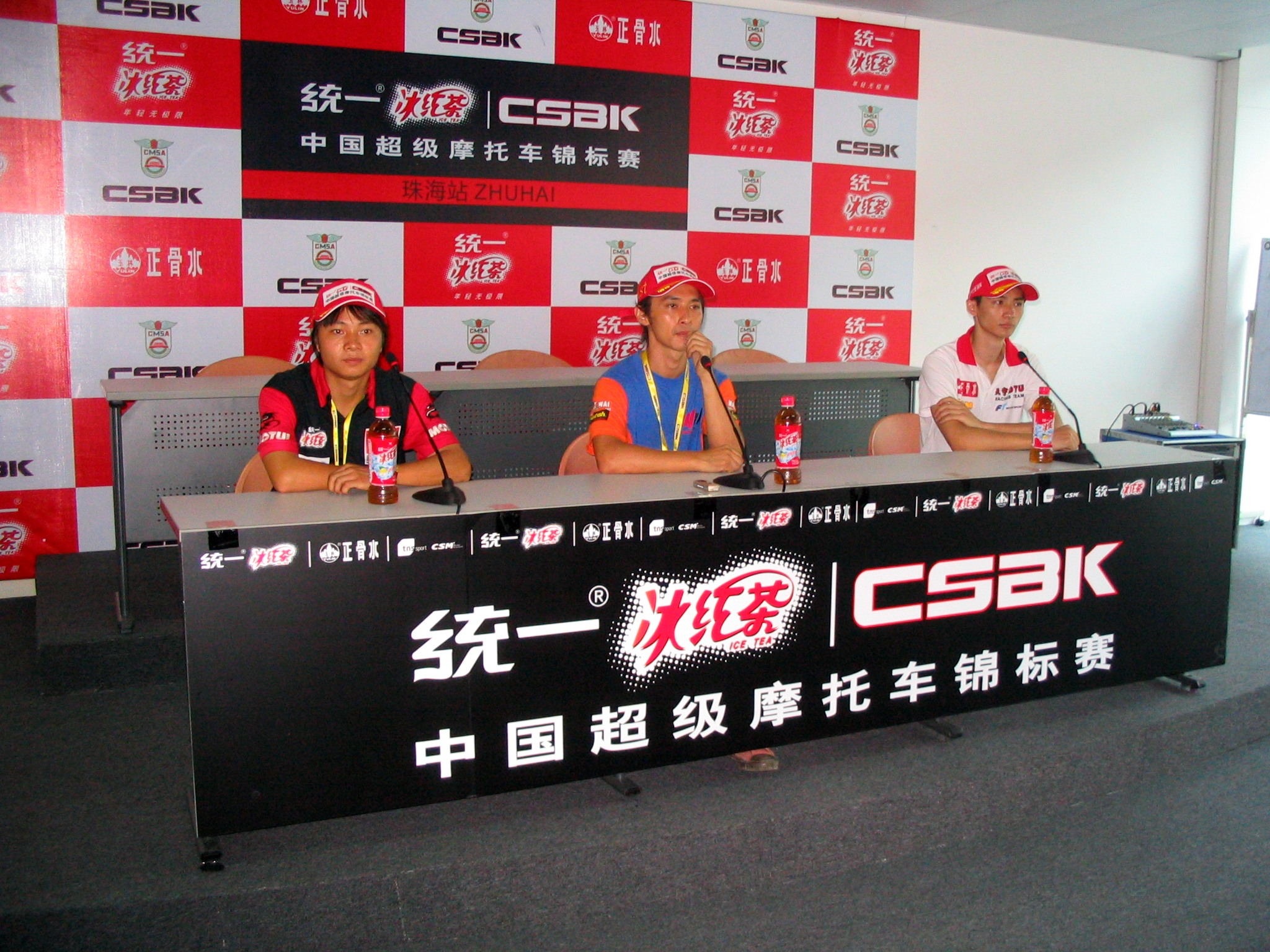
Post Race press conference for 150cc Open class in 2009.

China Superbike Championship (CSBK) is a motorcycle racing championship organized in China by China Motorcycle Sports Association and promoted by Zhuhai International Circuit. It was first established in 2007. The 150cc Open Class allowed for engine modification and Feiying Racing commissioned Wiseco Piston to build and prep 4 race engines for the series. These engines powered Feiying to the 2007 Championship and S&S Racing to the 2008 Championship.

There were four championship rounds in 2007. Two at Zhuhai International Circuit, one at Beijing Goldenport Park Circuit and one at Shanghai's Tianma Circuit. The last China Superbike Championship took place in Tianjin (2019).

== Establishment ==
The China Superbike Championship is established in 2007 by China Motor Sport Association, FIM's Chinese member. The promotional rights and organization responsibilities are granted to Zhuhai International Circuit, China.

== Regulations ==
CSBK has three technical classes, they are:

- 150cc Open class
- GP125cc
- Supersports 600cc

GP125cc is also divided into GP125A and GP125B for riders of different experience, though they race together.

Only Chinese riders (including riders from Hong Kong SAR, Macau SAR and Taiwan) are admitted to the championship.

== Champions ==
CSBK Riders' Champions
Season	Class	Rider	Team	Bike
2008	Supersports 600cc	(Hong Kong) Chow Ho-Wan	China Zongshen Racing	Yamaha R6
2008	GP125ccB	(China) Zhang Hai-Long	Lingken Racing	.
2008	GP125ccA	(China) Zeng Jian-Heng	China Zongshen Racing	.
2008	150cc Open	(China) Gao Lei	S&S Racing	.
2007	Supersports 600cc	(China) Wang Zhu	China Zongshen Racing	Yamaha R6
2007	GP125cc B	(China) Zhang Hai-Long	Lingken Racing	.
2007	GP125cc A	(China) Xiao Jin	Yes! Yamaha Tianjin Racing	.
2007	150cc Open	(China) Wu Xia	Feiying Racing	.

=== 2007 schedule ===
- 9–10 June: Zhuhai International Circuit
- 14–15 July: Goldenport Park Circuit, Beijing
- 25–26 August: Tianma Circuit, Shanghai
- 1 – 2 Oct: Zhuhai International Circuit

=== 2008 schedule ===
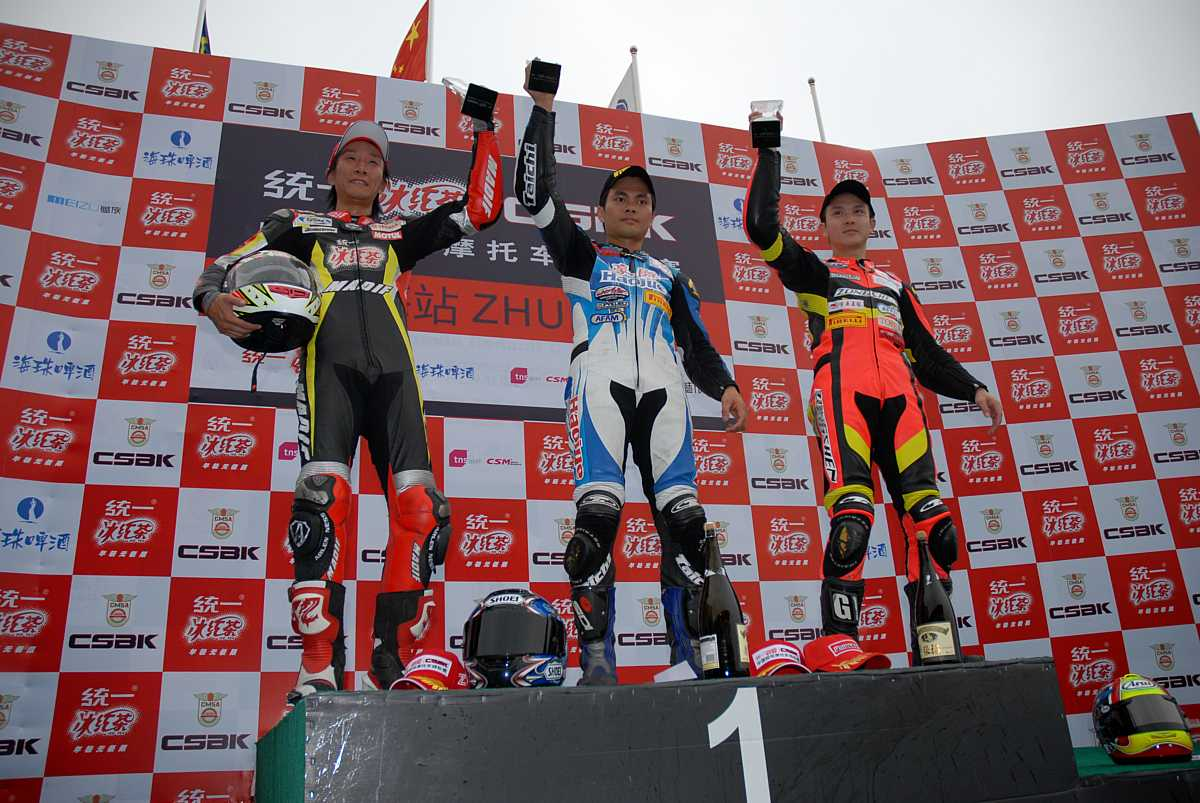
CSBK 600cc podium at Zhuhai.

- 29–30 March: Zhuhai International Circuit
- 19–20 April: Tianma Circuit, Shanghai
- 31 May – 1 June: Goldenport Park Circuit, Beijing
- 11 – 12 Oct: Zhuhai International Circuit
