= National Go Championship =

Chinese Go competition

The National Go Championship is a Go competition which determines the national champion of China. It is managed by the Chinese Weiqi Association.
