= Alexandre Bardinon =

French-Swiss racing driver (born 2002)

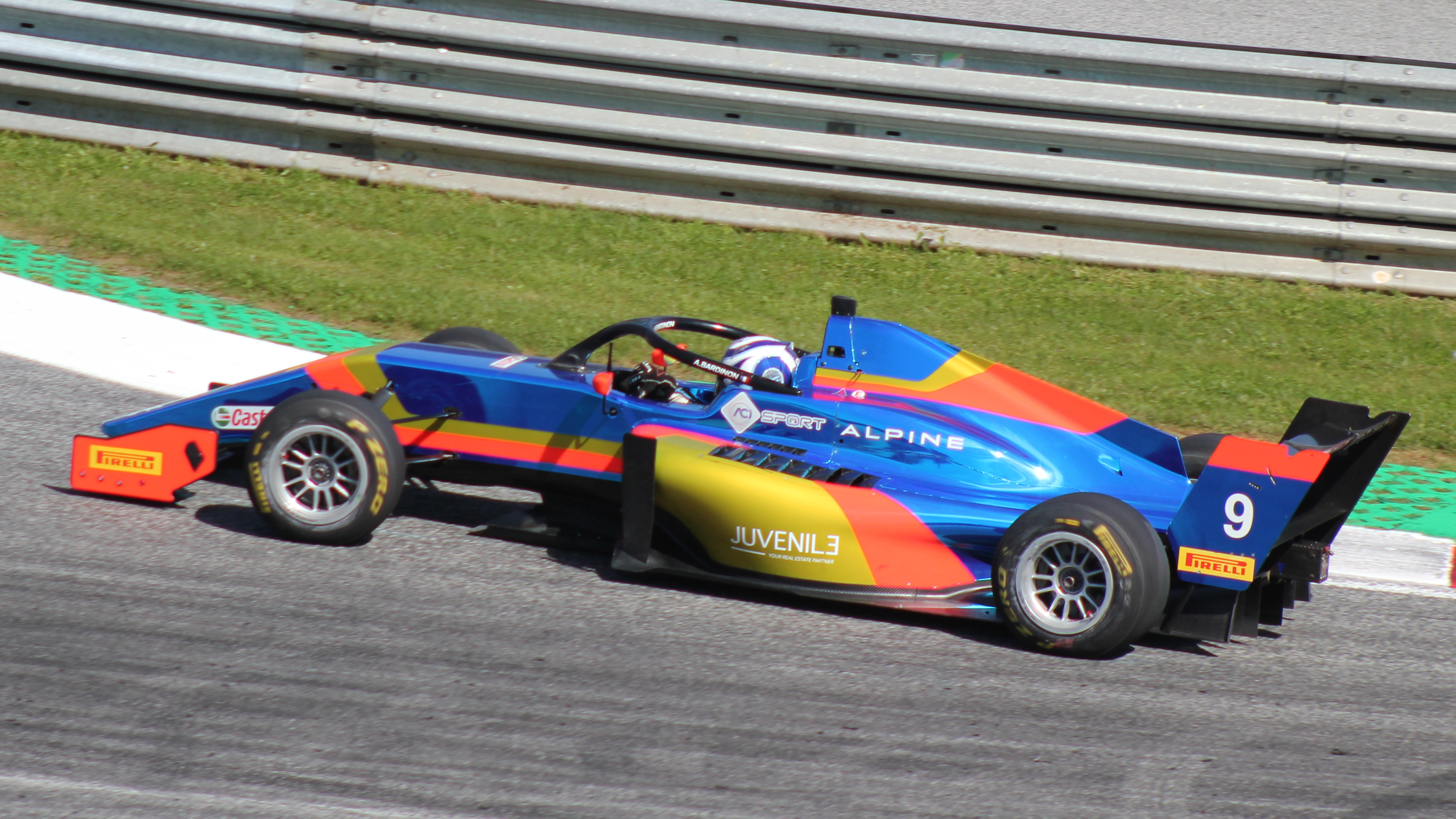
- Bardinon in 2021
- Nationality: (France) French
- Born: 9 May 2002 (age 24) Geneva, Switzerland
- Relatives: Pierre Bardinon (grandfather); Patrick Bardinon (father)

Formula Regional European Championship career
- Debut season: 2019
- Current team: FA Racing by MP
- Categorisation: FIA Silver
- Car number: 9
- Former teams: Van Amersfoort Racing
- Starts: 27 (30 entries)
- Wins: 0
- Podiums: 0
- Poles: 0
- Fastest laps: 0
- Best finish: 20th in 2019

Previous series
- 2021 2020 2018: F3 Asian Championship; Euroformula Open Championship; V de V Challenge Monoplace

Alexandre Bardinon (born 9 May 2002) is a French-Swiss former racing driver who last competed in the 2021 Formula Regional European Championship under a French license for FA Racing. He is the grandson of French businessman and Ferrari collector Pierre Bardinon and the son of racing driver Patrick Bardinon, who raced in the 80's within the Formula 3 and Formula 2 championships. He is the current owner of the Circuit du Mas du Clos, a race track founded by his grandfather in 1963.

== Career ==
=== Debut in cars ===
In 2018, Bardinon started his racing career as he drove in the French GT4 Cup for M Racing - YMR where he achieved one podium. He also raced in V de V Challenge Monoplace for Formula Motorsport, where he once again achieved one podium finish.

=== Formula Regional European Championship ===
In 2019, Bardinon signed with Mas du Clos racing for the race at Vallelunga where he finished 13th and 12th respective at both rounds. He then made the switch the VAR for the remaining rounds with the highest finish of ninth at the Hungaroring. He finished the season last with five points.

=== Euroformula Open Championship ===
Bardinon would race for Van Amersfoort Racing alongside the Estner brothers Sebastian and Andreas in 2020.

== Racing record ==
=== Career summary ===
Season	Series	Team	Races	Wins	Poles	F/Laps	Podiums	Points	Position
2018	French GT4 Cup - Am	M Racing - YMR	2	0	0	0	0	12	27th
2018	French GT4 Cup - Pro-Am	M Racing - YMR	6	0	0	0	1	29	16th
2018	V de V Challenge Monoplace	Formula Motorsport	2	0	0	0	1	57	24th
2019	Formula Regional European Championship	Mas du Clos Racing Team	3	0	0	0	0	0	20th
2019	Formula Regional European Championship	Van Amersfoort Racing	17	0	0	0	0	5	20th
2020	Euroformula Open Championship	Van Amersfoort Racing	18	0	0	0	0	9	16th
2021	Formula Regional European Championship	FA Racing by MP	19	0	0	0	0	0	33rd
2021	F3 Asian Championship	Pinnacle Motorsport	15	0	0	0	0	0	20th
2021	TCR China Touring Car Championship	BlackArts Racing Team	4	0	0	0	2	48	8th

=== Complete Formula Regional European Championship results ===
(key) (Races in bold indicate pole position) (Races in italics indicate fastest lap)

Year	Entrant	1	2	3	4	5	6	7	8	9	10	11	12	13	14	15	16	17	18	19	20	21	22	23	24	25	DC	Points
2019	Van Amersfoort Racing	LEC; 1	LEC; 2	LEC; 3	VLL; 1; 13	VLL; 2; 12	VLL; 3 C†	HUN; 1; 11	HUN; 2 Ret	HUN; 3; 9	RBR; 1 Ret	RBR; 2 Ret	RBR; 3 DNS	IMO; 1; 12	IMO; 2; 13	IMO; 3 Ret	IMO; 4; 10	CAT; 1; 11	CAT; 2; 11	CAT; 3; 11	MUG; 1; 14	MUG; 2; 13	MUG; 3; 12	MNZ; 1; 10	MNZ; 2; 11	MNZ; 3; 11	20th	5
2021	FA Racing by MP	IMO; 1; 24	IMO; 2 Ret	CAT; 1; 26	CAT; 2; 26	MCO; 1 DNQ	MCO; 2; 18	LEC; 1; 26	LEC; 2; 23	ZAN; 1; 26	ZAN; 2; 27	SPA; 1 Ret	SPA; 2 Ret	RBR; 1; 30†	RBR; 2 Ret	VAL; 1 Ret	VAL; 2; 28	MUG; 1; 28	MUG; 2; 31	MNZ; 1; 20	MNZ; 2; 29						33rd	0

^{†} The third race in Vallelunga was cancelled due to bad weather and later run in Imola as a fourth race.

=== Complete Euroformula Open Championship results ===
(key) (Races in bold indicate pole position) (Races in italics indicate fastest lap)

Year	Team	1	2	3	4	5	6	7	8	9	10	11	12	13	14	15	16	17	18	Pos	Points
2020	Van Amersfoort Racing	HUN; 1; 12	HUN; 2; 8	LEC; 1; 12	LEC; 2; 12	RBR; 1; 11	RBR; 2; 9	MNZ; 1 Ret	MNZ; 2 Ret	MNZ; 3; 12	MUG; 1; 10	MUG; 2 Ret	SPA; 1; 13	SPA; 2; 10	SPA; 3; 11	CAT; 1; 11	CAT; 2; 14	CAT; 3; 10	CAT; 4 Ret	16th	9

=== Complete F3 Asian Championship results ===
(key) (Races in bold indicate pole position) (Races in italics indicate the fastest lap of top ten finishers)

Year	Entrant	1	2	3	4	5	6	7	8	9	10	11	12	13	14	15	DC	Points
2021	Pinnacle Motorsport	DUB; 1; 18	DUB; 2; 17	DUB; 3 Ret	ABU; 1; 15	ABU; 2; 12	ABU; 3; 12	ABU; 1; 14	ABU; 2 Ret	ABU; 3; 13	DUB; 1 Ret	DUB; 2; 13	DUB; 3 Ret	ABU; 1 Ret	ABU; 2; 17	ABU; 3 Ret	20th	0
