= Pierre Bardinon =

French businessman (1931–2012)

- Born: 1931
- Died: August 2012 (aged 80–81)
- Occupation: businessman

Pierre Bardinon (1931 – August 2012) was a French businessman and collector of Ferrari cars.

Pierre Bardinon was born in 1931, an heir of the Chapal family. He later inherited their leather and fur business.

Bardinon owned the Circuit du Mas du Clos racing track near his "Mas du Clos" estate near Aubusson in central France.

He had three children, Patrick, Anne and Jean-Francois Bardinon. Anne and Jean-Francois sued Patrick for breach of trust after he sold Ferrari 250 GTO for Euro 38 million to a Taiwanese buyer in 2014, and although they lost the case, the appeals court in Limoges ruled in their favour in 2020, and ordered Patrick to pay Euro 52.3 million euros to their common inheritance fund.

His grandson Alexandre Bardinon, son of Patrick, is a racing driver.
