= Shanghai Tianma Circuit =

Motorsport race track in China

Tianma Circuit
- Full Circuit (2004–present)
- Location: Songjiang, Shanghai, People's Republic of China
- Coordinates: 31°4′39″N 121°6′55″E
- FIA Grade: 4 (Note: Shanghai Tianma Circuit's Grade 4 license expired 7 February 2026.)
- Opened: 26 September 2004; 22 years ago
- Major events: Former: TCR Asia (2021–2022); TCR China (2020–2021); WTCC Race of China (2011); CTCC (2009–2022); CSBK (2007–2008, 2010–2011); Formula Pilota China (2011)
- Website: https://www.stc2002.com

Full Circuit (2004–present)
- Length: 2.063 km (1.282 mi)
- Turns: 14
- Race lap record: 1:00.525 ( (Switzerland) Mathéo Tuscher, Tatuus FA010, 2011, FA)

Shanghai Tianma Circuit (simplified Chinese: 上海天马山赛车场; traditional Chinese: 上海天馬山賽車場; pinyin: Shànghǎi Tiānmǎshān Sàichēchǎng) is a permanent racing circuit located at the junction of G15_{03} motorway and Shenzhuan Road, in Sheshan, Songjiang District, Shanghai, People's Republic of China. Inaugurated in 2004, the circuit is part of a resort which includes a 10,000-metre square proving ground, a 4X4 course, media center and grandstand, a cinema showing motoring-related films, a multifunctional hall, VIP rooms, a clubhouse that provide Chinese and western meals, a gym, a mini-supermarket, and a shop for motor racing supplies.

== The circuit ==
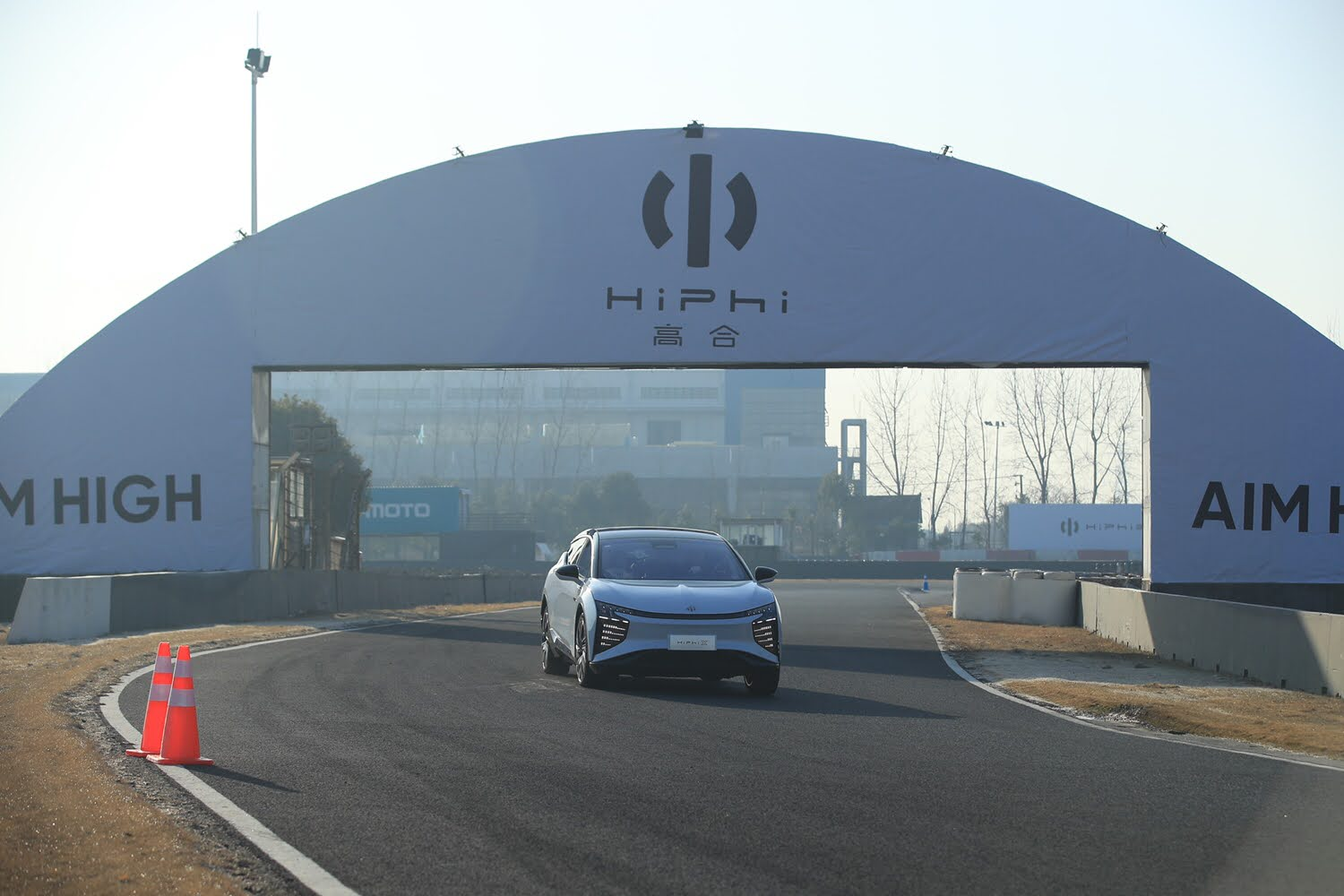
Test drive held at the Shanghai Tianma Circuit

The Formula 3 circuit is 2.063 km (1.282 mi) long in distance with 8 left turns and 6 right turns. There are 4 turns with the width of 14 meters.

It held a round of the China Superbike Championship (CSBK). On September 30, 2011, it was announced that the Chinese round of the 2011 WTCC would be hosted by the Tianma Circuit.

== Lap records ==
As of October 2020, the official fastest race lap records at the Shanghai Tianma Circuit are listed as:

Category	Time	Driver	Vehicle	Event
Full Circuit (2004–present): 2.063 km (1.282 mi)
Formula Abarth	1:00.525	Mathéo Tuscher	Tatuus FA010	2011 Tianma Formula Pilota China round
TCR Touring Car	1:06.007	Ma Qinghua	Lynk & Co 03 TCR	2020 Tianma TCR China round
Super 2000	1:06.080	Yvan Muller	Chevrolet RML Cruze TC1	2011 FIA WTCC Race of China
