= Goldenport Park Circuit =

Motorsport race track in China

- Full Circuit (2001–present)
- Location: Jinzhan Township, Chaoyang District, Beijing, China
- Coordinates: 40°0′54.71″N 116°33′40.63″E
- FIA Grade: 3 (Note: Goldenport Park Circuit's Grade 3 license expired on 7 February 2026.)
- Opened: December 2001; 24 years ago
- Architect: Michael McDonough
- Major events: Former: GT Asia Series (2017); F4 China (2015–2017); WTCC Race of China, Beijing (2014); FIA GT1 World Championship (2011); China Superbike Championship (2007–2009, 2011); Asian Formula Renault Challenge (2005–2007, 2009); Asian Touring Car Series (2003–2006); Formula BMW Asia (2004–2006)
- Website: http://www.goldenport.com.cn/

Full Circuit (2001–present)
- Length: 2.390 km (1.485 mi)
- Race lap record: 1:05.382 ( (United Kingdom) Tom Chilton, Chevrolet RML Cruze TC1, 2014, TC1)

Goldenport Park Circuit (simplified Chinese: 北京金港国际赛车场; traditional Chinese: 北京金港國際賽車場) is a permanent circuit in Jinzhan Township, Chaoyang District, Beijing, People's Republic of China, which is located 10 km (6.2 mi) north of Beijing. designed by Australian Michael McDonough. The circuit was opened in December 2001 and the development also includes a 4X4 Course, a cinema, a motel and a trading place named as "Auto Mall" trading new and second hand cars.

== History ==
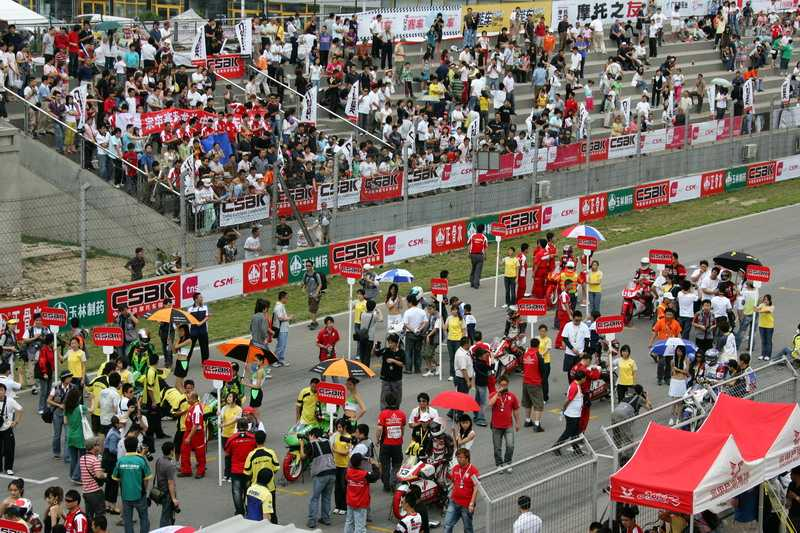
China Superbike Championship at Goldenport Park Circuit.

It held the Beijing round of China Circuit Championship (CCC) for touring cars and China Superbike Championship (CSBK). The circuit became a replacement round of the 2011 FIA GT1 World Championship season after the Curitiba round had been cancelled. The race took place the week after the round held in Ordos, which is also located in China.

In 2014, Goldenport was added to the 2014 World Touring Car Championship season calendar after logistics regarding shipping for overseas rounds forced the FIA to remove the United States race at Sonoma Raceway in California, and add the third Chinese race (Shanghai and Macau are the other two).

== The circuit ==
The circuit is 2.390 km (1.485 mi) long in distance with the width between 12–20 m (39–66 ft). It is a FIA Class 3 Homologated Circuit with 2 grandstands and 25 pit garages. The circuit has a very smooth surface and very little grip on several sections.

As of October 2014, the official fastest race lap records at the Goldenport Park Circuit are listed as:

Category	Time	Driver	Vehicle	Event
Full Circuit (2001–present): 2.390 km (1.485 mi)
TC1	1:05.382	Tom Chilton	Chevrolet RML Cruze TC1	2014 FIA WTCC Race of China, Beijing
Formula BMW	1:05.435	Sam Abay	Mygale FB02	2006 Beijing Formula BMW Asia round
Super 2000	1:08.020	Franz Engstler	BMW 320 TC	2014 FIA WTCC Race of China, Beijing
GT1	1:11.231	Maxime Martin	Matech Ford GT1	2011 Beijing FIA GT1 round
