= Porsche Carrera Cup =

One-make racing series by Porsche

- Category: One-make racing by Porsche
- Country: International; Australia; Asia; Brazil; Canada; France; Germany; Middle East; United Kingdom; United States; Italy; Japan; North America; Scandinavia; Benelux; Singapore
- Constructors: Porsche
- Official website: porsche.com/international

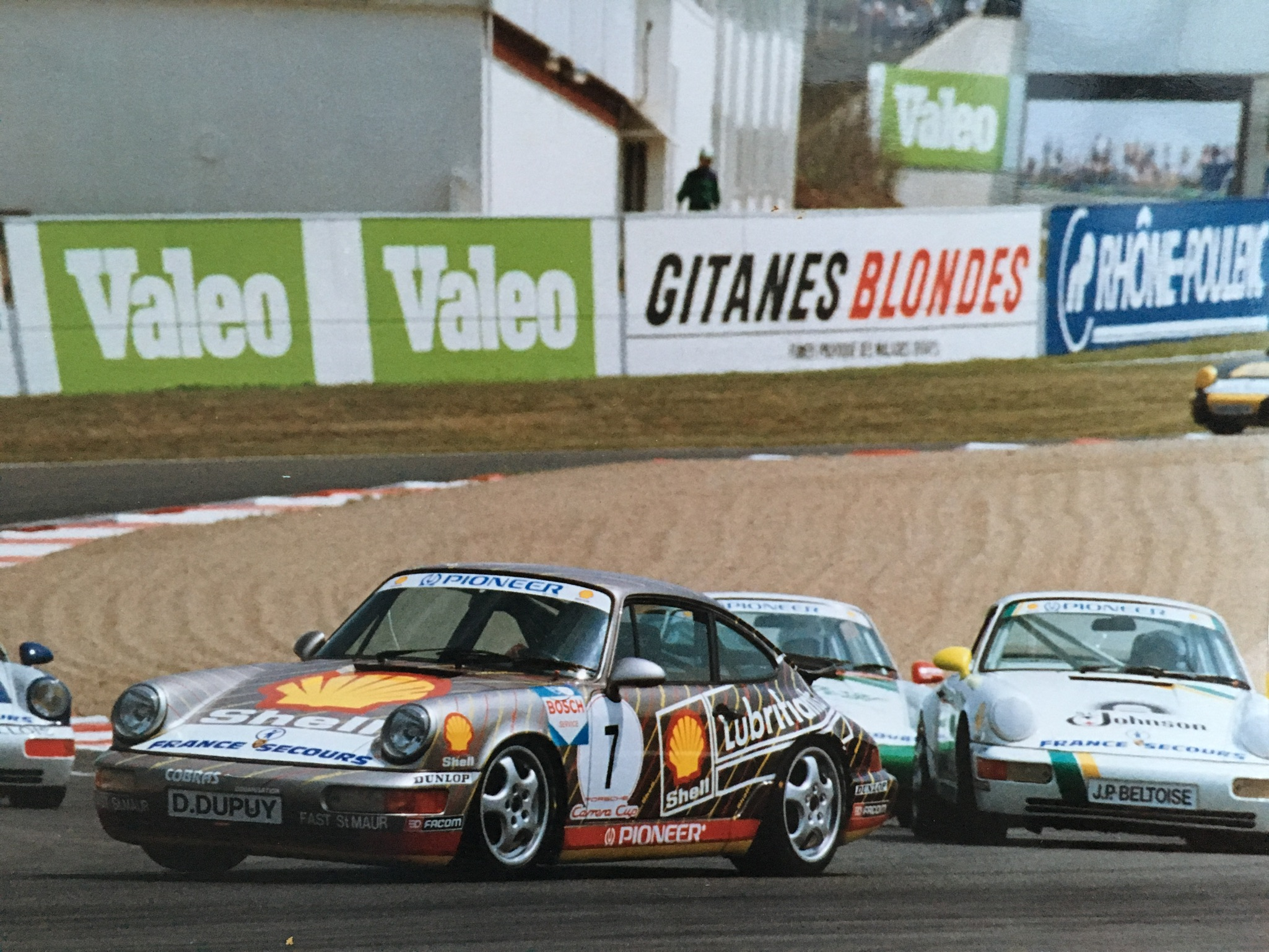
1st-generation 964 cup cars competing in 1991

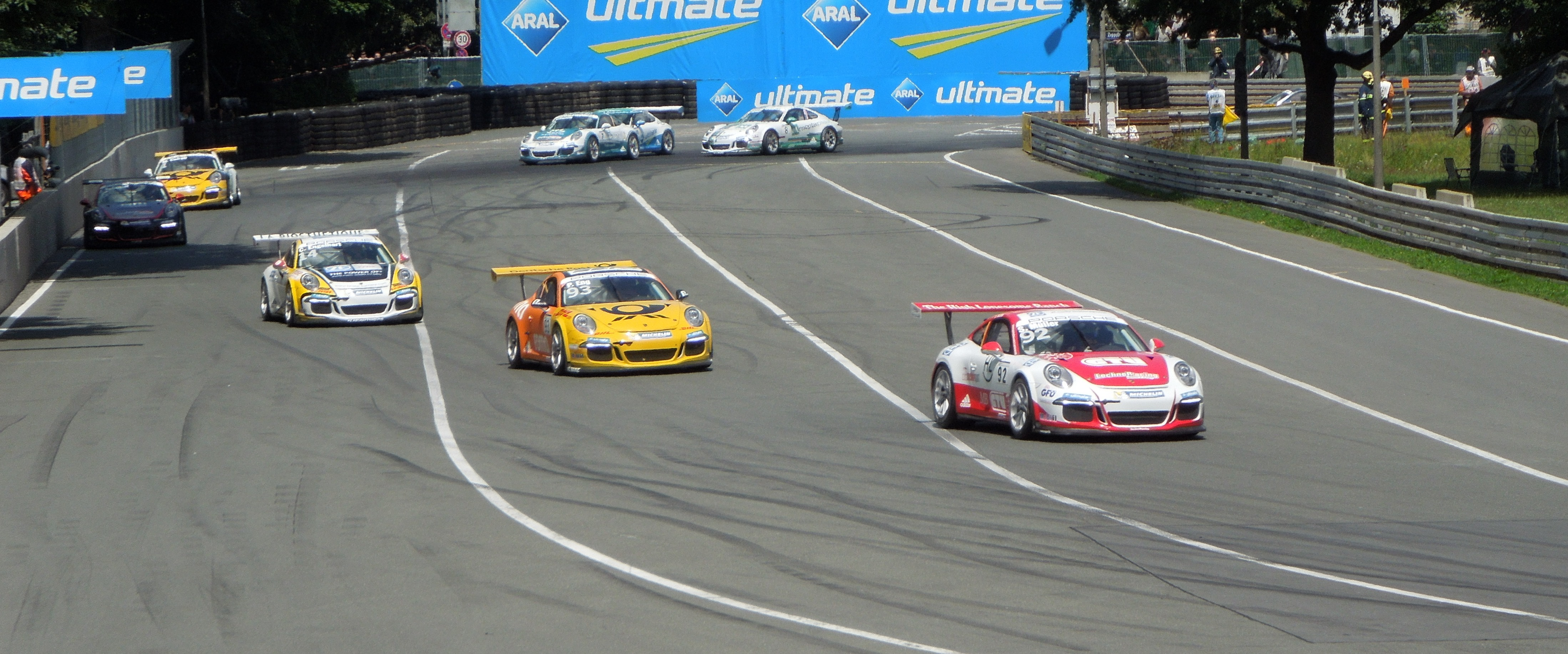
Porsche Carrera Cup race at the Norisring in 2015

Porsche Carrera Cup (sometimes abbreviated PCC) is a number of one-make racing by Porsche premier series competed with initially Porsche 911 Carrera Cup and then Porsche 911 GT3 Cup cars. The cars are specifically built by Porsche for one-make racing, but are visually and mechanically quite similar to road-registrable 911s of the same generation.

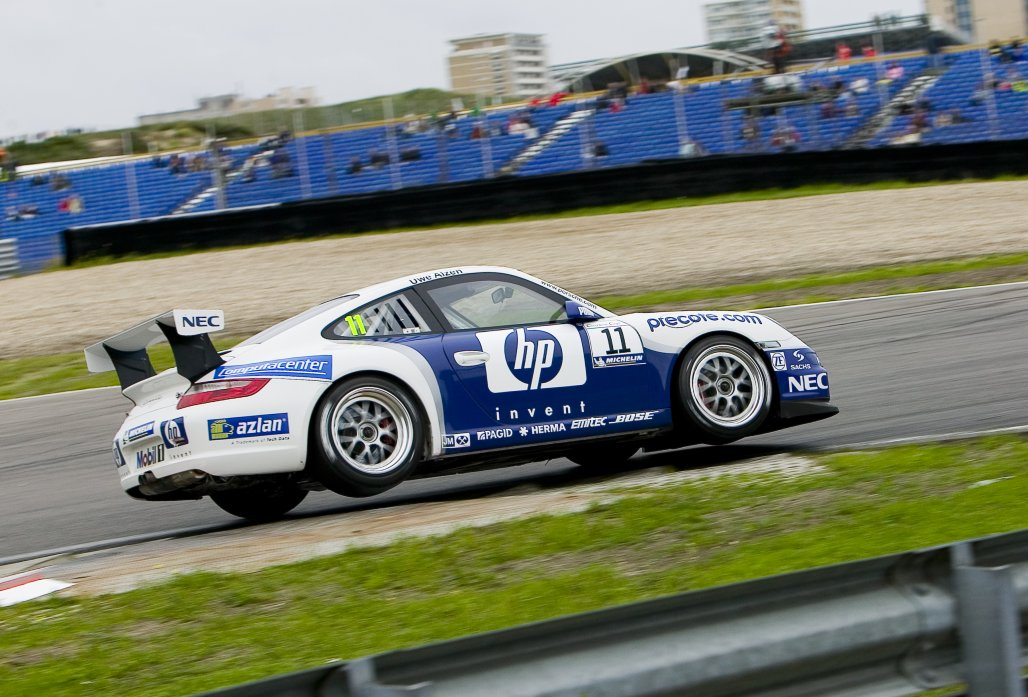
Uwe Alzen driving in a Porsche Carrera Cup Germany 997 cup car in 2006

== Championship Hierarchy ==
There are three distinct tiers of racing, the top tier is the Porsche Supercup. Today the Supercup races as part of the support program of the FIA Formula 1 World Championship on most, if not all, of the Grands Prix held in Europe, and occasionally Grands Prix in Asia and North America. Established in 1993, it is the most prestigious one-make series for GT cars.

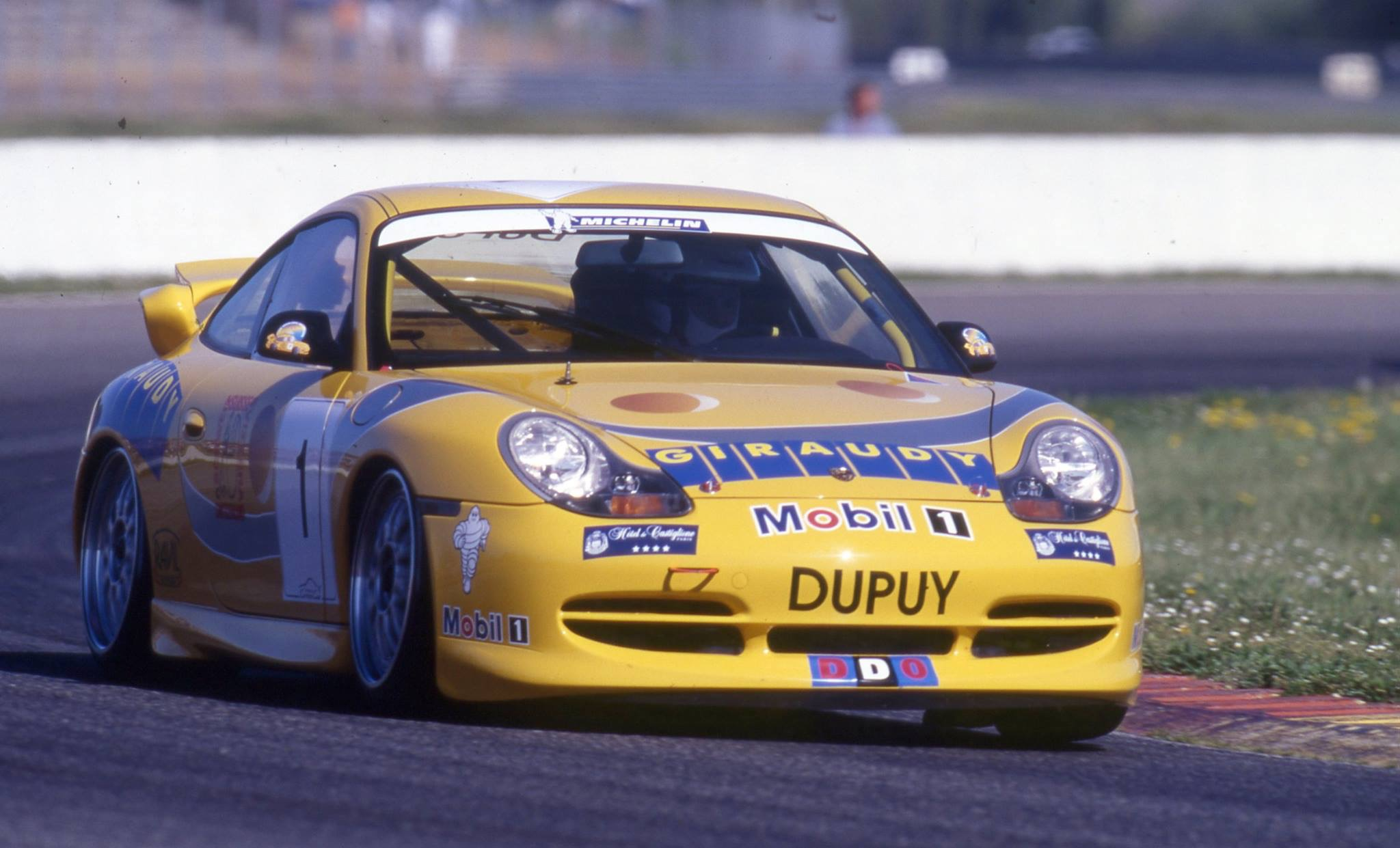
Dominique Dupuy driving a Porsche Carrera Cup France 996 cup car in 1999

The second tier are the national Carrera Cups, held in Australia, France, Germany, Italy, Japan and the United Kingdom as well as International Carrera Cups held across multiple nations in eastern Asia and in the Scandinavian nations of Denmark, Finland, Norway and Sweden. The longest running is the Porsche Carrera Cup Germany, which was also the original series, first held in 1986 using the Porsche 964 Cup racing car. It has been one of the world's best known Pro-Am GT series and helped to progress many future World Endurance Champions, Le Mans winners and today is the primary feeder for the Porsche Supercup with many racing teams contesting both series. The Porsche Carrera Cup France began just a year later in 1987. The early 2000s saw a proliferation of Carrera Cups with Great Britain, Australia, Asia and Scandinavia all starting in a four-year burst with Italy following in 2007.

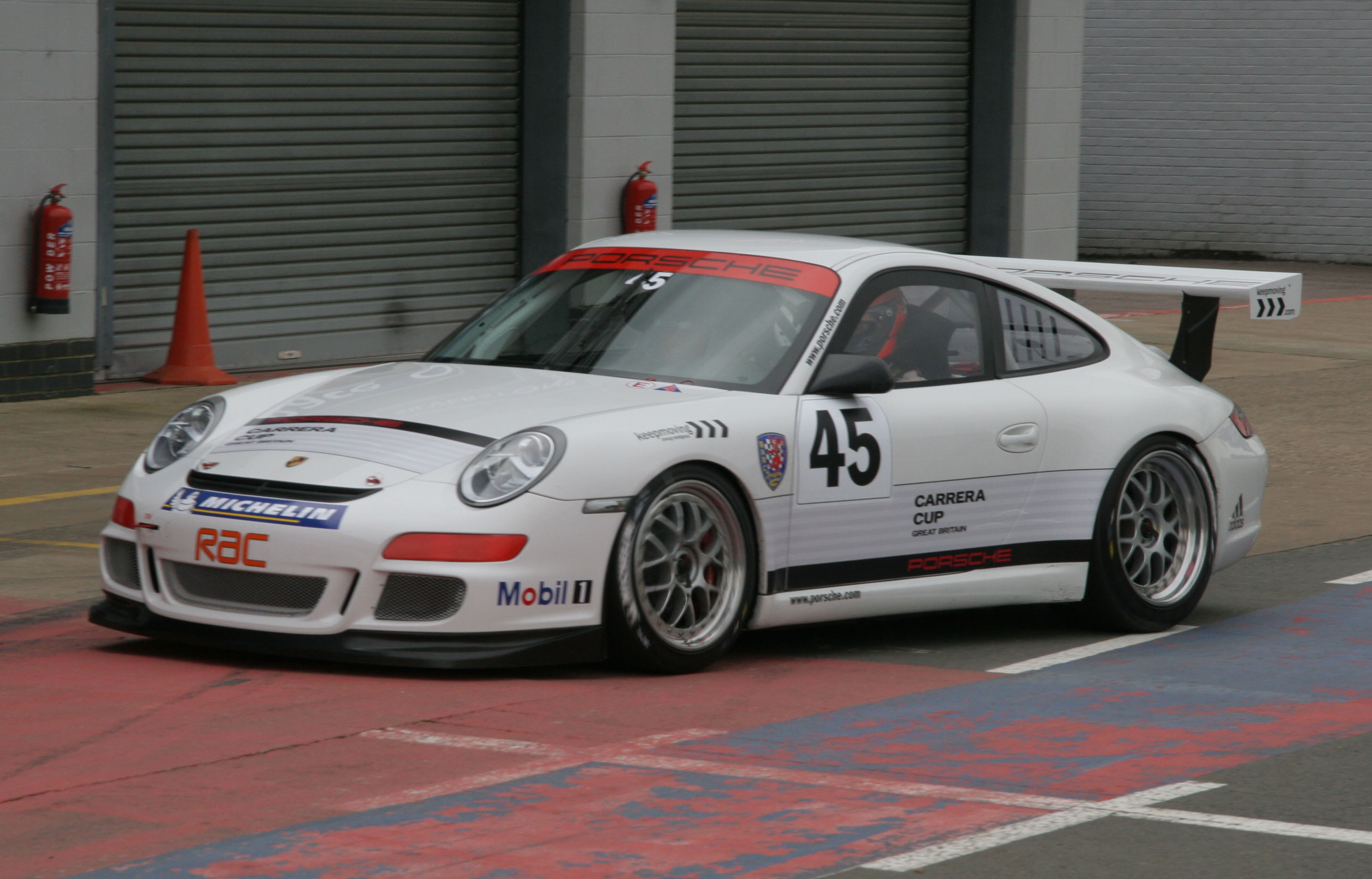
Porsche Carrera Cup 997 cup car at Silverstone in 2008

The third tier is the Porsche GT3 Cup Challenge or Porsche GT3 Cup Trophy, recently renamed in some markets as the Porsche Sprint Challenge. This is a mixture of smaller series in Europe, Switzerland based series, Benelux series held across Belgium, the Netherlands and Luxembourg, a Central European series, a Middle East series in the Gulf States, as well as larger series in the Americas; United States, Brazil and Argentina. As well as New Zealand and some which act as a second tier series within Carrera Cup nations. Some GT3 Cup Challenge series will use older Carrera Cup cars from previous generations of the Porsche 911. New Zealand and Australian GT3 Cup Challenges use second hand cars from Carrera Cup Australia series as an example, although largers series, particularly United States and Brazil are effectively Carrera Cups. GT3 Cup Trophies are essentially second tier GT3 Cup Challenges. Superseded Carrera Cup and GT3 Cup Cars have also become popular cars to race in domestic GT series on five continents.

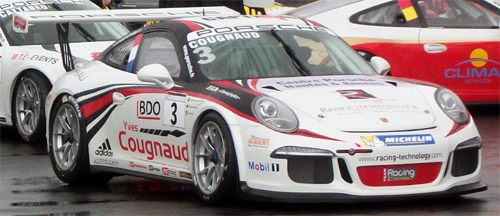
2014 Porsche Carrera Cup France 991 cup car of Alexandre Cougnaud

== Historic Milestones and Notable Drivers ==
Dutch racer Patrick Huisman is the most successful Carrera Cup racer having won four Supercups consecutively between 1997 and 2000. German driver René Rast won three Supercups (2010–12) and two German Carrera Cups (2008 & 2012). Dominique Dupuy won the French Carrera Cup five times between 1992 and 1999 and New Zealander Craig Baird won the Australian Carrera Cup five times between 2006 and 2013. Christophe Bouchut won the French Carrera Cup four times around Dupuy's five titles, the two dominating the French series for a decade. Dutch driver Larry ten Voorde is currently the defending champion of the Porsche Supercup.

== Influence on the Motorsport Industry ==
The one-make GT series model has also been used for other Porsche models, usually the entry level Porsche of the time (924, 944, 968 and Boxster) and has proliferated to other manufacturers as well; Ferrari Challenge, Lamborghini Super Trofeo, Trofeo Maserati, Audi R8 LMS Cup, Lotus Cup, MGF Trophy and a multitude of series based on the Mazda MX-5.

== Championships ==
=== International ===
- Porsche Supercup
- Porsche Carrera World Cup
- International Race of Champions USA (IROC I)

=== Carrera Cup ===
- Porsche Carrera Cup Asia
- Porsche Carrera Cup Australia
- Porsche Carrera Cup Benelux
- Porsche Carrera Cup Brasil
- Porsche Carrera Cup France
- Porsche Carrera Cup Germany
- Porsche Carrera Cup Great Britain
- Porsche Carrera Cup Italy
- Porsche Carrera Cup Japan
- Porsche Carrera Cup Scandinavia
- Porsche Carrera Cup North America
- Porsche Carrera Cup Middle East

=== Sprint Challenge ===
- Porsche GT3 Cup Trophy Argentina
- Porsche Sprint Challenge Australia
- Porsche Sprint Challenge Benelux
- Porsche Sprint Challenge Brasil
- Porsche Sprint Challenge Central Europe
- Porsche Sprint Challenge China
- Porsche Sprint Challenge France
- Porsche Sprint Challenge Germany
- Porsche Sprint Challenge Great Britain
- Porsche Sprint Challenge Iberica
- Porsche Sprint Challenge Indonesia
- Porsche Sprint Challenge Japan
- Porsche Sprint Challenge Middle East
- Porsche Sprint Challenge North America
- Porsche Sprint Challenge North European Zone
- Porsche Sprint Challenge Scandinavia
- Porsche Sprint Challenge Southern Europe
- Porsche Sprint Challenge Suisse
- Porsche Sprint Trophy Thailand
- Porsche Sprint Challenge USA West

=== Endurance ===
- Porsche Endurance Trophy Benelux
- Porsche Endurance Challenge Brasil
- Porsche Endurance Challenge Germany
- Porsche Endurance Trophy Nürburgring
- Porsche Endurance Trophy New Zealand
- Porsche Endurance Challenge North America

== Champions ==
=== Europe ===
Carrera Cup Germany		Carrera Cup France		Carrera Cup Great Britain		Carrera Cup Scandinavia		Carrera Cup Italia		Carrera Cup Benelux	
Season	Driver	Season	Driver	Season	Driver	Season	Driver	Season	Driver	Season	Driver
1986	(Germany) Joachim Winkelhock	Not Held		Not Held		Not Held		Not Held		Not Held	
1987	(Germany) Roland Asch	1987	(France) René Metge	Not Held		Not Held		Not Held		Not Held	
1988	(Germany) Roland Asch	1988	(France) André Bourdon	Not Held		Not Held		Not Held		Not Held	
1989	(Germany) Roland Asch	1989	(France) Michel Maisonneuve	Not Held		Not Held		Not Held		Not Held	
1990	(Germany) Olaf Manthey	1990	(France) Michel Maisonneuve	Not Held		Not Held		Not Held		Not Held	
1991	(Germany) Roland Asch	1991	(France) Jean-Pierre Malcher	Not Held		Not Held		Not Held		Not Held	
1992	(Germany) Uwe Alzen	1992	(France) Dominique Dupuy	Not Held		Not Held		Not Held		Not Held	
1993	(Germany) Wolfgang Land	1993	(France) Dominique Dupuy	Not Held		Not Held		Not Held		Not Held	
1994	(Germany) Bernd Mayländer	1994	(France) Christophe Bouchut	Not Held		Not Held		Not Held		Not Held	
1995	(Germany) Harald Grohs	1995	(France) Christophe Bouchut	Not Held		Not Held		Not Held		Not Held	
1996	(Germany) Ralf Kelleners	1996	(France) Christophe Bouchut	Not Held		Not Held		Not Held		Not Held	
1997	(Germany) Wolfgang Land	1997	(France) Dominique Dupuy	Not Held		Not Held		Not Held		Not Held	
1998	(Germany) Dirk Müller	1998	(France) Dominique Dupuy	Not Held		Not Held		Not Held		Not Held	
1999	(Germany) Lucas Luhr	1999	(France) Dominique Dupuy	Not Held		Not Held		Not Held		Not Held	
2000	(Germany) Jörg Bergmeister	2000	(France) Christophe Bouchut	Not Held		Not Held		Not Held		Not Held	
2001	(Germany) Timo Bernhard	2001	(France) Philippe Gache	Not Held		Not Held		Not Held		Not Held	
2002	(Germany) Marc Lieb	2002	(France) Sébastian Dumez	Not Held		Not Held		Not Held		Not Held	
2003	(Germany) Frank Stippler	2003	(France) Sébastian Dumez	2003	(United Kingdom) Barry Horne	Not Held		Not Held		Not Held	
2004	(Germany) Mike Rockenfeller	2004	(France) James Ruffier	2004	(United Kingdom) Richard Westbrook	2004	(Sweden) Robin Rudholm	Not Held		Not Held	
2005	(Germany) Christian Menzel	2005	(France) Anthony Beltoise	2005	(Republic of Ireland) Damien Faulkner	2005	(Sweden) Fredrik Ros	Not Held		Not Held	
2006	(Germany) Dirk Werner	2006	(France) Anthony Beltoise	2006	(Republic of Ireland) Damien Faulkner	2006	(Sweden) Fredrik Ros	Not Held		Not Held	
2007	(Germany) Uwe Alzen	2007	(France) Patrick Pilet	2009	(United Kingdom) James Sutton	2007	(Sweden) Edward Sandström	2007	(Italy) Andrea Boldrini	Not Held	
2008	(Germany) René Rast	2008	(France) Anthony Beltoise	2009	(United Kingdom) Tim Harvey	2008	(Sweden) Jocke Mangs	2008	(Italy) Luigi Ferrara	Not Held	
2009	(Germany) Thomas Jäger	2009	(France) Renaud Derlot	2009	(United Kingdom) Tim Bridgman	2009	(Sweden) Jocke Mangs	2009	(Italy) Alessandro Balzan	Not Held	
2010	(France) Nicolas Armindo	2010	(France) Frédéric Makowiecki	2010	(United Kingdom) Tim Harvey	2010	(Sweden) Robin Rudholm	2010	(Italy) Alessandro Balzan	Not Held	
2011	(United Kingdom) Nick Tandy	2011	(France) Kévin Estre	2011	(United Kingdom) James Sutton	2011	(Sweden) Robin Rudholm	2011	(Italy) Alessandro Balzan	Not Held	
2012	(Germany) René Rast	2012	(France) Jean-Karl Vernay	2012	(United Kingdom) Michael Meadows	2012	(Sweden) Johan Kristoffersson	2012	(Italy) Vito Postiglione	Not Held	
2013	(France) Kévin Estre	2013	(France) Gaël Castelli	2013	(United Kingdom) Michael Meadows	2013	(Sweden) Johan Kristoffersson	2013	(Italy) Enrico Fulgenzi	2013	(Belgium) Jeffrey van Hooydonk
2014	(Austria) Philipp Eng	2014	(France) Côme Ledogar	2014	(United Kingdom) Josh Webster	2014	(Sweden) Oscar Palm	2014	(Italy) Matteo Cairoli	2014	(Netherlands) Xavier Maassen
2015	(Austria) Philipp Eng	2015	(France) Maxime Jousse	2015	(United Kingdom) Dan Cammish	2015	(Sweden) Johan Kristoffersson	2015	(Italy) Riccardo Agostini	2015	(Netherlands) Peter Hoevenaars
2016	(Germany) Sven Müller	2016	(France) Mathieu Jaminet	2016	(United Kingdom) Dan Cammish	2016	(Sweden) Fredrik Larsson	2016	(France) Côme Ledogar	2016	(Belgium) Dylan Derdaele
2017	(Norway) Dennis Olsen	2017	(France) Julien Andlauer	2017	(Republic of Ireland) Charlie Eastwood	2017	(Sweden) Jocke Mangs	2017	(Italy) Alessio Rovera	2017	(Netherlands) Xavier Maassen
2018	(Austria) Thomas Preining	2018	(Turkey) Ayhancan Güven	2018	(Cyprus) Tio Ellinas	2018	(Sweden) Lukas Sundahl	2018	(Italy) Gianmarco Quaresmini	2018	(Turkey) Ayhancan Güven
2019	(France) Julien Andlauer	2019	(Turkey) Ayhancan Güven	2019	(United Kingdom) Daniel Harper	2019	(Sweden) Lukas Sundahl	2019	(Italy) Simone Iaquinta	2019	(Netherlands) Max van Splunteren
2020	(Netherlands) Larry ten Voorde	2020	(New Zealand) Jaxon Evans	2020	(United Kingdom) Harry King	2020	(Sweden) Lukas Sundahl	2020	(Italy) Simone Iaquinta	2020	(Netherlands) Loek Hartog
2021	(Netherlands) Larry ten Voorde	2021	(France) Marvin Klein	2021	(United Kingdom) Dan Cammish	2021	(Sweden) Lukas Sundahl	2021	(Italy) Alberto Cerqui	2021	(Belgium) Dylan Derdaele
2022	(Germany) Laurin Heinrich	2022	(France) Marvin Klein	2022	(United Kingdom) Kiern Jewiss	2022	(Sweden) Lukas Sundahl	2022	(Italy) Gianmarco Quaresmini	2022	(United Kingdom) Harry King
2023	(Netherlands) Larry ten Voorde	2023	(France) Dorian Boccolacci	2023	(United Kingdom) Adam Smalley	2023	(Sweden) Ola Nilsson	2023	(Netherlands) Larry ten Voorde	2023	(Netherlands) Robert de Haan
2024	(Netherlands) Larry ten Voorde	2024	(France) Alessandro Ghiretti	2024	(United Kingdom) George Gamble	2024	(Sweden) Lukas Sundahl	2024	(South Africa) Keagan Masters	2024	(Netherlands) Dirk Schouten
2025	(Netherlands) Robert de Haan	2025	(France) Marcus Amand	2025	(South Africa) Andrew Rackstraw	2025	(Sweden) Daniel Ros	2025	(South Africa) Keagan Masters	2025	(Netherlands) Jaap van Lagen
2026	(South Africa) Keagan Masters	2026	(France) Marvin Klein	2026	(United Kingdom) Callum Voisin	2026	(Sweden) William Siverholm	2026	(Italy) Andrea Bristot	2026	(Poland) Milan Marczak
Season	Driver	Season	Driver	Season	Driver	Season	Driver	Season	Driver	Season	Driver
Carrera Cup Germany		Carrera Cup France		Carrera Cup Great Britain		Carrera Cup Scandinavia		Carrera Cup Italia		Carrera Cup Benelux	

=== Rest of the world ===
Mobil 1 Supercup		Carrera Cup Japan		Carrera Cup Asia		Carrera Cup Australia		Carrera Cup Brasil		Carrera Cup North America		Carrera Cup Middle East	
Season	Driver	Season	Driver	Season	Driver	Season	Driver	Season	Driver	Season	Driver	Season	Driver
1993	(Germany) Altfrid Heger	Not Held		Not Held		Not Held		Not Held		Not Held		Not Held	
1994	(Germany) Uwe Alzen	Not Held		Not Held		Not Held		Not Held		Not Held		Not Held	
1995	(France) Jean-Pierre Malcher	Not Held		Not Held		Not Held		Not Held		Not Held		Not Held	
1996	(France) Emmanuel Collard	Not Held		Not Held		Not Held		Not Held		Not Held		Not Held	
1997	(Netherlands) Patrick Huisman	Not Held		Not Held		Not Held		Not Held		Not Held		Not Held	
1998	(Netherlands) Patrick Huisman	Not Held		Not Held		Not Held		Not Held		Not Held		Not Held	
1999	(Netherlands) Patrick Huisman	Not Held		Not Held		Not Held		Not Held		Not Held		Not Held	
2000	(Netherlands) Patrick Huisman	Not Held		Not Held		Not Held		Not Held		Not Held		Not Held	
2001	(Germany) Jörg Bergmeister	2001	(Japan) Yasuo Miyakawa	Not Held		Not Held		Not Held		Not Held		Not Held	
2002	(Monaco) Stéphane Ortelli	2002	(Japan) Takashi Inoue	Not Held		Not Held		Not Held		Not Held		Not Held	
2003	(Germany) Frank Stippler	2003	(Japan) Masayuki Yamamoto	2003	(Hong Kong) Charles Kwan	2003	(New Zealand) Jim Richards	Not Held		Not Held		Not Held	
2004	(Germany) Wolf Henzler	2004	(Japan) Masayuki Yamamoto	2004	(Hong Kong) Matthew Marsh	2004	(Australia) Alex Davison	Not Held		Not Held		Not Held	
2005	(Italy) Alessandro Zampedri	2005	(Japan) Isao Ihashi	2005	(United Kingdom) Jonathan Cocker	2005	(New Zealand) Fabian Coulthard	2005	(Brazil) Beto Posses	Not Held		Not Held	
2006	(United Kingdom) Richard Westbrook	2006	(Japan) Isao Ihashi	2006	(Hong Kong) Darryl O'Young	2006	(New Zealand) Craig Baird	2006	(Brazil) Xandy Negrão	Not Held		Not Held	
2007	(United Kingdom) Richard Westbrook	2007	(Japan) Shinichi Takagi	2007	(United Kingdom) Tim Sugden	2007	(Australia) David Reynolds	2007	(Brazil) Ricardo Baptista	Not Held		Not Held	
2008	(Netherlands) Jeroen Bleekemolen	2008	(Japan) Akihiro Tsuzuki	2008	(Hong Kong) Darryl O'Young	2008	(New Zealand) Craig Baird	2008	(Brazil) Miguel Paludo	Not Held		Not Held	
2009	(Netherlands) Jeroen Bleekemolen	2009	(Japan) Yasuhiro Shimizu	2009	(Germany) Christian Menzel	Not Held		2009	(Brazil) Miguel Paludo	Not Held		Not Held	
2010	(Germany) René Rast	2010	(Japan) Yasuhiro Shimizu	2010	(Germany) Christian Menzel	Not Held		2010	(Brazil) Ricardo Rosset	Not Held		Not Held	
2011	(Germany) René Rast	2011	(Japan) Hideto Yasuoka	2011	(Japan) Keita Sawa	2011	(New Zealand) Craig Baird	2011	(Brazil) Constantino Júnior	Not Held		Not Held	
2012	(Germany) René Rast	2012	(Japan) Ryo Hirakawa	2012	(Switzerland) Alexandre Imperatori	2012	(New Zealand) Craig Baird	2012	(Brazil) Ricardo Baptista	Not Held		Not Held	
2013	(Denmark) Nicki Thiim	2013	(Japan) Ryo Ogawa	2013	(New Zealand) Earl Bamber	2013	(New Zealand) Craig Baird	2013	(Brazil) Ricardo Rosset	Not Held		Not Held	
2014	(New Zealand) Earl Bamber	2014	(Japan) Ryo Ogawa	2014	(New Zealand) Earl Bamber	2014	(New Zealand) Steven Richards	2014	(Brazil) Constantino Júnior	Not Held		Not Held	
2015	(Austria) Philipp Eng	2015	(Japan) Yuya Motojima	2015	(New Zealand) Chris van der Drift	2015	(Australia) Nick Foster	2015	(Brazil) Ricardo Rosset	Not Held		Not Held	
2016	(Germany) Sven Müller	2016	(Japan) Tsubasa Kondo	2016	(Germany) Nico Menzel	2016	(Australia) Matt Campbell	2016	(Brazil) Lico Kaesemodel	Not Held		Not Held	
2017	(Germany) Michael Ammermüller	2017	(Japan) Shinji Takei	2017	(New Zealand) Chris van der Drift	2017	(Australia) David Wall	2017	(Brazil) Rodrigo Baptista	Not Held		Not Held	
2018	(Germany) Michael Ammermüller	2018	(Japan) Tsubasa Kondo	2018	(New Zealand) Chris van der Drift	2018	(New Zealand) Jaxon Evans	2018	(Brazil) Werner Neugebauer	Not Held		Not Held	
2019	(Germany) Michael Ammermüller	2019	(Japan) Ukyo Sasahara	2019	(Germany) Philip Hamprecht	2019	(Australia) Jordan Love	2019	(Brazil) Marçal Müller	Not Held		Not Held	
2020	(Netherlands) Larry ten Voorde	2020	(Japan) Tsubasa Kondo	2020	Not Held	2020	Not Awarded	2020	(Brazil) Miguel Paludo	Not Held		Not Held	
2021	(Netherlands) Larry ten Voorde	2021	(Japan) Tsubasa Kondo	2021	(China) Lu Wenlong	2021	(Australia) Cameron Hill	2021	(Brazil) Miguel Paludo	2021	(Guernsey) Sebastian Priaulx	Not Held	
2022	(Luxembourg) Dylan Pereira	2022	(Japan) Ryo Ogawa	2022	(China) Leo Ye Hongli	2022	(Australia) Harri Jones	2022	(Brazil) Enzo Elias	2022	(Canada) Parker Thompson	Not Held	
2023	(Denmark) Bastian Buus	2023	(Japan) Ryo Ogawa	2023	(France) Florian Latorre	2023	(New Zealand) Callum Hedge	2023	(Brazil) Nicolas Costa	2023	(United States) Riley Dickinson	2023–24	(Germany) Theo Oeverhaus
2024	(Netherlands) Larry ten Voorde	2024	(Japan) Reimei Ito	2024	(France) Alessandro Ghiretti	2024	(Australia) Harri Jones	2024	(Brazil) Marçal Müller	2024	(Netherlands) Loek Hartog	2024–25	(Germany) Janne Stiak
2025	(France) Alessandro Ghiretti	2025	(Japan) Iori Kimura	2025	(Luxembourg) Dylan Pereira	2025	(Australia) Dylan O'Keeffe	2025	(Brazil) Miguel Paludo	2025	(New Zealand) Ryan Yardley	2025–26	(Japan) Taichi Watarai
2026	(Netherlands) Flynt Schuring	2026	(Japan) Taichi Watarai	2026	(New Zealand) Marco Giltrap	2026	(Australia) Harri Jones	2026	(Brazil)	2026	(United States) Tyler Maxson	2026–27	
Season	Driver	Season	Driver	Season	Driver	Season	Driver	Season	Driver	Season	Driver	Season	Driver
Mobil 1 Supercup		Carrera Cup Japan		Carrera Cup Asia		Carrera Cup Australia		Carrera Cup Brasil		Carrera Cup North America		Carrera Cup Middle East	

== See also ==
- Ferrari Challenge
- Lamborghini Super Trofeo
- Mustang Challenge
- Audi R8 LMS Cup
- Trofeo Maserati
