= Hampus Ericsson =

Swedish racing driver

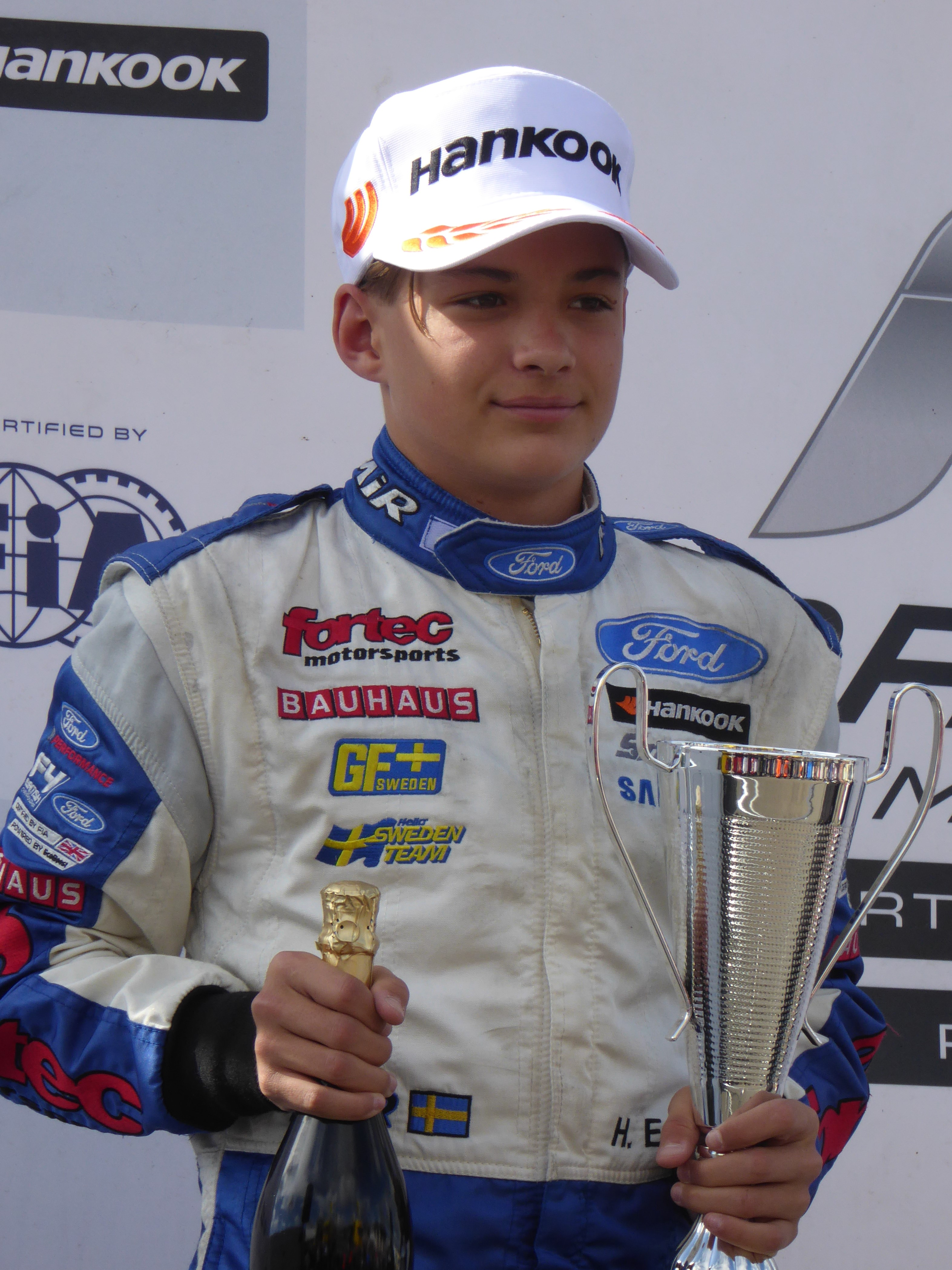
- Ericsson in 2017
- Nationality: (Sweden) Swedish
- Born: 14 March 2003 (age 23) Kumla, Sweden
- Relatives: Marcus Ericsson (brother)

Porsche Carrera Cup Scandinavia career
- Debut season: 2019
- Current team: M3G Motorsport
- Categorisation: FIA Silver
- Former teams: Mtec Competition, Fragus Motorsport
- Starts: 47 (47 entries)
- Wins: 6
- Podiums: 28
- Poles: 4
- Fastest laps: 11
- Best finish: 2nd in 2021

Hampus Ericsson (born 14 March 2003) is a Swedish racing driver who currently competes in the Lamborghini Super Trofeo North America for Wayne Taylor Racing. He is the younger brother of former Formula One driver and current IndyCar Series driver, Marcus Ericsson.

== Early career ==
=== Karting ===
The youngest brother of former Formula One driver and 2022 Indianapolis 500 winner Marcus Ericsson, he began karting at the age of seven. He spent the majority of his karting career with Ward Racing and competed in the CIK-FIA World Championship and the CIK-FIA Karting European Championship multiple times. In 2016, he came runner-up to the Swedish Championship in the KF Junior category.

=== Formula 4 ===
==== 2017 ====
Ericsson stepped up to Formula 4 machinery in the 2017 F4 British Championship for Fortec Motorsports where he only partook in select rounds as a part of the Challenge Cup. At his debut round in the second round of the series at Donington Park, he came ninth, tenth and eleventh in the races. He didn't race until the fifth round of the series at Croft Circuit, where he came eleventh, ninth and eleventh in the three races.

In the sixth round at Snetterton Circuit, Ericsson had a collision in race 1 with Karl Massaard which brought out the safety car. Post-race the collision was deemed avoidable and Ericsson was excluded from the next race. He came in his highest position yet in the third place, coming in sixth. His next round at Knockhill was his best, coming seventh in the first race, starting on reverse-pole in his second race, which he converted to a third place, his maiden podium, and finished tenth in the third race. At Rockingham Motor Speedway, he came tenth, sixth and sixth again in the three races and at the penultimate round of the series at Silverstone Circuit, he came ninth, fourth and fifteenth. In the final round of the series at Brands Hatch, he struggled with a thirteenth and a twelfth in the first two races but get his second podium – another third place, at the final race. Ericsson won the Ford F4 Challenge Cup with his prize being a free entry in the 2018 F4 British Championship. He also finished the overall championship in tenth with 69 points.

==== 2018 ====
Ericsson continued with Fortec Motorsports for the 2018 F4 British Championship but had a challenging season, only managing a best finish of fourth and the third race of Oulton Park. He ended his Formula 4 campaign early after the halfway point of the series at Rockingham Motor Speedway, where he switched to the 2018 BRDC British Formula 3 Championship for the rest of the year. Ericsson finished the championship in 11th with 54 points.

=== BRDC British Formula 3 Championship ===
==== 2018 ====
With Fortec Motorsports, Ericsson raced in the final two rounds of the season at Donington Park and Brands Hatch. He got his maiden Formula 3 level podium in the second race of his debut round at Donington Park. Ericsson came eighth and ninth in the next two races at Silverstone Circuit and finished the championship in 21st with 64 points.

==== 2019 ====
Ericsson contested the 2019 BRDC British Formula 3 Championship full-time with Double R Racing. He took his maiden car racing win at the third race of the second round at Snetterton Circuit. Ericsson had a consistent season and finished in the top-ten on a frequent basis, ending the championship in tenth with 284 points. During the season, he made a cameo in the Porsche Carrera Cup Scandinavia.

== GT3 career ==
=== Porsche competition ===
==== 2020 ====
After his cameo in a round of the 2019 Porsche Carrera Cup Scandinavia that included 1997 Formula One World Champion Jacques Villeneuve and Prince Carl Philip, Duke of Värmland, Ericsson moved away from single-seaters and into GT3 racing in the form of the Porsche Carrera Cup Scandinavia for the 2020 season.

Ericsson joined the Porsche Carrera Cup Scandinavia Driver Development Programme and raced for Mtech Competition, where he achieved one podium throughout the season at Karlskoga Motorstadion. He finished 5th in the championship with 133 points.

==== 2021 ====
Ericsson would switch to Fragus Motorsport for the 2021 season. He got his first two podiums on the season at Anderstorp Raceway and got his first win in the second race of the third round at Falkenbergs Motorbana. He continued his winning streak by winning both races at Karlskoga Motorstadion, where he also got his maiden pole position in racing in the first race. At Rudskogen, the only round not held in Sweden with the track being located in Norway, Ericsson's winning streak was broken but he still got a podium in all three races. The final round of the season was at Mantorp Park, where Ericsson ended the year with another podium. He finished the season runner-up to the title with three wins, one pole position, two fastest laps, nine podiums and 237 points. At the season's end he was selected to take part in the Porsche Motorsport Junior Programme Shoot-out.

==== 2022 ====
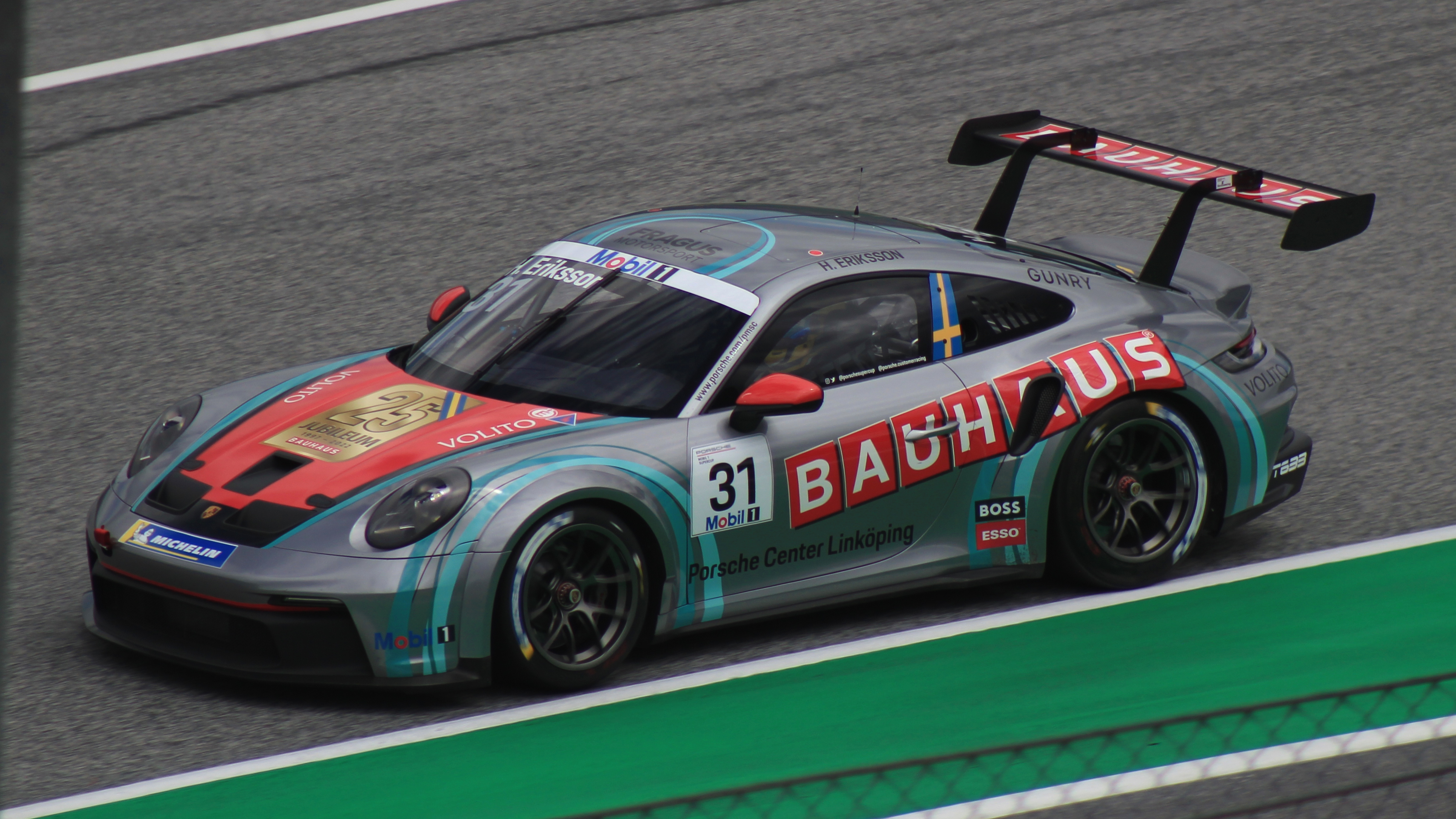
Ericsson at the Red Bull Ring in 2022

Ericsson would continue with Fragus Motorsport for the 2022 Porsche Carrera Cup Scandinavia and come second in the first two races of the first round at Anderstorp Raceway. At the next round in Drivecenter Arena, he only got one second place at the second race. In the third and fourth rounds at Anderstorp Raceway and Karlskoga Motorstadion he got one third place in each round. At the penultimate round in Rudskogen he came fourth, third and second in the three races. Ericsson finished third in the both races of the final round at Mantorp Park, as he ended the championship in fourth with nine podiums and 214 points.

Ericsson also competed in two rounds of the 2022 Porsche Supercup with Fragus Motorsport, at the first round in Imola Circuit he would come in 20th. He came 18th in his second appearance at the Red Bull Ring.

==== 2023 ====
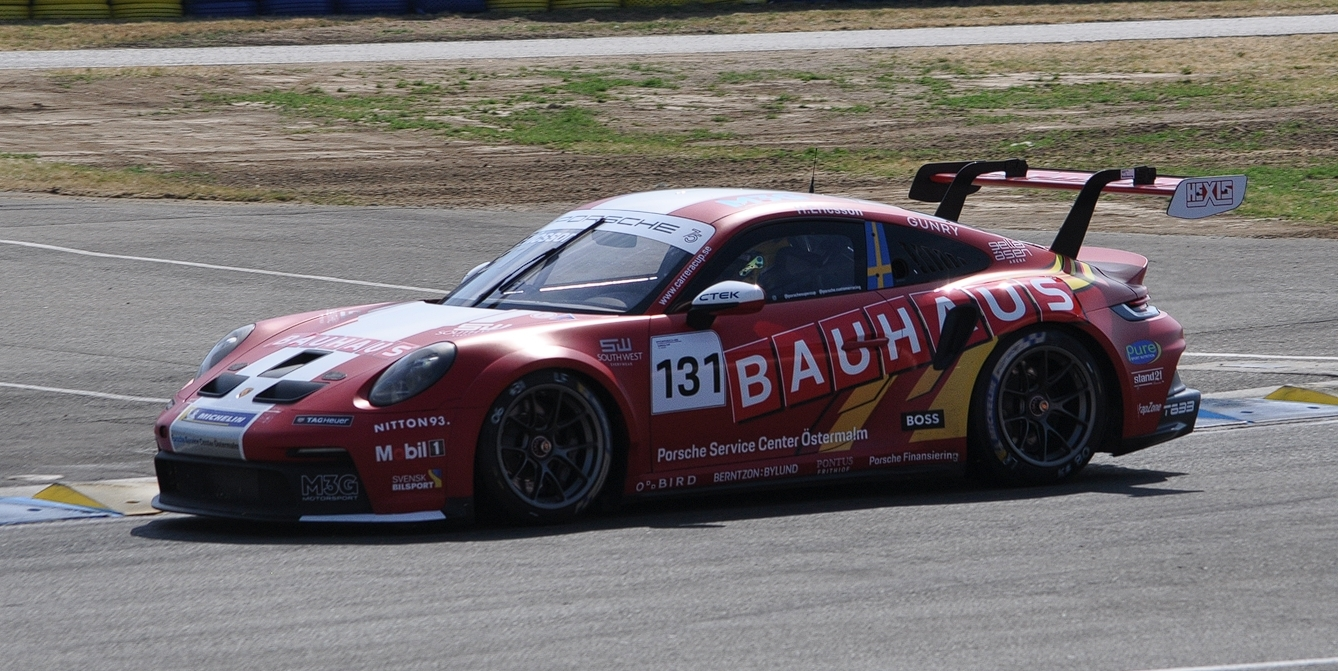
Ericsson at Circuit de la Sarthe in 2023

Ericsson moved to M3G Motorsport for the 2023 Porsche Carrera Cup Scandinavia, which saw immediate results as he won the opening race at Anderstorp Raceway with a fastest lap and pole position and finished third in the second race. After a difficult race at the Circuit de la Sarthe where he came in fourteenth, he was back on form at Drivecenter Arena, clinching a win. Ericsson would finish twice in the next round also held at Drivecenter Arena. He would come, fourth, fifth and fourth in the three races of the penultimate round at Rudskogen and second in the two races of the final round at Mantorp Park. Ericsson finished the championship in third place with three wins, two pole positions, eight fastest laps, nine podiums and 257 points. Similar to 2021, he was selected to take part in the Porsche Motorsport Junior Programme Shoot-out at the end of the year.

=== Lamborghini competition ===
==== 2024 ====
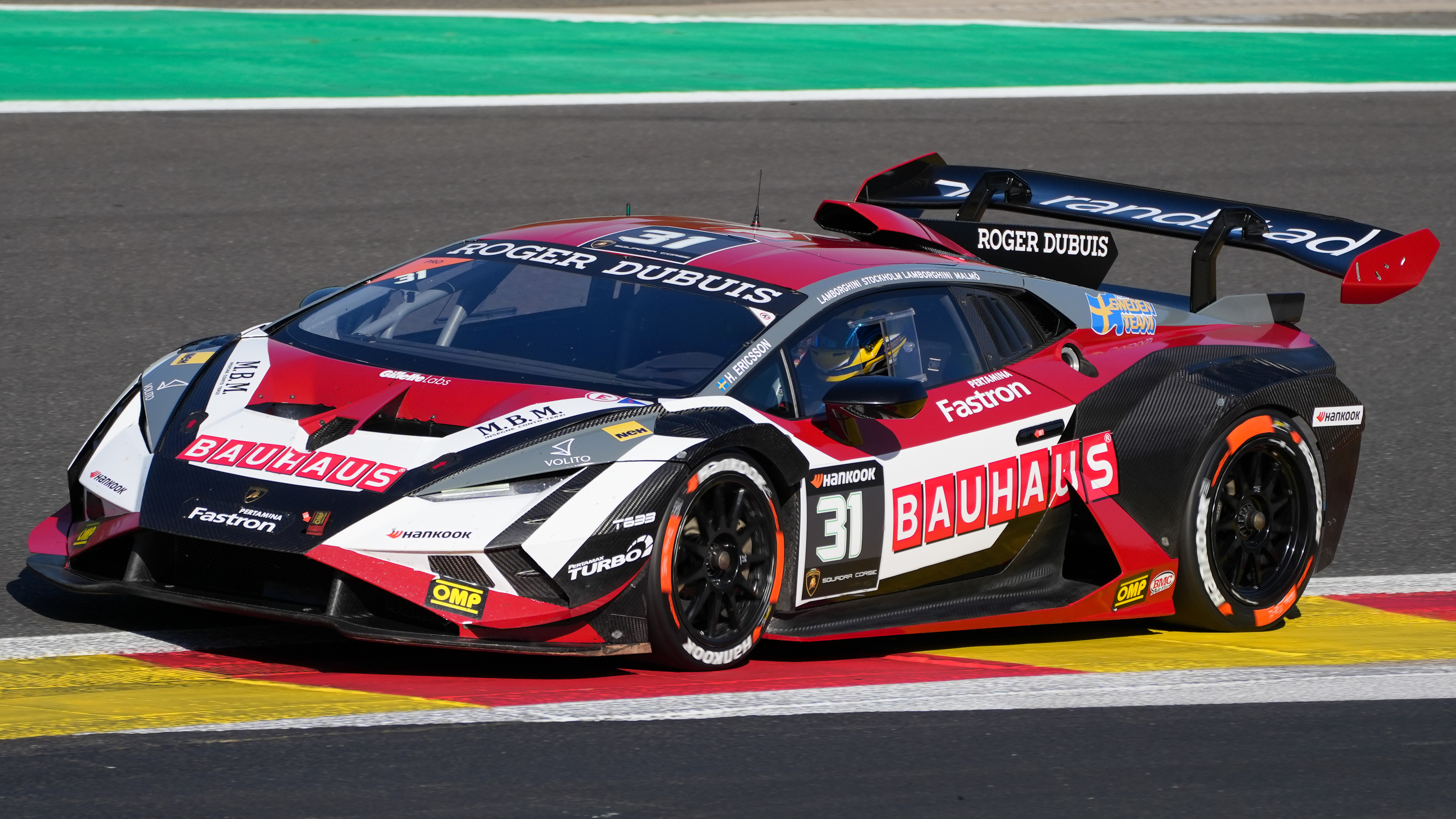
Ericsson at Circuit de Spa-Francorchamps in 2024

Ericsson switched from Porsche one-make racing to Lamborghini one-make racing from 2024, entering the 2024 Lamborghini Super Trofeo Europe with Italian outfit Target Racing as a solo entry. He claimed his only podium on the season in the first race of the second round at Circuit de Spa-Francorchamps and ended the championship in fifth with 53 points. During this time he became a Lamborghini Junior Driver. At the Lamborghini Super Trofeo World Final at Circuito de Jerez, Ericsson would win the first race after Danny Formal and Amaury Bonduel collided. He came runner-up to the title, losing to Egor Orudzhev.

Ericsson made a cameo in the Radical Cup Scandinavia at Ring Knutstorp, winning the first two races and coming second in the third race.

==== 2025 ====
Ericsson moved to the United States to compete in the 2025 Lamborghini Super Trofeo North America for Wayne Taylor Racing alongside Danny Formal.

== Karting record ==
=== Karting career summary ===
Season	Series	Team	Position
2011	MKR series Sweden - Formula Micro	SMK Örebro	43rd
2012	Göteborgs Stora Pris - Junior 60		13th
2012	Swedish Championship - Junior 60		22nd
2013	Göteborgs Stora Pris - Junior 60		12th
2013	Swedish Championship - Junior 60	Ward Racing	21st
2014	Göteborgs Stora Pris - Junior 60		4th
2014	Swedish Championship - Junior 60	Ward Racing	3rd
2015	Göteborgs Stora Pris - KF3		20th
2015	WSK Final Cup - KFJ	Ward Racing	8th
2015	WSK Gold Clip - KF Junior	Ward Racing	
2015	Swedish Championship - KF Junior	Ward Racing	15th
2015	CIK-FIA Karting European Championship - KF Junior	Ward Racing	55th
2015	CIK-FIA World Championship - KF Junior	Ward Racing	
2016	South Garda Winter Cup - OK Junior	Ward Racing	
2016	CIK-FIA European Championship - OK Junior	Ward Racing	25th
2016	Andrea Margutti Trophy - OK Junior	Ward Racing	6th
2016	WSK Final Cup - OKJ	Ward Racing	11th
2016	CIK-FIA World Junior Championship - OK Junior	Ward Racing	26th
2016	Swedish Championship - KF Junior	Ward Racing	2nd
2016	Trofeo delle Industrie - OKJ		4th

== Racing record ==
=== Racing career summary ===
Season	Series	Team	Races	Wins	Poles	F/Laps	Podiums	Points	Position
2017	F4 British Championship	Fortec Motorsports	20	0	0	0	2	69	10th
2018	F4 British Championship	Fortec Motorsports	19	0	0	0	0	54	11th
2018	BRDC British Formula 3 Championship	Fortec Motorsports	5	0	0	0	1	64	21st
2019	BRDC British Formula 3 Championship	Double R Racing	24	1	0	1	1	284	10th
2019	Porsche Carrera Cup Scandinavia	Mtech Competition	2	0	0	0	0	0	NC†
2020	Porsche Carrera Cup Scandinavia	Mtech Competition	14	0	1	1	1	133	5th
2021	Porsche Carrera Cup Scandinavia	Fragus Motorsport	14	3	1	2	9	237	**2nd**
2022	Porsche Carrera Cup Scandinavia	Fragus Motorsport	13	0	0	0	9	214	4th
2022	Porsche Supercup	Fragus Motorsport	2	0	0	0	0	0	NC†
2023	Porsche Carrera Cup Scandinavia	M3G Motorsport	14	3	2	8	9	257	**3rd**
2024	Lamborghini Super Trofeo Europe	Target Racing	11	0	0	0	1	53	5th
2024	Radical Cup Scandinavia	RCR Sweden	3	2	2	3	3	92	16th
2024	Lamborghini Super Trofeo World Final - Pro		2	1	0	1	1	23	**2nd**
2025	Lamborghini Super Trofeo North America - Pro	Wayne Taylor Racing	2	2	1	2	2	*	*
2025	Lamborghini Super Trofeo Asia - Pro	Leipert Motorsport	2	0	1	1	1	21	11th
2025-26	24H Series Middle East - GT3	Leipert Motorsport							
2026	Lamborghini Super Trofeo North America - Pro	Wayne Taylor Racing	12	2	1	2	8	116	**3rd**
2026	GT World Challenge America - Pro-Am	Random Vandals Racing	7	0	0	0	0	30	12th

† As Ericsson was a guest driver, he was ineligible for points.

=== Complete F4 British Championship results ===
(key) (Races in bold indicate pole position) (Races in italics indicate fastest lap)

Year	Team	1	2	3	4	5	6	7	8	9	10	11	12	13	14	15	16	17	18	19	20	21	22	23	24	25	26	27	28	29	30	31	Pos	Points
2017	Fortec Motorsports	BRI; 1	BRI; 2	BRI; 3	DON; 1; 9	DON; 2; 10	DON; 3; 11	THR; 1	THR; 2	THR; 3	OUL; 1	OUL; 2	OUL; 3	CRO; 1; 11	CRO; 2; 9	CRO; 3; 11	SNE; 1; 12	SNE; 2 EX	SNE; 3; 6	KNO; 1; 7	KNO; 2	KNO; 3; 3	KNO; 4; 10	ROC; 1; 10	ROC; 2; 6	ROC; 3; 6	SIL; 1; 9	SIL; 2; 4	SIL; 3; 15	BHGP; 1; 12	BHGP; 2; 13	BHGP; 3; 3	10th	69
2018	Fortec Motorsports	BRI; 1; 13	BRI; 2; 10	BRI; 3; 6	DON; 1; 5	DON; 2 Ret	DON; 3 Ret	THR; 1; 11	THR; 2; 10	THR; 3; 8	OUL; 1; 7	OUL; 2; 13	OUL; 3; 4	CRO; 1; 9	CRO; 2; 8	CRO; 3 Ret	SNE; 1 DNS	SNE; 2 DNS	SNE; 3 Ret	ROC; 1; 14	ROC; 2 Ret	ROC; 3; 7	KNO; 1	KNO; 2	KNO; 3	SIL; 1	SIL; 2	SIL; 3	BHGP; 1	BHGP; 2	BHGP; 3		11th	54

=== Complete BRDC British Formula 3 Championship results ===
(key) (Races in bold indicate pole position) (Races in italics indicate fastest lap)

Year	Team	1	2	3	4	5	6	7	8	9	10	11	12	13	14	15	16	17	18	19	20	21	22	23	24	Pos	Points
2018	Fortec Motorsports	OUL; 1	OUL; 2	OUL; 3	ROC; 1	ROC; 2	ROC; 3	SNE; 1	SNE; 2	SNE; 3	SIL; 1	SIL; 2	SIL; 3	SPA; 1	SPA; 2	SPA; 3	BRH; 1	BRH; 2	BRH; 3	DON; 1; 13	DON; 2; 3^{2}	DON; 3; 5	SIL; 1; 8	SIL; 2; 9	SIL; 3 C	21st	64
2019	Double R Racing	OUL; 1; 6	OUL; 2; 14	OUL; 3; 13	SNE; 1; 4	SNE; 2; 7^{6}	SNE; 3; 1	SIL1; 1; 14	SIL1; 2 Ret	SIL1; 3; 9	DON1; 1; 8	DON1; 2; 6^{1}	DON1; 3; 8	SPA; 1; 6	SPA; 2; 14	SPA; 3; 4	BRH; 1; 12	BRH; 2; 5	BRH; 3; 10	SIL2; 1; 9	SIL2; 2 Ret	SIL2; 3; 6	DON2; 1; 10	DON2; 2; 10	DON2; 3; 9	10th	284

=== Complete Porsche Carrera Cup Scandinavia results ===
(key) (Races in bold indicate pole position) (Races in italics indicate fastest lap)

Year	Team	1	2	3	4	5	6	7	8	9	10	11	12	13	14	DC	Points
2020	Mtech Competition	FAL; 1; 6	FAL; 2; 11	SKE; 1; 5	SKE; 2; 7	KAR; 1; 4	KAR; 2; 3	AND; 1; 11	AND; 2; 6	**AND**; **3**; 6	MAN; 1; 4	MAN; 2; 6	MAN; 3 Ret	KNU; 1; 7	KNU; 2; 8	5th	170
2021	Fragus Motorsport	KNU; 1; 6	KNU; 2; 6	AND; 1; 3	AND; 2; 8	AND; 3; 3	FAL; 1; 4	FAL; 2; 1	**KAR**; **1**; 1	KAR; 2; 1	RUD; 1; 3	RUD; 2; 3	RUD; 3; 2	MAN; 1; 3	MAN; 2; 6	2nd	237
2022	Fragus Motorsport	AND1; 1; 2	AND1; 2; 2	SKE; 1 Ret	SKE; 2; 2	SKE; 3; 7	AND2; 1; 3	AND2; 2; 5	KAR; 1; 4	KAR; 2; 3	RUD; 1; 4	RUD; 2; 3	RUD; 3; 2	MAN; 1; 3	MAN; 2; 3	4th	214
2023	M3G Motorsport	**AND1**; **1**; 1	AND1; 2; 3	LMS; 1; 14	SKE1; 1; 1	SKE1; 2; 5	SKE2; 1; 2	SKE2; 2; 2	**KAR**; **1**; 1	KAR; 2; 2	RUD; 1; 4	RUD; 2; 5	RUD; 3; 4	MAN; 1; 2	MAN; 2; 2	3rd	257

^{†} As Ericsson was a guest driver, he was ineligible to score points.
