= 2010 Porsche Carrera Cup Asia =

Motorsport racing season

The 2010 Porsche Carrera Cup Asia was the eighth season of the Porsche Carrera Cup Asia. The season commenced on April 16 at the Shanghai International Circuit and finished at the Zhuhai International Circuit on November 7.

Christian Menzel successfully defended his championship with a largely dominant campaign. Singaporean driver Weng Mok Sun was equally dominant in the B-Class championship, securing the title with one round to spare.

== Calendar ==
The following venues hosted at least one round of the 2010 championship.

Round	Circuit	Date	Supporting
1	Shanghai International Circuit, Shanghai, China	16–18 April	Chinese Grand Prix
2	Goldenport Park Circuit, Beijing, China	22–23 May	Stand-alone event
3	Zhuhai International Circuit, Zhuhai, China	19–20 June	Asian GT Series
4	Marina Bay Street Circuit, Marina Bay, Singapore	24–26 September	Singapore Grand Prix; Formula BMW Pacific
5	Shanghai International Circuit, Shanghai, China	23–24 October	China Touring Car Championship; Volkswagen Scirocco R-Cup China
6	Zhuhai International Circuit, Zhuhai, China	4–7 November	Intercontinental Le Mans Cup; Volkswagen Scirocco R-Cup China

=== Cancelled events ===
- The Korea International Circuit was due to host the fourth round of the championship in late August. However, due to track construction delays, the event was cancelled and replaced with an additional round in Zhuhai as part of the 1000 Km of Zhuhai support package.

== Teams and drivers ==
Team	No.	Driver	Class	Rounds
(Hong Kong) Dyna Ten Motorsports	2	(Hong Kong) Kenneth Lau	B	All
(Hong Kong) Dyna Ten Motorsports	8	(Hong Kong) Michael Choi	B	All
(New Zealand) McElrea Racing	5	(Singapore) Yuey Tan	B	All
(Chinese Taipei) Team Pauian Archiland	7	(Chinese Taipei) Jeffrey Lee	B	All
(Hong Kong) Team Daycraft	12	(Hong Kong) Morris Ku	B	1, 3, 5–6
(Hong Kong) Team Daycraft	12	(Hong Kong) Terence Ku	B	2, 4
(Hong Kong) Modena Motorsports	16	(Hong Kong) Wayne Shen	B	All
(Hong Kong) Modena Motorsports	28	(Hong Kong) John Shen	B	All
(Hong Kong) Alain Li	17	(Hong Kong) Alain Li	B	4
(Hong Kong) OpenRoad Racing	18	(Hong Kong) Marcel Tjia	B	1–5
(Hong Kong) OpenRoad Racing	18	(Denmark) Allan Simonsen		6
(Hong Kong) OpenRoad Racing	21	(Hong Kong) Francis Tjia	B	All
(Hong Kong) OpenRoad Racing	25	(Canada) Christian Chia	B	1–5
(Hong Kong) Team Jebsen	20	(Macau) Rodolfo Ávila		All
(Singapore) Team PCS Racing	32	(New Zealand) Craig Baird		1–5
(Singapore) Team PCS Racing	32	(Hong Kong) Siu Yuk Lung	B	6
(Singapore) Team PCS Racing	33	(Singapore) Weng Mok Sun	B	1–5
Red Bull China Racing	38	(Hong Kong) Marchy Lee		All
(Hong Kong) LKM Racing Team	55	(Hong Kong) Darryl O'Young		1, 4–5
(Hong Kong) LKM Racing Team	55	(Japan) Keita Sawa		2–3, 6
(Canada) Shift2neutral Racing	59	(Canada) Philip Briandet	B	All
(France) Team J2M Racing	64	(France) Jean-Marc Merlin	B	All
(Hong Kong) OMAK	68	(Hong Kong) Mak Hing Tak	B	All
(Hong Kong) Vision Mode SRL	77	(Hong Kong) Jacky Yeung	B	All
(China) Asia Pacific Motorsports	88	(Canada) Ross Lau	B	1
(China) Asia Pacific Motorsports	88	(Hong Kong) Shim Ching	B	2–5
(Hong Kong) Jacob & Co. Racing	98	(Hong Kong) Benny Lim		1
(Hong Kong) Jacob & Co. Racing	98	(Hong Kong) Philip Ma		2–4, 6
(Hong Kong) Jacob & Co. Racing	98	(Chinese Taipei) Max Chen	B	5
(Singapore) Team StarChase	99	(Germany) Christian Menzel		All

Icon	Class
B	B Class
	Guest Starter

== Results ==
Round		Circuit	Pole Position	Overall Winner	B-Class Pole Position	B-Class Winner
1	R1	(China) Shanghai 1	(Germany) Christian Menzel	(Germany) Christian Menzel	(Singapore) Weng Mok Sun	(Singapore) Weng Mok Sun
1	R2	(China) Shanghai 1		(Germany) Christian Menzel		(Singapore) Weng Mok Sun
2	R1	(China) Beijing	(Germany) Christian Menzel	(Germany) Christian Menzel	(Hong Kong) Wayne Shen	(Singapore) Weng Mok Sun
2	R2	(China) Beijing		(Germany) Christian Menzel		(Singapore) Weng Mok Sun
3	R1	(China) Zhuhai 1	(Macau) Rodolfo Ávila	(Hong Kong) Marchy Lee	(Singapore) Weng Mok Sun	(Singapore) Weng Mok Sun
3	R2	(China) Zhuhai 1		(Hong Kong) Marchy Lee		(Singapore) Weng Mok Sun
4	R1	Singapore	(Germany) Christian Menzel	(New Zealand) Craig Baird	(Singapore) Weng Mok Sun	(Singapore) Weng Mok Sun
4	R2	Singapore		(New Zealand) Craig Baird		(Singapore) Weng Mok Sun
5	R1	(China) Shanghai 2	(Germany) Christian Menzel	(Germany) Christian Menzel	(Singapore) Weng Mok Sun	(Singapore) Weng Mok Sun
5	R2	(China) Shanghai 2		(Germany) Christian Menzel		(Singapore) Weng Mok Sun
6	R1	(China) Zhuhai 2	(Germany) Christian Menzel	(Denmark) Allan Simonsen	(Hong Kong) Francis Tjia	(Hong Kong) Francis Tjia
6	R2	(China) Zhuhai 2		(Germany) Christian Menzel		(Hong Kong) Francis Tjia

== Championship standings ==
=== Scoring system ===
Points were awarded to the top fifteen classified drivers in every race, using the following system:

Position	1st	2nd	3rd	4th	5th	6th	7th	8th	9th	10th	11th	12th	13th	14th	15th	Pole
Points	20	18	16	14	12	10	9	8	7	6	5	4	3	2	1	1

=== Overall ===
Pos.	Driver	SHA1 (China)		BEI (China)		ZHU1 (China)		SIN (Singapore)		SHA2 (China)		ZHU2 (China)		Points
Pos.	Driver	R1	R2	R3	R4	R5	R6	R7	R8	R9	R10	R11	R12	Points
1	(Germany) Christian Menzel	1	1	1	1	Ret	3	13	4	1	1	2	1	198
2	(Hong Kong) Marchy Lee	3	Ret	3	DSQ	1	1	3	2	4	4	3	3	168
3	(New Zealand) Craig Baird	4	3	2	2	Ret	4	1	1	5	3			148
4	(Macau) Rodolfo Ávila	5	Ret	4	4	Ret	5	4	5	3	5	6	2	135
5	(Singapore) Weng Mok Sun	6	4	5	5	3	6	5	6	6	6			116
6	(Hong Kong) Darryl O'Young	2	2					2	3	2	2			106
7	(Singapore) Ringo Chong	8	5		12	6	11	6	7	9	7	9	6	91
8	(Hong Kong) Francis Tjia	7	6	8		5	10		9	11	12	4	4	89
9	(Hong Kong) Wayne Shen	10	10		8	7	8	9	11	12	10	5	7	80
10	(Chinese Taipei) Jeffrey Lee	13	11	11	Ret	4	7	10	8	14		7	5	73
11	(France) Jean-Marc Merlin	15	9	6	7	13	13	8	12	7	8	13	8	73
12	(Japan) Keita Sawa			13	3	2	2					4		71
13	(Singapore) Yuey Tan	12	8	9	9	10	12	DNS	14	15	14	8	13	52
14	(Hong Kong) Philip Ma			7	6	10	10	11	15			DNS	DNS	49
15	(Canada) Christian Chia	9	7	10	10	11	15			8	9			49
16	(Hong Kong) John Shen		15	15	13	12	14	11	13			12	9	30
17	(Hong Kong) Michael Choi	11	Ret	12	11	9		Ret				Ret	DNS	21
18	(Hong Kong) Kenneth Lau	Ret				14		15		13	13	11	12	18
19	(Canada) Philip Briandet		14		15						15	10	11	15
20	(Hong Kong) Mak Hing Tak		Ret	14		15		12				14	10	15
21	(Hong Kong) Morris Ku	Ret	13			Ret				10	11	Ret	DNS	14
22	(Chinese Taipei) Max Chen	14	12											6
23	(Hong Kong) Marcel Tjia			Ret	14			14	15					5
24	(Hong Kong) Jacky Yeung				DNS							15	14	3
25	(Hong Kong) Shim Ching				Ret		Ret			Ret				0
26	(Hong Kong) Terence Ku													0
27	(Canada) Ross Lau													0
Guest driver ineligible for points
-	(Denmark) Allan Simonsen											1	Ret	0
Pos.	Driver	R1	R2	R3	R4	R5	R6	R7	R8	R9	R10	R11	R12	Points
Pos.	Driver	SHA1 (China)		BEI (China)		ZHU1 (China)		SIN (Singapore)		SHA2 (China)		ZHU2 (China)		Points

== See also ==
- 2010 Porsche Supercup
- 2010 Porsche Carrera Cup Germany
- 2010 Porsche Carrera Cup Great Britain
