= Porsche Carrera Cup Scandinavia =

Racing championship held in Scandinavia

- Category: One-make racing by Porsche
- Country: Scandinavia
- Inaugural season: 2004
- Constructors: Porsche
- Engine suppliers: Porsche
- Tyre suppliers: Michelin
- Drivers' champion: (Sweden) William Siverholm
- Teams' champion: (Sweden) Fragus Motorsport
- Official website: Carrera Cup Scandinavia

Porsche Carrera Cup Scandinavia is a one make racing championship held in Scandinavian countries with the majority of the races being in Sweden. The cars are currently Porsche 911 GT3 Cup (Type 992) with 4.0 liters, flat-6 naturally aspirated engines that produce 485 bhp (362 kW) and 480 N·m.

Inspired by the success of the Porsche Carrera Cup in France and Germany, the first race in the Scandinavian edition was held on 1 May 2004. Since then it has been one of the support series for the Swedish Touring Car Championship.

Among the competitors are former Speedway World Champion Tony Rickardsson and Prince Carl Philip of Sweden. There has also been a number of famous guest drivers, like Mika Häkkinen, Kenny Bräck and Dennis Hauger.

The series is organised and maintained by Swedish racing team Flash Engineering that took over running of the series in 2005 when the series was close to bankruptcy. In 2009 the series became the biggest Carrera Cup-series in the world with 35 entries. The series is currently shown live on Viasat Motor.

== Circuits ==
- (Finland) Ahvenisto Race Circuit (2004–2005)
- (Finland) Alastaro Circuit (2004–2005, 2014, 2017)
- (Sweden) Anderstorp Raceway (2005–2007, 2015–present)
- (Sweden) Åre Östersund Airport (2012–2013)
- (France) Circuit de la Sarthe (2023)
- (Sweden) Drivecenter Arena (2019–2020, 2022–2023, 2025)
- (Sweden) Falkenbergs Motorbana (2004, 2006–2010, 2013–2017, 2020–2021)
- (Sweden) Göteborg City Race (2008–2011, 2013–2014)
- (Denmark) Jyllands-Ringen (2004–2005, 2010–2011, 2024–present)
- (Sweden) Karlskoga Motorstadion (2004–2006, 2013, 2015–present)
- (Sweden) Mantorp Park (2004–present)
- (Germany) Nürburgring (2018)
- (Germany) Nürburgring Nordschleife (2011)
- (Sweden) Ring Knutstorp (2004–2021)
- (Norway) Rudskogen (2017–2019, 2021–present)
- (Sweden) Skövde Airport (2015–2016)
- (Sweden) Solvalla Stockholm (2012–2013, 2015–2016)
- (Sweden) Sturup Raceway (2007–2008, 2012)
- (Sweden) Tierp Arena (2013)
- (Norway) Vålerbanen (2005–2009)

== Champions ==
Season	Champion	Team Champion
2004	(Sweden) Robin Rudholm	(Sweden) Podium Racing
2005	(Sweden) Fredrik Ros	(Sweden) Podium Racing
2006	(Sweden) Fredrik Ros	(Sweden) Flash Engineering
2007	(Sweden) Edward Sandström	(Sweden) Kristoffersson Motorsport
2008	(Sweden) Jocke Mangs	(Sweden) Xlander Racing
2009	(Sweden) Jocke Mangs	(Sweden) Xlander Racing
2010	(Sweden) Robin Rudholm	(Sweden) IPS Motorsport
2011	(Sweden) Robin Rudholm	(Sweden) Xlander Racing
2012	(Sweden) Johan Kristoffersson	(Sweden) Kristoffersson Motorsport
2013	(Sweden) Johan Kristoffersson	(Sweden) Kristoffersson Motorsport
2014	(Sweden) Oscar Palm	(Sweden) Xlander Racing
2015	(Sweden) Johan Kristoffersson	(Sweden) Kristoffersson Motorsport
2016	(Sweden) Fredrik Larsson	(Sweden) Team Bennys
2017	(Sweden) Jocke Mangs	(Sweden) Team Bennys
2018	(Sweden) Lukas Sundahl	(Sweden) Sundahl Racing
2019	(Sweden) Lukas Sundahl	(Sweden) Sundahl Racing
2020	(Sweden) Lukas Sundahl	(Sweden) Sundahl Racing
2021	(Sweden) Lukas Sundahl	(Sweden) Sundahl-Pampas Racing
2022	(Sweden) Lukas Sundahl	(Sweden) Micke Kågered Racing
2023	(Sweden) Ola Nilsson	(Sweden) Mtech Competition
2024	(Sweden) Lukas Sundahl	(Sweden) Micke Kågered Racing
2025	(Sweden) Daniel Ros	(Sweden) Fragus Motorsport
2026	(Sweden) William Siverholm	(Sweden) Fragus Motorsport
