= 2021 Porsche Carrera Cup Scandinavia =

Motor racing season

Seasons
- ← 2020 2022 →

The 2021 Porsche Carrera Cup Scandinavia was the 18th Porsche Carrera Cup Scandinavia season. It began on 7 May at Ring Knutstorp and ended on 2 October at Mantorp Park. The championship was made up of the Porsche 911 GT3 Cup (Type 991 II).

== Entry list ==
Team	No.	Drivers	Class	Rounds
(Sweden) Sundahl-Pampas Racing	1	(Sweden) Lukas Sundahl		All
(Sweden) Sundahl-Pampas Racing	42	(Sweden) Christoffer Bergström	M	All
(Norway) Jaffa-Hermansen Racing	5	(Norway) Roger Hermansen	M	2, 5
(Norway) Jaffa-Hermansen Racing	51	(Norway) Ole William Nærsnes		5
(Sweden) Mtech Competition	9	(Sweden) Thomas Karlsson	M	1–3, 5–6
(Sweden) Mtech Competition	92	(Sweden) Anton Marklund		1
(Sweden) Prido Racing	10	(Sweden) Krister Andero	M	1–2, 4–6
(Sweden) Fragus Motorsport	11	(Sweden) Pontus Fredericsson		1–3, 6
(Sweden) Fragus Motorsport	21	(Sweden) Kjelle Lejonkrans	M	6
(Sweden) Fragus Motorsport	31	(Sweden) Hampus Ericsson		All
(Sweden) Fragus Motorsport	44	(Sweden) Hampus Hedin		1–2, 4–6
(Sweden) Fragus Motorsport	45	(Sweden) Emil Persson		All
(Germany) Porsche Experience Racing	13	(Sweden) Carl Philip Bernadotte	M	All
(Germany) Porsche Experience Racing	911	(Sweden) Fredrik Ekblom	G	1
(Germany) Porsche Experience Racing	911	(Sweden) Fredrik Ekblom		4
(Germany) Porsche Experience Racing	911	(Denmark) Jan Magnussen		2–3
(Germany) Porsche Experience Racing	911	(Switzerland) Simona de Silvestro		5
(Germany) Porsche Experience Racing	911	(Sweden) Felix Rosenqvist		6
(Sweden) Nova Racing	27	(Sweden) Edvin Hellsten		All
(Sweden) Steber Racing	28	(Sweden) Patrick Rundqvist		1, 3–6
(Sweden) Steber Racing	39	(Sweden) Hugo Andersson		All
(Sweden) R Competition	61	(Sweden) Lars-Bertil Rantzow	M	2, 5–6
(Sweden) TK Competition	62	(Sweden) Tommy Karlsson	M	4–6
(Sweden) Kjellin Motorsports	91	(Sweden) Oscar Löfqvist		4–6
(Norway) Porsche Center Son	991	(Norway) Erlend Juan Olsen		5–6

Icon	Class
M	Masters' Cup
G	Guest

== Results ==
Round		Circuit	Date	Pole position	Fastest lap	Winning driver	Winning team	Masters' Cup Winner
1	R1	(Sweden) Ring Knutstorp	7–8 May	(Sweden) Lukas Sundahl	(Sweden) Lukas Sundahl	(Sweden) Lukas Sundahl	(Sweden) Sundahl-Pampas Racing	(Sweden) Christoffer Bergström
1	R2	(Sweden) Ring Knutstorp	7–8 May	(Sweden) Lukas Sundahl	(Sweden) Lukas Sundahl	(Sweden) Lukas Sundahl	(Sweden) Sundahl-Pampas Racing	(Sweden) Thomas Karlsson
2	R1	(Sweden) Anderstorp Raceway	18–19 June	(Sweden) Lukas Sundahl	(Sweden) Lukas Sundahl	(Sweden) Lukas Sundahl	(Sweden) Sundahl-Pampas Racing	(Sweden) Christoffer Bergström
2	R2	(Sweden) Anderstorp Raceway	18–19 June	(Sweden) Lukas Sundahl	(Sweden) Lukas Sundahl	(Sweden) Lukas Sundahl	(Sweden) Sundahl-Pampas Racing	(Sweden) Lars-Bertil Rantzow
2	R3	(Sweden) Anderstorp Raceway	18–19 June	(Sweden) Lukas Sundahl	(Sweden) Lukas Sundahl	(Sweden) Lukas Sundahl	(Sweden) Sundahl-Pampas Racing	(Sweden) Lars-Bertil Rantzow
3	R1	(Sweden) Falkenbergs Motorbana	9–10 July	(Sweden) Lukas Sundahl	(Sweden) Hampus Ericsson	(Sweden) Edvin Hellsten	(Sweden) Nova Racing	(Sweden) Christoffer Bergström
3	R2	(Sweden) Falkenbergs Motorbana	9–10 July	(Sweden) Lukas Sundahl	(Sweden) Emil Persson	(Sweden) Hampus Ericsson	(Sweden) Fragus Motorsport	(Sweden) Christoffer Bergström
4	R1	(Sweden) Karlskoga Motorstadion	20–21 August	(Sweden) Hampus Ericsson	(Sweden) Lukas Sundahl	(Sweden) Hampus Ericsson	(Sweden) Fragus Motorsport	(Sweden) Thomas Karlsson
4	R2	(Sweden) Karlskoga Motorstadion	20–21 August	(Sweden) Lukas Sundahl	(Sweden) Hampus Ericsson	(Sweden) Hampus Ericsson	(Sweden) Fragus Motorsport	(Sweden) Christoffer Bergström
5	R1	(Norway) Rudskogen	17–18 September	(Sweden) Lukas Sundahl	(Sweden) Lukas Sundahl	(Sweden) Lukas Sundahl	(Sweden) Sundahl-Pampas Racing	(Sweden) Christoffer Bergström
5	R2	(Norway) Rudskogen	17–18 September	(Sweden) Lukas Sundahl	(Sweden) Lukas Sundahl	(Sweden) Lukas Sundahl	(Sweden) Sundahl-Pampas Racing	(Sweden) Lars-Bertil Rantzow
5	R3	(Norway) Rudskogen	17–18 September	(Sweden) Lukas Sundahl	(Switzerland) Simona de Silvestro	(Sweden) Lukas Sundahl	(Sweden) Sundahl-Pampas Racing	(Sweden) Lars-Bertil Rantzow
6	R1	(Sweden) Mantorp Park	1–2 October	(Sweden) Felix Rosenqvist	(Sweden) Lukas Sundahl	(Sweden) Lukas Sundahl	(Sweden) Sundahl-Pampas Racing	(Sweden) Lars-Bertil Rantzow
6	R2	(Sweden) Mantorp Park	1–2 October	(Sweden) Lukas Sundahl	(Sweden) Lukas Sundahl	(Sweden) Lukas Sundahl	(Sweden) Sundahl-Pampas Racing	(Sweden) Lars-Bertil Rantzow

== Championship standings ==
Race format

Race 1 is a 20-minute + 1 lap race being set by the results of Q1. Race 2 is a 30-minute + 1 lap race with 9th and below being set by Q1 results and the top 8 being set by a top-eight shootout in Q2. If there are three races, Q1 sets the grid for Race 1 and Race 2 with Q2 setting the grid for Race 3.

Scoring system

Position	1st	2nd	3rd	4th	5th	6th	7th	8th	9th	10th	11th	12th	13th	14th	15th	Pole	FL
Points	25	20	17	14	12	10	9	8	7	6	5	4	3	2	1	1	1

=== Drivers' Championship ===
Those highlighted in blue are Masters' Cup entries.

Pos.	Driver	KNU (Sweden)		AND (Sweden)			FAL (Sweden)		KAR (Sweden)		RUD (Norway)			MAN (Sweden)		Points
Pos.	Driver	R1	R2	R1	R2	R3	R1	R2	R1	R2	R1	R2	R3	R1	R2	Points
1	(Sweden) Lukas Sundahl	1	1	1	1	1	2	Ret	2	2	1	1	1	1	1	332
2	(Sweden) Hampus Ericsson	6	6	3	8	3	4	1	1	1	3	3	2	3	6	237
3	(Sweden) Edvin Hellsten	4	5	5	6	7	1	6	4	4	2	2	4	5	4	202
4	(Sweden) Emil Persson	5	2	7	2	4	3	2	Ret	3	4	4	3	4	5	201
5	(Sweden) Hugo Andersson	3	3	13	4	9	5	Ret	12	6	6	5	9	17	7	122
6	(Sweden) Christoffer Bergström	9	11	6	5	Ret	6	3	7	7	7	10	14	8	10	112
7	(Sweden) Pontus Fredericsson	2	Ret	2	Ret	2	7	DSQ						Ret	2	89
8	(Sweden) Patrick Rundqvist	10	8				10	5	8	Ret	8	8	6	7	9	84
9	(Sweden) Thomas Karlsson	11	9	11	9	Ret	11	Ret	5	9	10	13	10	9	11	77
10	(Sweden) Carl Philip Bernadotte	12	Ret	10	10	8	9	4	6	11	Ret	15	Ret	11	13	70
11	(Sweden) Lars-Bertil Rantzow			8	3	6					Ret	9	8	6	8	68
12	(Sweden) Hampus Hedin	14	10	9	12	10			9	Ret	13	11	11	12	14	53
13	(Denmark) Jan Magnussen			4	7	5	8	Ret								43
14	(Sweden) Felix Rosenqvist													2	3	38
15	(Sweden) Krister Andero	13	12	12	11	11			11	10	15	16	16	14	17	37
16	(Switzerland) Simona de Silvestro										5	6	5			35
17	(Sweden) Oscar Löfqvist								10	8	12	12	15	10	12	33
18	(Sweden) Fredrik Ekblom (Note: Fredrik Ekblom was ineligible for points at Round 1 but was eligible for points at Round 4.)	7	4						3	5						29
19	(Norway) Ole William Nærsnes										9	7	7			25
20	(Sweden) Anton Marklund	8	7													19
21	(Norway) Roger Hermansen			Ret	DNS	DNS					11	14	12			11
22	(Sweden) Tommy Karlsson								13	12	16	18	17	16	18	7
23	(Norway) Erlend Juan Olsen										14	17	13	15	16	6
24	(Sweden) Kjelle Lejonkrans													13	15	4
Pos.	Driver	R1	R2	R1	R2	R3	R1	R2	R1	R2	R1	R2	R3	R1	R2	Points
Pos.	Driver	KNU (Sweden)		AND (Sweden)			FAL (Sweden)		KAR (Sweden)		RUD (Norway)			MAN (Sweden)		Points

=== Masters' Cup ===
Pos.	Driver	KNU (Sweden)		AND (Sweden)			FAL (Sweden)		KAR (Sweden)		RUD (Norway)			MAN (Sweden)		Points
Pos.	Driver	R1	R2	R1	R2	R3	R1	R2	R1	R2	R1	R2	R3	R1	R2	Points
1	(Sweden) Christoffer Bergström	9	11	6	5	Ret	6	3	7	7	7	10	14	8	10	281
2	(Sweden) Thomas Karlsson	11	9	11	9	Ret	11	Ret	5	9	10	13	10	9	11	229
3	(Sweden) Carl Philip Bernadotte	12	Ret	10	10	8	9	4	6	11	Ret	15	Ret	11	13	182
4	(Sweden) Lars-Bertil Rantzow			8	3	6					Ret	9	8	6	8	170
5	(Sweden) Krister Andero	13	12	12	11	11			11	10	15	16	16	14	17	159
6	(Sweden) Tommy Karlsson								13	12	16	18	17	16	18	73
7	(Norway) Roger Hermansen			Ret	DNS	DNS					11	14	12			48
8	(Sweden) Kjelle Lejonkrans													13	15	24
Pos.	Driver	R1	R2	R1	R2	R3	R1	R2	R1	R2	R1	R2	R3	R1	R2	Points
Pos.	Driver	KNU (Sweden)		AND (Sweden)			FAL (Sweden)		KAR (Sweden)		RUD (Norway)			MAN (Sweden)		Points

=== Teams' Championship ===
Pos.	Team	Points
1	(Sweden) Sundahl-Pampas Racing	591
2	(Sweden) Fragus Motorsport	478
3	(Germany) Porsche Experience Racing	325
4	(Sweden) Mtech Competition	297
5	(Sweden) Steber Racing	206
6	(Sweden) Nova Racing	202
7	(Sweden) R Competition	170
8	(Sweden) Prido Racing	159
9	(Norway) Jaffa-Hermansen Racing	73
10	(Sweden) Kjellin Motorsports	33
11	(Sweden) TK Competition	24
12	(Norway) Porsche Center Son	6
