= 2020 Porsche Carrera Cup Scandinavia =

Annual motorsports season

Seasons
- ← 2019 2021 →

The 2020 Porsche Carrera Cup Scandinavia was the 17th Porsche Carrera Cup Scandinavia season. It began on 17 July at Falkenbergs Motorbana and ended on 10 October at Ring Knutstorp. The championship was made up of the Porsche 911 GT3 Cup (Type 991 II). The season was initially supposed to start on 15 May at Ring Knutstorp and end on 3 October at Mantorp Park. However due to the COVID-19 pandemic, the season was pushed back to the aforementioned date of 17 July.

== Entry list ==
Team	No.	Drivers	Class	Rounds
(Sweden) Sundahl Racing	1	(Sweden) Lukas Sundahl		All
(Sweden) Mtech Competition	9	(Sweden) Thomas Karlsson	M	All
(Sweden) Mtech Competition	13	(Sweden) Carl Philip Bernadotte	M	All
(Sweden) Mtech Competition	21	(Sweden) Magnus Öhman	M	All
(Sweden) Mtech Competition	31	(Sweden) Hampus Ericsson		All
(Sweden) Mtech Competition	911	(Norway) Andreas Mikkelsen	G	1
(Sweden) Mtech Competition	911	(Denmark) Jan Magnussen	G	2
(Sweden) Mtech Competition	911	(Denmark) Christina Nielsen	G	3
(Sweden) Mtech Competition	911	(Norway) Dennis Hauger	G	4, 6
(Sweden) Mtech Competition	911	(Sweden) Tom Blomqvist	G	5
(Sweden) Prido Racing	10	(Sweden) Krister Andero	M	1, 3–5
(Sweden) Fragus Motorsport	11	(Sweden) Pontus Fredricsson		All
(Sweden) Fragus Motorsport	14	(Sweden) Robin Hansson		1–3
(Sweden) Fragus Motorsport	20	(Sweden) Thed Björk	G	1
(Sweden) Fragus Motorsport	20	(Sweden) Johan Kristoffersson	G	2, 5–6
(Sweden) Fragus Motorsport	20	(Sweden) Emil Öhman	G	3
(Sweden) Fragus Motorsport	44	(Sweden) Hampus Hedin		1–4, 6
(Sweden) Fragus Motorsport	45	(Sweden) Emil Persson	G	6
(Sweden) Fragus Motorsport	50	(Sweden) Rasmus Lindh	G	6
(Sweden) MRA Morin Racing Academy	15	(Sweden) Hannes Morin	G	2
(Sweden) Nova Racing	27	(Sweden) Edvin Hellsten		All
(Sweden) Steber Racing	28	(Sweden) Patrick Rundqvist	A	1–3
(Sweden) Steber Racing	28	(Sweden) Patrick Rundqvist		4–6
(Sweden) Steber Racing	39	(Sweden) Hugo Andersson		All
(Sweden) Team Pampas	42	(Sweden) Christoffer Bergström	M	1–3, 5–6

Icon	Class
A	Porsche Approved Cup
M	Masters' Cup
G	Guest

== Results ==
Round		Circuit	Date	Pole position	Fastest lap	Winning driver	Winning team	Porsche Approved Cup Winner	Masters' Cup Winner
1	R1	(Sweden) Falkenbergs Motorbana	17–18 July	(Sweden) Lukas Sundahl	(Sweden) Lukas Sundahl	(Sweden) Lukas Sundahl	(Sweden) Sundahl Racing	(Sweden) Patrick Rundqvist	(Sweden) Carl Philip Bernadotte
1	R2	(Sweden) Falkenbergs Motorbana	17–18 July	(Sweden) Lukas Sundahl	(Sweden) Lukas Sundahl	(Sweden) Lukas Sundahl	(Sweden) Sundahl Racing	(Sweden) Patrick Rundqvist	(Sweden) Magnus Öhman
2	R1	(Sweden) Drivecenter Arena	29 July	(Sweden) Johan Kristoffersson (Note: Johan Kristoffersson claimed the pole position as a guest driver. The bonus point was given to the highest qualified eligible driver – Robin Hansson)	(Sweden) Johan Kristoffersson (Note: Johan Kristoffersson achieved the fastest lap as a guest driver. The bonus point was given to the fastest lap out of the eligible drivers – Robin Hansson)	(Sweden) Johan Kristoffersson	(Sweden) Fragus Motorsport	(Sweden) Patrick Rundqvist	(Sweden) Magnus Öhman
2	R2	(Sweden) Drivecenter Arena	29 July	(Sweden) Robin Hansson	(Sweden) Robin Hansson	(Sweden) Johan Kristoffersson	(Sweden) Fragus Motorsport	(Sweden) Patrick Rundqvist	(Sweden) Thomas Karlsson
3	R1	(Sweden) Karlskoga Motorstadion	14–15 August	(Sweden) Lukas Sundahl	(Sweden) Lukas Sundahl	(Sweden) Lukas Sundahl	(Sweden) Sundahl Racing	(Sweden) Patrick Rundqvist	(Sweden) Christoffer Bergström
3	R2	(Sweden) Karlskoga Motorstadion	14–15 August	(Sweden) Lukas Sundahl	(Sweden) Lukas Sundahl	(Sweden) Lukas Sundahl	(Sweden) Sundahl Racing	(Sweden) Patrick Rundqvist	(Sweden) Christoffer Bergström
4	R1	(Sweden) Anderstorp Raceway	18–19 September	(Sweden) Lukas Sundahl	(Sweden) Lukas Sundahl	(Sweden) Lukas Sundahl	(Sweden) Sundahl Racing	No PAC entries	(Sweden) Krister Andero
4	R2	(Sweden) Anderstorp Raceway	18–19 September	(Sweden) Lukas Sundahl	(Sweden) Hugo Andersson	(Sweden) Hugo Andersson	(Sweden) Steber Racing	No PAC entries	(Sweden) Magnus Öhman
4	R3	(Sweden) Anderstorp Raceway	18–19 September	(Sweden) Hampus Ericsson	(Sweden) Hampus Ericsson	(Sweden) Lukas Sundahl	(Sweden) Sundahl Racing	No PAC entries	(Sweden) Carl Philip Bernadotte
5	R1	(Sweden) Mantorp Park	2–3 October	(Sweden) Tom Blomqvist (Note: Tom Blomqvist claimed the pole position as a guest driver. The bonus point was given to the highest qualified eligible driver – Lukas Sundahl)	(Sweden) Johan Kristoffersson (Note: Johan Kristoffersson achieved the fastest lap as a guest driver. The bonus point was given to the fastest lap out of the eligible drivers – Lukas Sundahl)	(Sweden) Tom Blomqvist	(Sweden) Mtech Competition	No PAC entries	(Sweden) Christoffer Bergström
5	R2	(Sweden) Mantorp Park	2–3 October	(Sweden) Tom Blomqvist	(Sweden) Tom Blomqvist (Note: Tom Blomqvist achieved the fastest lap as a guest driver. The bonus point was given to the fastest lap out of the eligible drivers – Lukas Sundahl)	(Sweden) Tom Blomqvist	(Sweden) Mtech Competition	No PAC entries	(Sweden) Christoffer Bergström
5	R3	(Sweden) Mantorp Park	2–3 October	(Sweden) Johan Kristoffersson (Note: Johan Kristoffersson claimed the pole position as a guest driver. The bonus point was given to the highest qualified eligible driver – Hampus Ericsson)	(Sweden) Johan Kristoffersson (Note: Johan Kristoffersson achieved the fastest lap as a guest driver. The bonus point was not awarded to any driver.)	(Sweden) Johan Kristoffersson	(Sweden) Fragus Motorsport	No PAC entries	(Sweden) Christoffer Bergström
6	R1	(Sweden) Ring Knutstorp	9–10 October	(Sweden) Edvin Hellsten	(Sweden) Johan Kristoffersson (Note: Johan Kristoffersson achieved the fastest lap as a guest driver. The bonus point was given to the fastest lap out of the eligible drivers – Hampus Ericsson)	(Sweden) Johan Kristoffersson	(Sweden) Fragus Motorsport	No PAC entries	(Sweden) Carl Philip Bernadotte
6	R2	(Sweden) Ring Knutstorp	9–10 October	(Norway) Dennis Hauger (Note: Dennis Hauger claimed the pole position as a guest driver. The bonus point was given to the highest qualified eligible driver – Lukas Sundahl)	(Sweden) Lukas Sundahl	(Sweden) Lukas Sundahl	(Sweden) Sundahl Racing	No PAC entries	(Sweden) Thomas Karlsson

== Championship standings ==
Race format

Race 1 is a 20-minute + 1 lap race being set by the results of Q1. Race 2 is a 30-minute + 1 lap race with 9th and below being set by Q1 results and the top 8 being set by a top-eight shootout in Q2. If there are three races, Q1 sets the grid for Race 1 and Race 2 with Q2 setting the grid for Race 3. The bonus point for pole position was not given for Race 2.

Scoring system

Position	1st	2nd	3rd	4th	5th	6th	7th	8th	9th	10th	11th	12th	13th	14th	15th	Pole	FL
Points	25	20	17	14	12	10	9	8	7	6	5	4	3	2	1	1	1

=== Drivers' Championship ===
Those highlighted in green are Porsche Approved Cup entries. Those highlighted in blue are Masters' Cup entries.

Pos.	Driver	FAL (Sweden)		SKE (Sweden)		KAR (Sweden)		AND (Sweden)			MAN (Sweden)			KNU (Sweden)		Points
Pos.	Driver	R1	R2	R1	R2	R1	R2	R1	R2	R3	R1	R2	R3	R1	R2	Points
1	(Sweden) Lukas Sundahl	1	1	3	6	1	1	1	2	1	3	3	3	3	1	334
2	(Sweden) Pontus Fredricsson	2	2	4	3	2	2	6	4	4	13	4	2	4	7	244
3	(Sweden) Edvin Hellsten	4	Ret	6	4	3	4	10	Ret	2	7	7	4	2	5	186
4	(Sweden) Hugo Andersson	8	8	10	14	8	5	2	1	5	6	9	5	11	4	178
5	(Sweden) Hampus Ericsson	6	11	5	7	4	3	11	6	6	4	6	Ret	7	8	170
6	(Sweden) Magnus Öhman	Ret	6	8	9	6	7	5	5	8	10	10	7	10	10	133
7	(Sweden) Thomas Karlsson	Ret	7	9	8	9	Ret	7	9	10	9	11	9	9	9	107
8	(Sweden) Carl Philip Bernadotte	9	9	12	10	7	13	Ret	8	7	12	12	8	8	13	104
9	(Sweden) Christoffer Bergström	Ret	10	11	Ret	5	6				5	5	6	15	12	95
10	(Sweden) Patrick Rundqvist (Note: Patrick Rundqvist participated in the first three rounds in the Porsche Approved Cup.)	11	13	14	13	12	9	9	10	9	8	8	Ret	12	11	93
11	(Sweden) Robin Hansson	3	3	2	2	DNS	DNS									88
12	(Sweden) Krister Andero	10	12			13	10	4	7	12	11	13	11			76
13	(Sweden) Hampus Hedin	WD	WD	13	12	11	11	8	11	11				14	DNS	51
Guest drivers ineligible for points
-	(Sweden) Johan Kristoffersson			1	1						2	2	1	1	14	-
-	(Sweden) Tom Blomqvist										1	1	10			-
-	(Norway) Dennis Hauger							3	3	3				5	2	-
-	(Sweden) Emil Persson													6	3	-
-	(Sweden) Thed Björk	5	4													-
-	(Norway) Andreas Mikkelsen	7	5													-
-	(Denmark) Jan Magnussen			Ret	5											-
-	(Sweden) Rasmus Lindh													13	6	-
-	(Sweden) Hannes Morin			7	11											-
-	(Denmark) Christina Nielsen					10	8									-
-	(Sweden) Emil Öhman					14	12									-
Pos.	Driver	R1	R2	R1	R2	R1	R2	R1	R2	R3	R1	R2	R3	R1	R2	Points
Pos.	Driver	FAL (Sweden)		SKE (Sweden)		KAR (Sweden)		AND (Sweden)			MAN (Sweden)			KNU (Sweden)		Points

=== Porsche Approved Cup ===
Pos.	Driver	FAL (Sweden)		SKE (Sweden)		KAR (Sweden)		AND (Sweden)			MAN (Sweden)			KNU (Sweden)		Points
Pos.	Driver	R1	R2	R1	R2	R1	R2	R1	R2	R3	R1	R2	R3	R1	R2	Points
1	(Sweden) Patrick Rundqvist	11	13	14	13	12	9									162
Pos.	Driver	R1	R2	R1	R2	R1	R2	R1	R2	R3	R1	R2	R3	R1	R2	Points
Pos.	Driver	FAL (Sweden)		SKE (Sweden)		KAR (Sweden)		AND (Sweden)			MAN (Sweden)			KNU (Sweden)		Points

=== Masters' Cup ===
Pos.	Driver	FAL (Sweden)		SKE (Sweden)		KAR (Sweden)		AND (Sweden)			MAN (Sweden)			KNU (Sweden)		Points
Pos.	Driver	R1	R2	R1	R2	R1	R2	R1	R2	R3	R1	R2	R3	R1	R2	Points
1	(Sweden) Magnus Öhman	Ret	6	8	9	6	7	5	5	8	10	10	7	10	10	269
2	(Sweden) Carl Philip Bernadotte	9	9	13	10	7	13	Ret	8	7	12	12	8	8	13	228
3	(Sweden) Thomas Karlsson	Ret	7	9	8	9	Ret	7	9	10	9	11	9	9	9	223
4	(Sweden) Christoffer Bergström	Ret	10	11	Ret	5	6				5	5	6	15	12	187
5	(Sweden) Krister Andero	10	12			13	10	4	7	12	11	13	11			158
Pos.	Driver	R1	R2	R1	R2	R1	R2	R1	R2	R3	R1	R2	R3	R1	R2	Points
Pos.	Driver	FAL (Sweden)		SKE (Sweden)		KAR (Sweden)		AND (Sweden)			MAN (Sweden)			KNU (Sweden)		Points

=== Teams' Championship ===
Pos.	Team	Points
1	(Sweden) Steber Racing	385
2	(Sweden) Fragus Motorsport	367
3	(Sweden) Mtech Competition	333
4	(Sweden) Sundahl Racing	319
5	(Sweden) Nova Racing	184
6	(Sweden) Team Pampas	95
7	(Sweden) Prido Racing	76
8	(Norway) Heyerdahl Racing Team	0
9	(Norway) Hermansen Racing	0
10	(Norway) Jaffa Racing	0
