= 2022 Porsche Carrera Cup Scandinavia =

Motor racing competition

The 2022 Porsche Carrera Cup Scandinavia was the 19th Porsche Carrera Cup Scandinavia season. It began on 13 May at Anderstorp Raceway and ended on 1 October at Mantorp Park. The championship was primarily made up of the Porsche 911 GT3 Cup (Type 992), however teams could run the older Porsche 911 GT3 Cup (Type 991 II) and be entered into the "Porsche Approved Cup" category.

== Entry list ==
Team	No.	Drivers	Class	Rounds
(Sweden) Micke Kågered Racing	1	(Sweden) Lukas Sundahl		All
(Sweden) Micke Kågered Racing	22	(Sweden) Albin Wärnelöv	A	All
(Sweden) Micke Kågered Racing	36	(Sweden) Andreas Ahlberg	A	All
(Norway) Jaffa Racing	3	(Norway) Erlend Juan Olsen	A	All
(Norway) Jaffa Racing	51	(Norway) Ole William Nærsnes	A	3–6
(Germany) Porsche Experience Racing	8	(Sweden) Marcus Ericsson		6
(Germany) Porsche Experience Racing	23	(Denmark) Jan Magnussen		1, 3–5
(Germany) Porsche Experience Racing	92	(Sweden) Anton Marklund		4
(Germany) Porsche Experience Racing	911	(Norway) Dennis Hauger		2, 5
(Germany) Porsche Experience Racing	911	(Sweden) Felix Rosenqvist		6
(Sweden) Mtech Competition	9	(Sweden) Thomas Karlsson		All
(Sweden) Mtech Competition	20	(Sweden) Ola Nilsson		All
(Sweden) Mtech Competition	62	(Sweden) Lars-Bertil Rantzow	A	1, 3
(Sweden) Fragus Motorsport	11	(Sweden) Pontus Fredericsson		All
(Sweden) Fragus Motorsport	14	(Sweden) Robin Hansson	A	4–5
(Sweden) Fragus Motorsport	21	(Sweden) Kjelle Lejonkrands	A	All
(Sweden) Fragus Motorsport	25	(Sweden) Hampus Ericsson		All
(Sweden) Fragus Motorsport	27	(Sweden) Edvin Hellsten		All
(Sweden) Fragus Motorsport	28	(Sweden) Patrick Rundquist	A	1
(Sweden) Fragus Motorsport	44	(Sweden) Hampus Hedin		1, 3–6
(Sweden) Steber Racing	15	(Sweden) Hannes Morin	A	All
(Sweden) Steber Racing	71	(Sweden) Markus Löhnroth	A	All
(Sweden) Kristoffersson Motorsport	17	(Sweden) Gustav Bergström		1–4, 6
(Sweden) Kristoffersson Motorsport	45	(Sweden) Emil Persson		All
(Sweden) WestCoast Racing	32	(Sweden) Robin Knutsson		All
(Sweden) WestCoast Racing	48	(Sweden) Mikael Karlsson		1–4, 6
(Sweden) Team Pampas	42	(Sweden) Christoffer Bergström	A	All
(Sweden) Århage Motorsport	60	(Sweden) Franck Århage	A	1, 3, 5–6
(Sweden) Race Team Gelleråsen - By AFR	61	(Sweden) Marcus Annervi		All
(Sweden) Sipkar Motorsport	66	(Sweden) Nermin Sipkar	A	All
(Sweden) Kjellin Motorsport	91	(Sweden) Oscar Löfqvist		All

Icon	Class
A	Porsche Approved Cup
G	Guest

== Results ==
Round		Circuit	Date	Pole position	Fastest lap	Winning driver	Winning team	Porsche Approved Cup Winner
1	R1	(Sweden) Anderstorp Raceway	13–14 May	(Sweden) Lukas Sundahl	(Sweden) Pontus Fredericsson	(Sweden) Pontus Fredericsson	(Sweden) Fragus Motorsport	(Sweden) Hannes Morin
1	R2	(Sweden) Anderstorp Raceway	13–14 May	(Sweden) Lukas Sundahl	(Sweden) Lukas Sundahl	(Sweden) Lukas Sundahl	(Sweden) Micke Kågered Racing	(Sweden) Andreas Ahlberg
2	R1	(Sweden) Drivecenter Arena	17–18 June	(Sweden) Lukas Sundahl	(Norway) Dennis Hauger	(Sweden) Lukas Sundahl	(Sweden) Micke Kågered Racing	(Sweden) Hannes Morin
2	R2	(Sweden) Drivecenter Arena	17–18 June	(Sweden) Lukas Sundahl	(Sweden) Lukas Sundahl	(Sweden) Emil Persson	(Sweden) Kristoffersson Motorsport	(Sweden) Hannes Morin
2	R3 (Note: Race 3 at Drivecenter Arena was cancelled due to heavy fog. The race was moved to Anderstorp which was scheduled to take place before Races 1 and 2 that weekend, therefore "Race 3 at Drivecenter" actually took place at Anderstorp on 5 August. https://www.carreracup.se/nyheter/emil-persson-ensam-lordagssegrare-nar-dimman-stoppade-tredje-porsche-carrera-cup-racet-i-fallfors/)	(Sweden) Drivecenter Arena	17–18 June	(Sweden) Lukas Sundahl	(Sweden) Lukas Sundahl	(Sweden) Lukas Sundahl	(Sweden) Micke Kågered Racing	(Sweden) Kjelle Lejonkrands
3	R1	(Sweden) Anderstorp Raceway	5–6 August	(Sweden) Edvin Hellsten	(Sweden) Lukas Sundahl	(Sweden) Edvin Hellsten	(Sweden) Fragus Motorsport	(Sweden) Andreas Ahlberg
3	R2	(Sweden) Anderstorp Raceway	5–6 August	(Sweden) Lukas Sundahl	(Sweden) Lukas Sundahl	(Sweden) Lukas Sundahl	(Sweden) Micke Kågered Racing	(Sweden) Hannes Morin
4	R1	(Sweden) Karlskoga Motorstadion	19–20 August	(Sweden) Emil Persson	(Sweden) Ola Nilsson	(Sweden) Emil Persson	(Sweden) Kristoffersson Motorsport	(Sweden) Robin Hansson
4	R2	(Sweden) Karlskoga Motorstadion	19–20 August	(Sweden) Marcus Annervi	(Sweden) Emil Persson	(Sweden) Marcus Annervi	(Sweden) Race Team Gelleråsen - By AFR	(Sweden) Hannes Morin
5	R1	(Norway) Rudskogen	16–17 September	(Sweden) Ola Nilsson	(Sweden) Ola Nilsson	(Sweden) Ola Nilsson	(Sweden) Mtech Competition	(Sweden) Christoffer Bergström
5	R2	(Norway) Rudskogen	16–17 September	(Sweden) Ola Nilsson	(Sweden) Marcus Annervi	(Sweden) Ola Nilsson	(Sweden) Mtech Competition	(Sweden) Hannes Morin
5	R3	(Norway) Rudskogen	16–17 September	(Sweden) Ola Nilsson	(Denmark) Jan Magnussen	(Sweden) Ola Nilsson	(Sweden) Mtech Competition	(Sweden) Andreas Ahlberg
6	R1	(Sweden) Mantorp Park	30 September–1 October	(Sweden) Marcus Annervi	(Sweden) Emil Persson	(Sweden) Ola Nilsson	(Sweden) Mtech Competition	(Sweden) Andreas Ahlberg
6	R2	(Sweden) Mantorp Park	30 September–1 October	(Sweden) Felix Rosenqvist (Note: Felix Rosenqvist was awarded the point for pole position, however was given a 5-place penalty from Race 1, therefore Marcus Annervi started on pole. https://www.motorsport-events.se/camp/resultsmw/10%20results%202022/04%20Racing/PCCS/07%20Mantorp%20Park/16%20Startgrid%20Race%202.pdf) (Note: Felix Rosenqvist was awarded the point for pole position, however was given a 5-place penalty from Race 1, therefore Marcus Annervi started on pole. https://www.motorsport-events.se/camp/resultsmw/10%20results%202022/04%20Racing/PCCS/07%20Mantorp%20Park/16%20Startgrid%20Race%202.pdf)	(Sweden) Marcus Ericsson	(Sweden) Marcus Annervi	(Sweden) Race Team Gelleråsen - By AFR	(Sweden) Hannes Morin

== Championship standings ==
Race format

Race 1 is a 20-minute + 1 lap race being set by the results of Q1. Race 2 is a 30-minute + 1 lap race with 11th and below being set by Q1 results and the top 10 being set by a top-ten shootout in Q2. If there are three races, Q1 sets the grid for Race 1 and Race 2 with Q2 setting the grid for Race 3.

Scoring system

Position	1st	2nd	3rd	4th	5th	6th	7th	8th	9th	10th	11th	12th	13th	14th	15th	Pole	FL
Points	25	20	17	14	12	10	9	8	7	6	5	4	3	2	1	1	1

=== Drivers' Championship ===
Those highlighted in blue are Porsche Approved Cup entries.

Pos.	Driver	AND1 (Sweden)		SKE (Sweden)			AND2 (Sweden)		KAR (Sweden)		RUD (Norway)			MAN (Sweden)		Points
Pos.	Driver	R1	R2	R1	R2	R3	R1	R2	R1	R2	R1	R2	R3	R1	R2	Points
1	(Sweden) Lukas Sundahl	Ret	1	1	9	1	2	1	2	9	2	4	3	5	7	237
2	(Sweden) Ola Nilsson	5	7	3	5	3	6	3	3	5	1	1	1	1	8	236
3	(Sweden) Emil Persson	6	5	5	1	2	9	4	1	2	6	6	5	2	2	220
4	(Sweden) Hampus Ericsson	2	2	Ret	2	7	3	5	4	3	4	3	2	3	3	214
5	(Sweden) Marcus Annervi	4	4	7	4	4	4	20	15	1	3	2	7	20	1	179
6	(Sweden) Edvin Hellsten	Ret	6	6	7	6	1	2	5	4	7	7	8	6	4	161
7	(Sweden) Pontus Fredericsson	1	Ret	4	12	5	5	6	7	6	WD	WD	WD	4	6	121
8	(Sweden) Robin Knutsson	12	8	9	3	9	8	11	11	10	9	15	9	7	23	91
9	(Denmark) Jan Magnussen	3	3				7	Ret	6	7	8	8	6			89
10	(Sweden) Andreas Ahlberg	9	9	12	11	13	11	9	12	15	11	11	11	9	17	65
11	(Sweden) Hannes Morin	7	Ret	10	6	11	17	7	Ret	13	12	9	12	17	10	63
12	(Norway) Dennis Hauger			2	14	DNS					5	5	4			61
13	(Sweden) Mikael Karlsson	19	Ret	8	18	15	14	8	9	12				10	11	41
14	(Sweden) Oscar Löfqvist	Ret	DNS	14	Ret	8	10	12	14	11	13	10	14	Ret	14	40
15	(Sweden) Christoffer Bergström	10	13	11	10	12	Ret	Ret	16	19	10	19	16	15	12	35
16	(Sweden) Kjelle Lejonkrands	14	11	15	17	10	12	18	Ret	DNS	Ret	12	13	Ret	22	25
17	(Sweden) Gustav Bergström	16	10	13	8	Ret	Ret	15	17	14				Ret	13	23
18	(Sweden) Marcus Ericsson													8	5	21
19	(Sweden) Thomas Karlsson	15	Ret	19	15	14	13	Ret	13	17	14	13	10	21	19	21
20	(Sweden) Hampus Hedin	8	Ret				15	16	19	16	16	14	21	12	Ret	15
21	(Sweden) Anton Marklund								10	8						14
22	(Norway) Erlend Juan Olsen	13	12	16	13	17	21	Ret	21	20	15	Ret	20	16	15	12
23	(Norway) Ole William Nærsnes						16	10	18	Ret	20	16	Ret	11	16	11
24	(Sweden) Robin Hansson								8	DNS	WD	WD	WD			8
25	(Sweden) Felix Rosenqvist													DSQ	9	8
26	(Sweden) Albin Wärnelöv	18	14	17	16	18	20	14	20	18	17	17	17	14	18	6
27	(Sweden) Patrick Rundquist	11	Ret													5
28	(Sweden) Franck Århage	20	15				18	17			18	18	15	13	20	5
29	(Sweden) Lars-Bertil Rantzow	Ret	Ret				22	13								3
30	(Sweden) Markus Löhnroth	17	16	18	Ret	16	19	Ret	22	21	19	20	18	19	21	0
31	(Sweden) Nermin Sipkar	21	17	Ret	Ret	Ret	DSQ	19	23	22	21	21	19	18	Ret	0
Pos.	Driver	R1	R2	R1	R2	R3	R1	R2	R1	R2	R1	R2	R3	R1	R2	Points
Pos.	Driver	AND1 (Sweden)		SKE (Sweden)			AND2 (Sweden)		KAR (Sweden)		RUD (Norway)			MAN (Sweden)		Points

=== Porsche Approved Cup ===
Pos.	Driver	AND1 (Sweden)		SKE (Sweden)			AND2 (Sweden)		KAR (Sweden)		RUD (Norway)			MAN (Sweden)		Points
Pos.	Driver	R1	R2	R1	R2	R3	R1	R2	R1	R2	R1	R2	R3	R1	R2	Points
1	(Sweden) Andreas Ahlberg	9	9	12	11	13	11	9	12	15	11	11	11	9	17	283
2	(Sweden) Hannes Morin	7	Ret	10	6	11	17	7	Ret	13	13	9	12	17	10	274
3	(Sweden) Christoffer Bergström	10	13	11	10	12	Ret	Ret	16	19	10	19	16	15	12	198
4	(Sweden) Albin Wärnelöv	18	14	17	16	18	20	14	20	18	17	17	17	14	18	159
5	(Sweden) Kjelle Lejonkrands	14	11	15	17	10	12	18	Ret	DNS	Ret	12	13	Ret	22	149
6	(Norway) Erlend Juan Olsen	13	12	16	13	17	21	Ret	21	20	15	Ret	20	16	15	145
7	(Sweden) Markus Löhnroth	17	16	18	Ret	16	19	Ret	22	21	19	20	18	19	21	109
8	(Norway) Ole William Nærsnes						16	10	18	Ret	20	16	Ret	11	16	104
9	(Sweden) Franck Århage	20	15				18	17			18	18	15	13	20	99
10	(Sweden) Nermin Sipkar	21	17	Ret	Ret	Ret	DSQ	19	23	22	21	21	19	18	Ret	69
11	(Sweden) Robin Hansson								8	DNS	WD	WD	WD			28
12	(Sweden) Lars-Bertil Rantzow	Ret	Ret				22	13								21
13	(Sweden) Patrick Rundquist	11	Ret													14
Pos.	Driver	R1	R2	R1	R2	R3	R1	R2	R1	R2	R1	R2	R3	R1	R2	Points
Pos.	Driver	AND1 (Sweden)		SKE (Sweden)			AND2 (Sweden)		KAR (Sweden)		RUD (Norway)			MAN (Sweden)		Points

=== Teams' Championship ===
Pos.	Team	Points
1	(Sweden) Micke Kågered Racing	532
2	(Sweden) Fragus Motorsport	483
3	(Sweden) Steber Racing	364
4	(Sweden) Mtech Competition	273
5	(Norway) Jaffa Racing	247
6	(Sweden) Kristoffersson Motorsport	240
7	(Sweden) Team Pampas	197
8	(Germany) Porsche Experience Racing	189
9	(Sweden) Race Team Gelleråsen - By AFR	176
10	(Sweden) WestCoast Racing	132
11	(Sweden) Århage Motorsport	99
12	(Sweden) Sipkar Motorsport	69
13	(Sweden) Kjellin Motorsport	40
