= Drivecenter Arena =

Motorsport race track in Sweden

- Location: Fällfors, Sweden
- Coordinates: 65°6′27″N 20°45′40″E
- Operator: Jan Marklund
- Opened: 14 June 2019; 7 years ago
- Construction cost: SEK 45 million
- Architect: TTI GmbH
- Former names: Skellefteå Drive Center
- Major events: Future: PCC Scandinavia (2019–2020, 2022–2023, 2025, 2027); Former: Drift Masters (2022–2023); GT4 Scandinavia (2019, 2021–2022); STCC (2019–2022)
- Website: drivecenter.se

Full Circuit (2019–present)
- Length: 4.235 km (2.632 mi)
- Turns: 16
- Race lap record: 1:45.570 ( (Sweden) Hampus Ericsson, Porsche 911 (992 I) GT3 Cup, 2023, Carrera Cup)

Short Circuit (2019–present)
- Length: 3.370 km (2.094 mi)
- Turns: 13
- Race lap record: 1:31.003 ( (Sweden) Daniel Roos, Porsche 911 (992 I) GT3 Cup, 2025, Carrera Cup)

Drivecenter Arena, previously known as Skellefteå Drive Center, is a motorsport race track in Fällfors (Västerbotten County), Sweden. The circuit opened in 2019 having been converted from a retired Swedish Air Force base, Fällfors Air Base (ICAO: ESUF).

== History ==
Fällfors Air Base had been a modernised Swedish Air Force base with three runways and a reinforced section of adjoining highway to act as a spare runway. The base was built in the 1950s. The base operated Saab 29 Tunnan, Saab 32 Lansen, Saab 35 Draken and Saab 37 Viggen fighter-bombers over the years. One of its features was a mountain hangar built in rock in the dispersal area to the north of the runways. The base closed in 2006. The base was sold off and the Skellefteå Drive Center opened in 2008 and operated as a driver training and vehicle testing facility, with the former runways used occasionally for drag racing. After an ownership change in 2017 the anticipated motor racing circuit was completed and the held their first race on 14 June 2019. The circuit is 4.235 km (2.632 mi) long, the longest circuit in Sweden, approximately 210 m (690 ft) longer than Anderstorp Raceway.

At the opening Midnattsolsloppet meeting the circuit hosted both domestic and international motor racing with TCR Scandinavia, Formula Nordic, both the Swedish and North European Zone championships, Porsche Carrera Cup Scandinavia and GT4 Scandinavia racing series.

== Lap records ==
As of June 2025, the fastest official race lap records at the Drivecenter Arena are listed as:

Category	Time	Driver	Vehicle	Event
Full Circuit (2019–present): 4.235 km (2.632 mi)
Porsche Carrera Cup	1:45.570	Hampus Ericsson	Porsche 911 (992 I) GT3 Cup	2023 Skellefteå Porsche Carrera Cup Scandinavia round
Radical Cup	1:49.158	Filip Svensson	Radical SR3	2021 Skellefteå Radical Cup Scandinavia round
Formula Renault 1.6	1:53.197	Linus Granfors	Signatech FR1.6	2023 Skellefteå Formula Nordic round
TCR Touring Car	1:53.488	Oliver Söderström	Volkswagen Golf GTI TCR	2021 Skellefteå TCR STCC round
GT4	1:53.494	Magnus Gustavsen	Audi R8 LMS GT4	2021 Skellefteå GT4 Scandinavia round
Short Circuit (2019–present): 3.370 km (2.094 mi)
Porsche Carrera Cup	1:31.003	Daniel Roos	Porsche 911 (992 I) GT3 Cup	2025 Skellefteå Porsche Carrera Cup Scandinavia round
GT4	1:35.502	Lærke Rønn Sørensen	Porsche 718 Cayman GT4 RS Clubsport	2025 Skellefteå Porsche Sprint Challenge Scandinavia round
