= 2023 Porsche Carrera Cup Scandinavia =

Motor racing competition

The 2023 Porsche Carrera Cup Scandinavia was the 20th Porsche Carrera Cup Scandinavia season. It began on 12 May at Anderstorp Raceway and will end on 23 September at Mantorp Park. For the first time, Porsche Carrera Cup Scandinavia went to the Circuit de la Sarthe, Le Mans along with the Porsche Carrera Cup France. The championship is made up of the Porsche 911 GT3 Cup (Type 992) with Porsche Carrera Cup Scandinavia featuring the Pro-Am Cup for the first time, replacing the previous Masters' Cup and Porsche Approved Cup.

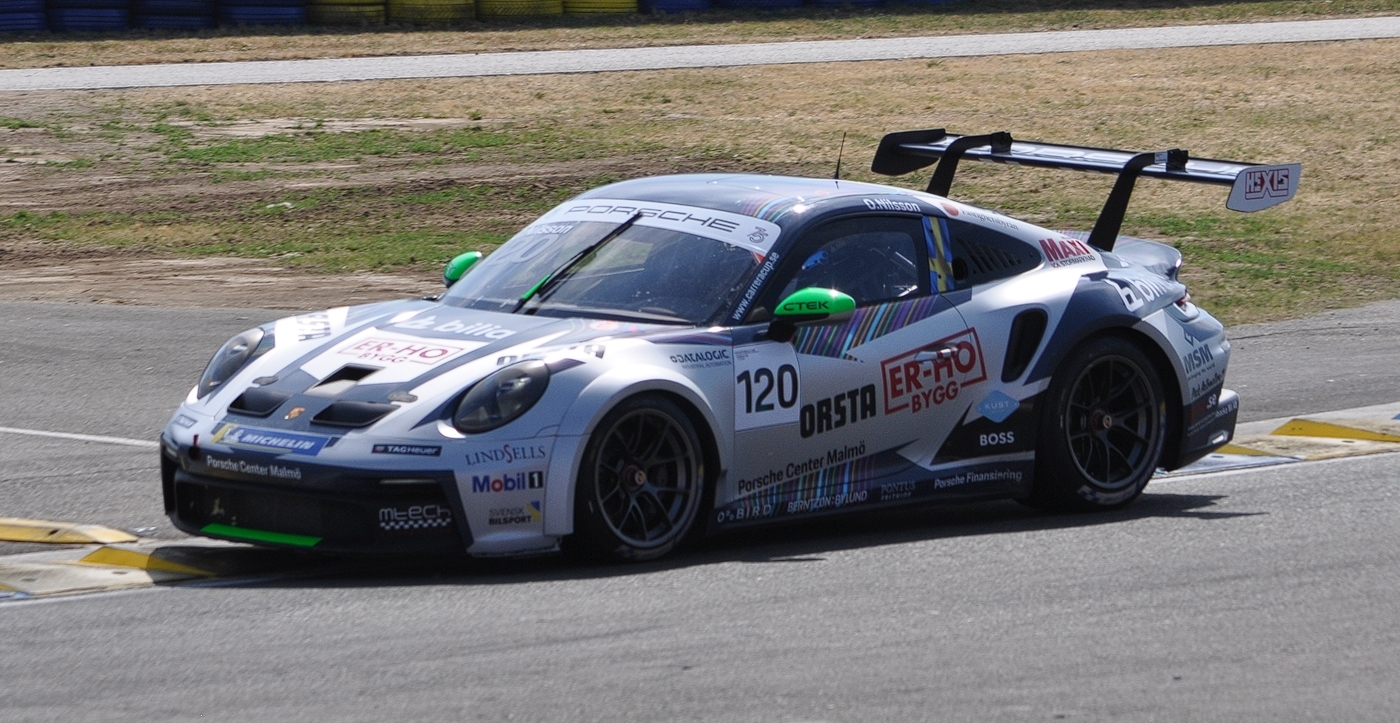
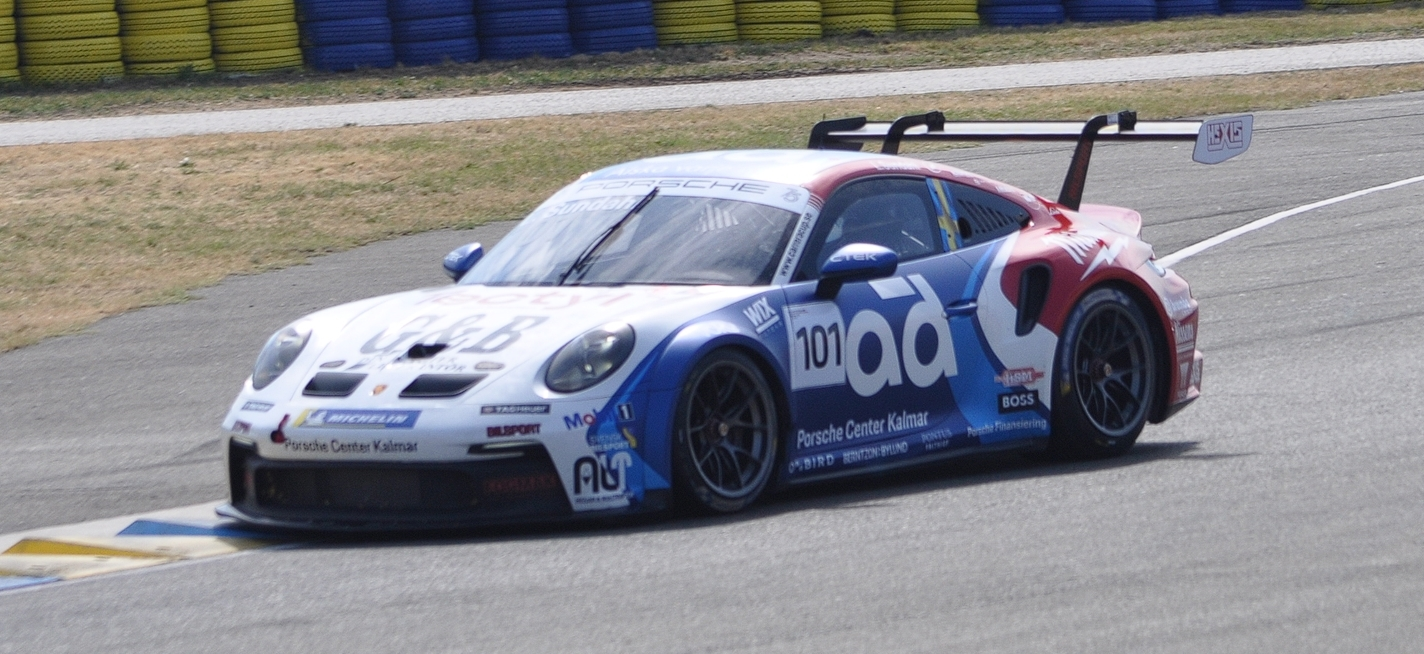
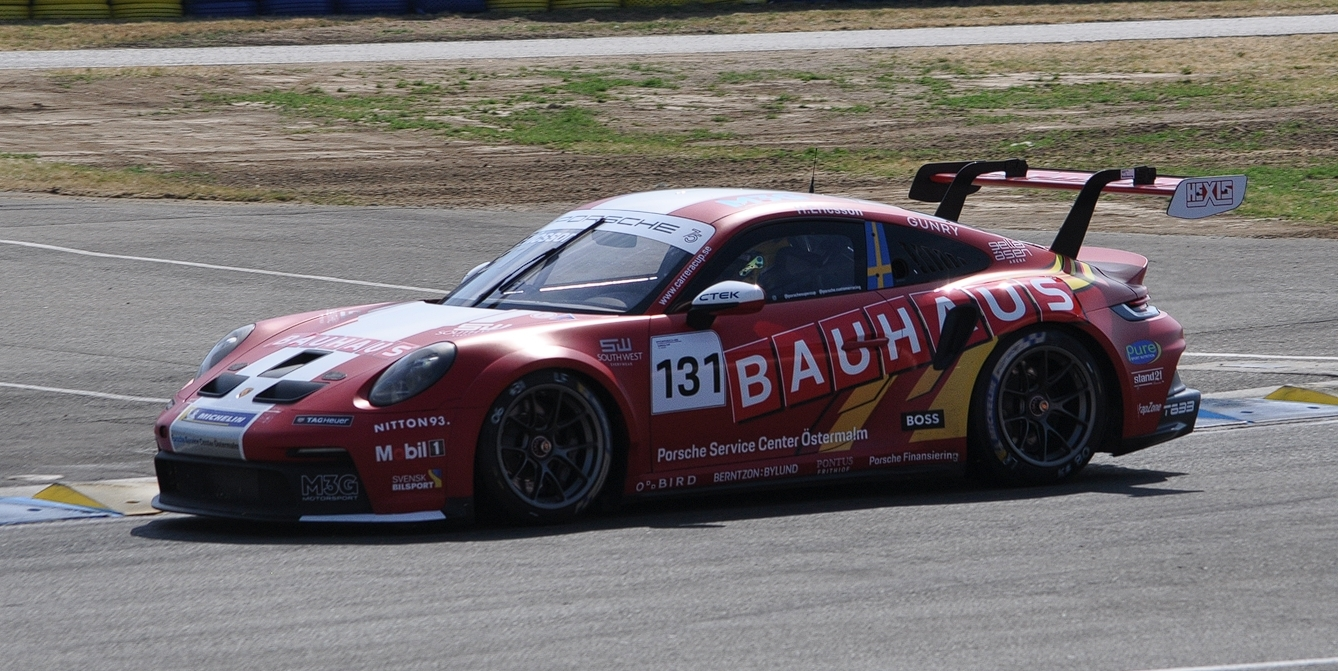
Ola Nilsson won the championship, Lukas Sundahl finished second and Hampus Ericsson finished third.

== Entry list ==
Team	No.	Drivers	Class	Rounds
(Sweden) Micke Kågered Racing	1	(Sweden) Lukas Sundahl		All
(Sweden) Micke Kågered Racing	22	(Sweden) Albin Wärnelöv	PA	All
(Sweden) Micke Kågered Racing	48	(Sweden) Mikael Karlsson	PA	All
(Sweden) Fragus Motorsport	4	(Sweden) Oscar Palm		5
(Sweden) Fragus Motorsport	14	(Sweden) Daniel Roos		1–2, 5–7
(Sweden) Fragus Motorsport	27	(Sweden) Edvin Hellsten		7
(Sweden) Fragus Motorsport	44	(Sweden) Hampus Hedin	PA	1, 3–4, 6–7
(Sweden) Mtech Competition	5	(Luxembourg) Dylan Pereira	G	2
(Sweden) Mtech Competition	9	(Sweden) Thomas Karlsson	PA	All
(Sweden) Mtech Competition	20	(Sweden) Ola Nilsson		All
(Germany) Porsche Experience Racing	8	(Sweden) Marcus Ericsson		7
(Germany) Porsche Experience Racing	13	(Sweden) Carl Phillip Bernadotte	PA	5, 7
(Germany) Porsche Experience Racing	23	(Denmark) Jan Magnussen		1
(Germany) Porsche Experience Racing	26	(Sweden) Linus Lundqvist		3–4
(Germany) Porsche Experience Racing	82	(Norway) Aksel Lund Svindal	PA	1–2, 5, 7
(Germany) Porsche Experience Racing	83	(Norway) Roar Lindland	PA	6
(Germany) Porsche Experience Racing	123	(Norway) Dennis Hauger	G	2
(Germany) Porsche Experience Racing	123	(Norway) Dennis Hauger		6
(Sweden) Steber Motorsport	15	(Sweden) Hannes Morin		3–4
(Sweden) M3G Motorsport	17	(Sweden) Gustav Bergström		All
(Sweden) M3G Motorsport	31	(Sweden) Hampus Ericsson		All
(Sweden) M3G Motorsport	45	(Sweden) Emil Persson		All
(Sweden) JC Raceteknik	19	(Sweden) Mikaela Åhlin-Kottulinsky		6–7
(Sweden) Race Team Gelleråsen By AFR	21	(Sweden) Kjelle Lejonkrans	PA	All
(Sweden) Race Team Gelleråsen By AFR	61	(Sweden) Marcus Annervi		All
(Sweden) WCR-Pampas	32	(Sweden) Robin Knutsson		1–5
(Sweden) WCR-Pampas	42	(Sweden) Christoffer Bergström	PA	All
(Norway) Ohana Racing	69	(Norway) Alexander Hagen Berg	PA	6
(Sweden) Kjellin Motorsport	91	(Sweden) Oscar Löfqvist	PA	All

Icon	Class
PA	Pro-Am Cup
G	Guest

== Results ==
Round		Circuit	Date	Pole position	Fastest lap	Winning driver	Winning team	Pro-Am Winner
1	R1	(Sweden) Anderstorp Raceway	12–13 May	(Sweden) Hampus Ericsson	(Sweden) Hampus Ericsson	(Sweden) Hampus Ericsson	(Sweden) M3G Motorsport	(Sweden) Mikael Karlsson
1	R2	(Sweden) Anderstorp Raceway	12–13 May	(Sweden) Lukas Sundahl	(Sweden) Lukas Sundahl	(Sweden) Ola Nilsson	(Sweden) Mtech Competition	(Sweden) Christoffer Bergström
2	R	(France) Circuit de la Sarthe	10 June	(Luxembourg) Dylan Pereira (Note: Dylan Pereira claimed the pole position as a guest driver. The bonus point was given to the highest qualified eligible driver – Ola Nilsson)	(Luxembourg) Dylan Pereira (Note: Dylan Pereira achieved the fastest lap as a guest driver. The bonus point was given to the fastest lap out of the eligible drivers – Ola Nilsson)	(Luxembourg) Dylan Pereira	(Sweden) Mtech Competition	(Sweden) Mikael Karlsson
3	R1	(Sweden) Drivecenter Arena	30 June	(Sweden) Lukas Sundahl	(Sweden) Lukas Sundahl	(Sweden) Hampus Ericsson	(Sweden) M3G Motorsport	(Sweden) Mikael Karlsson
3	R2	(Sweden) Drivecenter Arena	30 June	(Sweden) Ola Nilsson (Note: Lukas Sundahl was awarded the pole position after Ola Nilsson had pole position stripped of him, but Ola Nilsson kept the point.)	(Sweden) Lukas Sundahl	(Sweden) Lukas Sundahl	(Sweden) Micke Kågered Racing	(Sweden) Oscar Löfqvist
4	R1	(Sweden) Drivecenter Arena	1 July	(Sweden) Lukas Sundahl	(Sweden) Hampus Ericsson	(Sweden) Lukas Sundahl	(Sweden) Micke Kågered Racing	(Sweden) Mikael Karlsson
4	R2	(Sweden) Drivecenter Arena	1 July	(Sweden) Ola Nilsson	(Sweden) Hampus Ericsson	(Sweden) Ola Nilsson	(Sweden) Mtech Competition	(Sweden) Oscar Löfqvist
5	R1	(Sweden) Karlskoga Motorstadion	18–19 August	(Sweden) Hampus Ericsson	(Sweden) Hampus Ericsson	(Sweden) Hampus Ericsson	(Sweden) M3G Motorsport	(Sweden) Oscar Löfqvist
5	R2	(Sweden) Karlskoga Motorstadion	18–19 August	(Sweden) Ola Nilsson	(Sweden) Hampus Ericsson	(Sweden) Ola Nilsson	(Sweden) Mtech Competition	(Sweden) Kjelle Lejonkrans
6	R1	(Norway) Rudskogen	8–9 September	(Sweden) Ola Nilsson	(Norway) Dennis Hauger	(Sweden) Ola Nilsson	(Sweden) Mtech Competition	(Sweden) Christoffer Bergström
6	R2	(Norway) Rudskogen	8–9 September	(Sweden) Ola Nilsson	(Sweden) Ola Nilsson	(Sweden) Ola Nilsson	(Sweden) Mtech Competition	(Norway) Roar Lindland
6	R3	(Norway) Rudskogen	8–9 September	(Sweden) Ola Nilsson	(Sweden) Hampus Ericsson	(Sweden) Ola Nilsson	(Sweden) Mtech Competition	(Norway) Roar Lindland
7	R1	(Sweden) Mantorp Park	22–23 September	(Sweden) Ola Nilsson	(Sweden) Hampus Ericsson	(Sweden) Ola Nilsson	(Sweden) Mtech Competition	(Sweden) Kjelle Lejonkrans
7	R2	(Sweden) Mantorp Park	22–23 September	(Sweden) Ola Nilsson	(Sweden) Hampus Ericsson	(Sweden) Ola Nilsson	(Sweden) Mtech Competition	(Sweden) Mikael Karlsson

== Championship standings ==
Race format

Race 1 is a 20-minute + 1 lap race being set by the results of Q1. Race 2 is a 30-minute + 1 lap race with 11th and below being set by Q1 results and the top 10 being set by a top-ten shootout in Q2. If there are three races, Q1 sets the grid for Race 1 and Race 2 with Q2 setting the grid for Race 3.

Scoring system

Position	1st	2nd	3rd	4th	5th	6th	7th	8th	9th	10th	11th	12th	13th	14th	15th	Pole	FL
Points	25	20	17	14	12	10	9	8	7	6	5	4	3	2	1	1	1

=== Drivers' Championship ===
Those highlighted in blue are Pro-Am entries.

Pos.	Driver	AND (Sweden)		LMS (France)	SKE1 (Sweden)		SKE2 (Sweden)		KAR (Sweden)		RUD (Norway)			MAN (Sweden)		Points
Pos.	Driver	R1	R2	R	R1	R2	R1	R2	R1	R2	R1	R2	R3	R1	R2	Points
1	(Sweden) Ola Nilsson	4	1	4	Ret	DNS	7	1	5	1	1	1	1	1	1	263
2	(Sweden) Lukas Sundahl	2	2	6	2	1	1	6	3	3	3	3	2	3	3	260
3	(Sweden) Hampus Ericsson	1	3	14	1	5	2	2	1	2	4	5	4	2	2	257
4	(Sweden) Emil Persson	6	7	3	9	3	3	4	2	Ret	5	6	7	7	4	168
5	(Sweden) Marcus Annervi	3	4	7	4	2	Ret	Ret	4	5	6	4	Ret	4	5	151
6	(Sweden) Daniel Roos	9	Ret	5					6	4	7	7	5	6	7	94
7	(Sweden) Gustav Bergström	10	6	Ret	8	9	9	7	11	7	10	10	8	Ret	8	89
8	(Sweden) Robin Knutsson	7	12	2	5	Ret	4	14	7	6						85
9	(Sweden) Mikael Karlsson	8	10	8	7	11	8	9	16	9	16	13	10	13	10	77
10	(Sweden) Kjelle Lejonkrans	13	Ret	10	10	10	10	11	9	8	12	11	11	8	11	75
11	(Sweden) Christoffer Bergström	12	8	12	12	14	Ret	13	10	16	8	9	9	10	14	62
12	(Norway) Dennis Hauger (Note: Dennis Hauger was ineligible for points at Round 2 but was eligible for points at Round 6.)			Ret							2	2	3			58
13	(Sweden) Linus Lundqvist				3	4	6	3								58
14	(Sweden) Oscar Löfqvist	Ret	13	9	13	6	Ret	8	8	10	11	17	12	Ret	13	58
15	(Sweden) Albin Wärnelöv	14	11	11	11	8	11	10	14	13	13	12	15	16	16	50
16	(Sweden) Hannes Morin				6	7	5	5								43
17	(Sweden) Thomas Karlsson	15	9	Ret	15	12	Ret	Ret	12	14	17	14	14	11	18	28
18	(Norway) Roar Lindland										9	8	6			25
19	(Denmark) Jan Magnussen	5	5													24
20	(Sweden) Edvin Hellsten													5	6	22
21	(Sweden) Hampus Hedin	11	15		14	13	12	12			14	15	16	17	17	22
22	(Sweden) Marcus Ericsson													9	9	14
23	(Sweden) Carl Phillip Bernadotte								13	12				14	15	10
24	(Sweden) Mikaela Åhlin-Kottulinsky										15	18	17	12	12	9
25	(Norway) Aksel Lund Svindal	Ret	14	13					17	15				15	19	8
26	(Sweden) Oscar Palm								15	11						6
27	(Norway) Alexander Hagen Berg										Ret	16	13			3
Guest drivers ineligible for points
-	(Luxembourg) Dylan Pereira			1												-
Pos.	Driver	R1	R2	R	R1	R2	R1	R2	R1	R2	R1	R2	R3	R1	R2	Points
Pos.	Driver	AND (Sweden)		LMS (France)	SKE1 (Sweden)		SKE2 (Sweden)		KAR (Sweden)		RUD (Norway)			MAN (Sweden)		Points

=== Pro-Am Cup ===
Pos.	Driver	AND (Sweden)		LMS (France)	SKE1 (Sweden)		SKE2 (Sweden)		KAR (Sweden)		RUD (Norway)			MAN (Sweden)		Points
Pos.	Driver	R1	R2	R	R1	R2	R1	R2	R1	R2	R1	R2	R3	R1	R2	Points
1	(Sweden) Mikael Karlsson	8	10	8	7	11	8	9	16	9	16	13	10	13	10	268
2	(Sweden) Kjelle Lejonkrans	13	Ret	10	10	10	10	11	9	8	12	11	11	8	11	240
3	(Sweden) Christoffer Bergström	12	8	12	12	14	Ret	13	10	16	8	9	9	10	14	213
4	(Sweden) Oscar Löfqvist	Ret	13	9	13	6	Ret	8	8	10	11	17	12	Ret	13	196
5	(Sweden) Albin Wärnelöv	14	11	11	11	8	11	10	14	13	13	12	15	16	16	186
6	(Sweden) Thomas Karlsson	15	9	Ret	15	12	Ret	Ret	12	14	17	14	14	11	18	127
7	(Sweden) Hampus Hedin	11	15		14	13	12	12			14	15	16	17	17	118
8	(Norway) Roar Lindland										9	8	6			72
9	(Norway) Aksel Lund Svindal	Ret	14	13					17	15				15	19	54
10	(Sweden) Carl Phillip Bernadotte								13	12				14	15	50
11	(Norway) Alexander Hagen Berg										Ret	16	13			21
Pos.	Driver	R1	R2	R	R1	R2	R1	R2	R1	R2	R1	R2	R3	R1	R2	Points
Pos.	Driver	AND (Sweden)		LMS (France)	SKE1 (Sweden)		SKE2 (Sweden)		KAR (Sweden)		RUD (Norway)			MAN (Sweden)		Points

=== Teams' Championship ===
Pos.	Team	Points
1	(Sweden) Micke Kågered Racing	523
2	(Sweden) M3G Motorsport	426
3	(Sweden) Race Team Gelleråsen By AFR	388
4	(Sweden) Mtech Competition	379
5	(Germany) Porsche Experience Racing	310
6	(Sweden) WCR-Pampas	296
7	(Sweden) Fragus Motorsport	223
8	(Sweden) Kjellin Motorsport	189
9	(Sweden) Steber Motorsport	43
10	(Norway) Ohana Racing	18
11	(Sweden) JC Raceteknik	9
