= Swedish Karting Championship =

The Swedish Karting Championship was a karting racing event organized every by Svenska Bilsportförbundet.

== Formula Yamaha ==
Season	Driver	Team	Club	Points
2005	John Hedlund	PDB Racing Team Sweden	Borås MK	119
2006	Dick Olsson	Mac Minarelli Swe	Skövde MK	215
2007	Rasmus Mårthen	N/A	Mora MK	251

== Karting Formula 2 ==
Season	Driver	Team	Club	Points
2005	Philip Forsman	Forsman Motorsport	Södertälje KRC	122
2006	Jimmy Lindberg	Ward Racing	Kalmar MK	243
2007	Kevin Kleveros	Ward Racing	Uddevalla KK	251

== Senior 125 ==
Season	Driver	Team	Club
2020	Viktor Öberg	PDB Racing Team Sweden	FMCK Borås
2021	Max Sjölander	AD Motorsport	Varggropens Kart Racing
