= Oskar Palm =

Swedish footballer

Personal information
- Full name: Nils Gustav Oskar Palm
- Date of birth: 21 January 1904
- Place of birth: Stockholm, Sweden
- Date of death: 10 September 1957 (aged 53)
- Position: Midfielder

Senior career*
| Years | Team | Apps | (Gls) |
| 1922–1923 | Djurgården | | |
| 1924–1926 | AIK | | |
- Reymersholms IK
- Djurgården
- * Club domestic league appearances and goals

Nils Gustav Oskar Palm (21 January 1904 – 10 September 1957) is a Swedish former footballer who played as a midfielder. Palm made 20 Svenska Serien and Allsvenskan appearances for Djurgården and scored 7 goals.
