= William Heinecke =

American-born Thai businessman (born 4. June 1949)

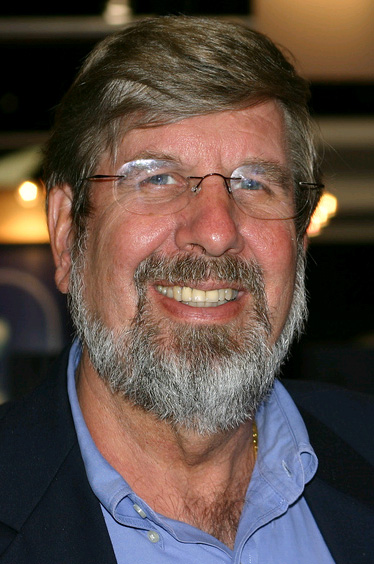
William Heinecke, 2006

William Ellwood Heinecke (Thai: วิลเลียม เอ็ลล์วู๊ด ไฮเน็ค; born 4. June 1949) is an American-born Thai businessman. He is the founder and chairman of Minor International PCL. The company includes Minor Hotels, Minor Food, and Minor Lifestyle.

As of 2025, he is among the twenty richest men in Thailand.

== Early life ==
Heinecke moved to Bangkok in 1963 at the age of 14 with his family, having previously lived in Japan, Hong Kong, and Malaysia. Heinecke's father spent 25 years in the United States military, serving in World War II and the Korean War. When he retired, he joined the foreign service. His mother was an Asia correspondent for Time magazine. Heinecke studied at the International School Bangkok, and persuaded the editor of the now-defunct Bangkok World to let him write a weekly column on go-carting. In return, he received advertising space alongside it.

== Career ==
At age 17, while still a high school student, Heinecke took over from the Bangkok World's advertising manager. One year later, he founded Inter-Asian Enterprise, to supply office cleaning services, and Inter-Asian Publicity, a radio advertising company, using US$1,200 he had borrowed. He later sold Inter-Asia Publicity to Ogilvy & Mather. In 1967, he founded Minor Holdings, which over the next four decades would grow into The Minor Group, including more than 30 companies.

Heinecke had his first hotel venture in 1978 with the opening of the Royal Garden Resort Pattaya. His business ventures have included advertising agencies and other hotels in Bangkok, Hua Hin, Phuket, Chiang Mai, and Chiang Rai, as well as outside of Thailand. He also introduced American-style fast foods to Thailand in the late 1970s and 1980s — brands like Mister Donut, The Pizza Company, and Burger King. Heinecke naturalized as a Thai citizen in 1991, renouncing United States citizenship in the process. He was the president of the American Chamber of Commerce in Thailand, and sat on the Prime Minister’s Foreign Investment Advisory Council. He is a supporter of the Thai Elephant Conservation Center, and authored The Entrepreneur, which has been translated into a number of languages.

=== Minor International ===
Minor International (MINT) is a global company focused on three core businesses: hospitality, restaurants, and lifestyle brands distribution. In the hospitality sector, its subsidiary Minor Hotels is a hotel owner, operator, and investor with a portfolio of over 550 hotels under the brands of Anantara Hotels & Resorts, Avani Hotels & Resorts, Elewana Collection, Oaks Hotels, Resorts & Suites, NH Hotels, NH Collection, nhow Hotels, and Tivoli Hotels & Resorts in over 55 countries across Asia-Pacific, the Middle East, Africa, the Indian Ocean, Europe, and the Americas. Its restaurant division is one of Asia's largest, with over 2,600 outlets system-wide in 26 countries, featuring a selection of brands such as The Pizza Company, The Coffee Club, Riverside, Benihana, Thai Express, Bonchon, Swensen’s, Sizzler, Dairy Queen, and Burger King, among others. MINT is also one of Thailand’s largest distributors of lifestyle brands and contract manufacturers. Some of its notable brands include Anello, Bodum, Bossini, Brooks Brothers, Charles & Keith, Esprit, Etam, Joseph Joseph, OVS, Radley, Scomadi, Zwilling J. A. Henckels, and Minor Smart Kids.

In 2017, Minor Hotels bought a 74% stake in London restaurant group Corbin & King, which includes establishments such as The Wolseley. In 2022, it bought the remainder of the group at auction for £60 million, leading to the rebranding of the group as The Wolseley Hospitality Group.

== Awards ==
In 2013, Heinecke received the ABLF Trailblazer Award from the Asian Business Leadership Forum (ABLF) Awards held in Dubai, United Arab Emirates, managed by Indian Expressions. In June 2022, he was featured on the Global 100 in Hospitality list by the International Hospitality Institute as one of the 100 Most Powerful People in Global Hospitality.

== Philanthropy ==
Heinecke has been involved in The St. Regis Bangkok Charity Gala & Auction held on an annual basis, contributing to raising funds for nominated organizations under Her Royal Highness Princess Maha Chakri Sirindhorn, the second daughter of King Bhumibol Adulyadej.
