= Global Hotel Alliance =

Alliance of independent hotel brands

- Company type: Private
- Industry: Hospitality; Tourism
- Founded: 2004; 22 years ago
- Headquarters: Dubai, United Arab Emirates
- Key people: Christopher Hartley (CEO)
- Website: www.globalhotelalliance.com

Global Hotel Alliance (GHA) is the world's largest alliance of hotel brands. Based on the airline alliance model, it was founded in 2004 by four hotel chains, Kempinski, Pan Pacific Hotels and Resorts, Rydges Hotels & Resorts, and Wyndham International. GHA uses a shared technology platform for its member brands, and operates a multi-brand loyalty programme, GHA DISCOVERY, which has over 24 million members, as of June 2023. The alliance encompasses 800 upscale and luxury hotels, across 40 brands in 100 countries.

== Brands ==
As of December 2025, member brands include:

- Anantara Hotels & Resorts
- Andronis
- Araiya Hotels & Resorts
- Arjaan Hotel Apartments
- ASMALLWORLD
- Avani Hotels & Resorts
- Bristoria Hotels
- Capella Hotels & Resorts
- Centro Hotels
- Cheval Collection
- Cinnamon Hotels & Resorts
- Corinthia Hotels
- Divani Collection Hotels
- The Doyle Collection
- Edge by Rotana
- Elewana Collection
- iclub Hotels
- JA Resorts & Hotels
- Kempinski Hotels
- Lanson Place
- The Leela Palaces, Hotels and Resorts
- Lore Group
- Lungarno Collection
- Maqo
- Marco Polo Hotels
- Mysk by Shaza
- NH Hotels
- NH Collection
- nhow Hotels
- Niccolo Hotels
- Nikki Beach Hotels & Resorts
- NUO Hotels
- Oaks Hotels, Resorts & Suites
- OUTRIGGER Resorts & Hotels
- Pan Pacific Hotels and Resorts
- Paramount Hotels
- PARKROYAL COLLECTION
- PARKROYAL Hotels & Resorts
- Patina Hotels & Resorts
- Rayhaan Hotels & Resorts
- Regal Hotels
- The Residence by Cenizaro
- Rotana Hotels
- Saii Hotels & Resorts
- The Set Collection
- Shaza Hotels
- The Sukhothai Hotels & Resorts
- Sun International
- Sunway Hotels & Resorts
- Tivoli Hotels & Resorts
- Ultratravel Collection
- Unike Hoteller
- Verdi Hotels
- Viceroy Hotels and Resorts
