= Hilton Sandton =

Hotel in Sandton, South Africa

- The Prince of Wales unveiling the plaque at the hotel's opening, 1 November 1997
- Alternative names: Sandton Hilton; NH Sandton; NH Johannesburg Sandton

General information
- Location: 138 Rivonia Road, Sandton, South Africa
- Coordinates: 26.1015°S 28.0599°E
- Opening: 1 November 1997
- Owner: Cavaleros Group
- Operator: Hilton Hotels & Resorts (1997–2024); Minor Hotels (2024–present)

Technical details
- Floor count: 8

Design and construction
- Architecture firm: Bentel Associates International
- Developer: Cavaleros Group

Other information
- Number of rooms: 329

The Hilton Sandton, also known as the Sandton Hilton, is a hotel on Rivonia Road in Sandton, South Africa, that has traded since 2024 as NH Sandton and later as NH Johannesburg Sandton. The 329-room building was developed by the Cavaleros Group, which still owns it, and was opened on 1 November 1997 by Charles, Prince of Wales. Hilton managed the hotel until Minor Hotels took over on 1 July 2024, and a phased renovation began in 2026. The Netherlands national football team was based at the hotel for the 2010 FIFA World Cup.

== History ==
=== Development and opening ===
The hotel was developed by the Cavaleros Group, a privately owned South African property company, which still owns it. The architects were Bentel Associates International. Work had started by December 1995, when The Times described it as a £38 million, 324-room hotel for Hilton International.

It was opened on 1 November 1997 by Charles, Prince of Wales, who was on an official three-nation tour of Africa. His son Prince Harry, then 13, stood beside him at the ceremony; it was the day of Harry's first public appearance since the funeral of his mother, Diana, Princess of Wales. A news report the next day called it "a British-owned Hilton hotel" and said that father and son had gone on from the opening to a charity concert at which the Spice Girls performed. The Times reported that it was Harry's first overseas public engagement, that father and son had been reunited in a private suite at the hotel after Harry's safari holiday in Botswana, that Harry shook hands with chefs, waiters and other staff as the two toured the kitchens, and that the Prince of Wales delivered a speech declaring the hotel open. Hilton managed the hotel from its opening until 2024.

=== Hilton years ===
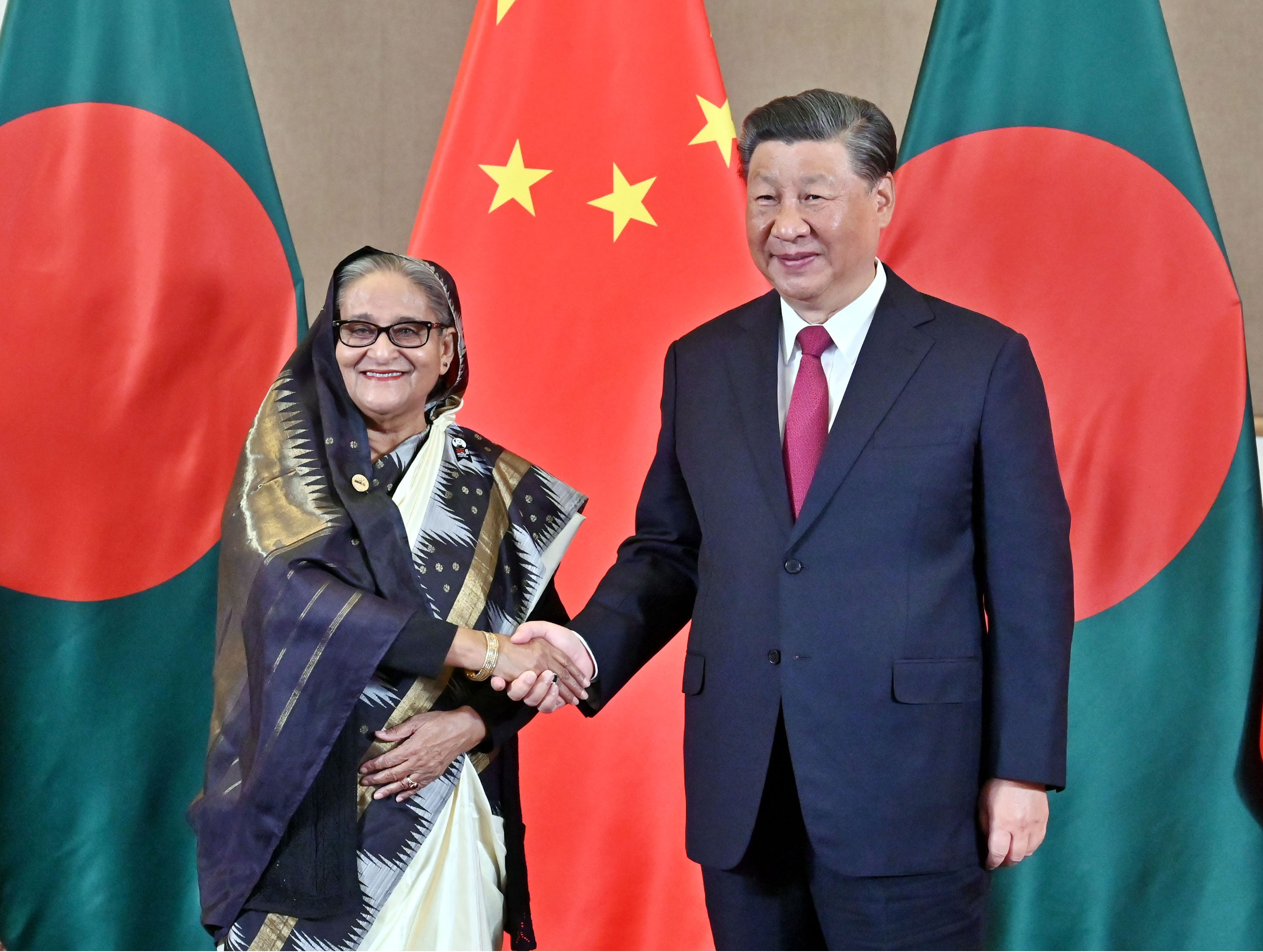
Sheikh Hasina meeting Xi Jinping at the hotel, 23 August 2023

In February 2010 FIFA published the team base camps for the 2010 FIFA World Cup, with the Netherlands squad at the Hilton Sandton. BBC Sport noted that the Dutch had chosen a hotel "at the heart of the business district" instead of "a traditional African retreat". The writer R. W. Johnson reported that the team had booked its accommodation only until 5 July and, having stayed in the tournament longer than it expected, moved to the Sunnyside Park Hotel outside Sandton; the Netherlands went on to lose the final.

The guest rooms were refurbished in stages from 2010, starting with the second and third floors. In February 2011 the hotel announced that two months of work on the 53 rooms and four suites on the first floor had been completed.

On 23 August 2023, during the 15th BRICS summit in Johannesburg, Chinese president Xi Jinping and Bangladeshi prime minister Sheikh Hasina held a bilateral meeting at the hotel.

=== Change of operator ===
In April 2024 Minor Hotels, part of Minor International, announced an agreement with the Cavaleros Group to manage the hotel from 1 July 2024. The hotel was to trade at first as NH Sandton and then, after a refurbishment, as NH Collection Sandton, which Minor described as the first hotel under its NH Collection brand in Africa. Penny Cavaleros, chief executive of the Cavaleros Group, said the owners had spoken to international hotel groups over the previous three years before choosing Minor.

Minor took over on 1 July 2024 and reopened the hotel as NH Sandton, its first property in South Africa. The hotel then employed 290 people. Alexi Cavaleros, the Cavaleros Group's head of international acquisitions, said it had taken the family "a really long time" to find a new operator, but did not explain why it had parted with Hilton after 27 years. Minor said the renovation would be carried out without closing the hotel.

Work began in April 2026, by which time the hotel was trading as NH Johannesburg Sandton. The first phase covered the 800-seat ballroom and ten meeting rooms and was finished in June 2026; the 329 guest rooms were to follow. The Cavaleros Group has put the cost of the whole project at R500 million.

== Building and facilities ==
The hotel is at 138 Rivonia Road in Sandton's business district, about 0.8 kilometres (0.5 mi) from the Sandton Convention Centre and about 32 kilometres (20 mi) from O. R. Tambo International Airport.

According to its architects, the building has eight storeys and stands on a trapezoid-shaped site. Four wings extend from a central atrium, which is entered through a porte-cochère. The 329 rooms, which include suites and a presidential suite, are on six of the floors.

A 2017 review described a central staircase with a steel sculpture above it, a lounge bar on the ground floor, an executive lounge on the sixth floor, and a first floor with the main restaurant, a teppanyaki and sushi bar, the meeting rooms and a business centre. The grounds have a swimming pool, a tennis court and a gym. Minor Hotels said in 2024 that after refurbishment the hotel would still have 329 rooms and suites, with two restaurants, two bars, an executive lounge, conference rooms, a gym and an outdoor pool.
