= MJets =

Thai charter airline

IATA	ICAO	Call sign
-	MJJ	SPEEDY
- Founded: 2007; 19 years ago
- Fleet size: 8
- Destinations: Point to point
- Parent company: Minor International
- Headquarters: Bangkok, Thailand
- Key people: William Heinecke, Nishita Shah
- Website: www.mjets.com

MJets is a business jet charter airline based in Thailand.

The company was established 2007 as Minor Aviation by William Heinecke and Nishita Shah. As well as aircraft charter and management, the company also has a maintenance operation.

The airline has a fixed base operation at Donmueng, Thailand, New Delhi, India and in Yangon, Myanmar.
