= Minor Food Group =

Thai food service company

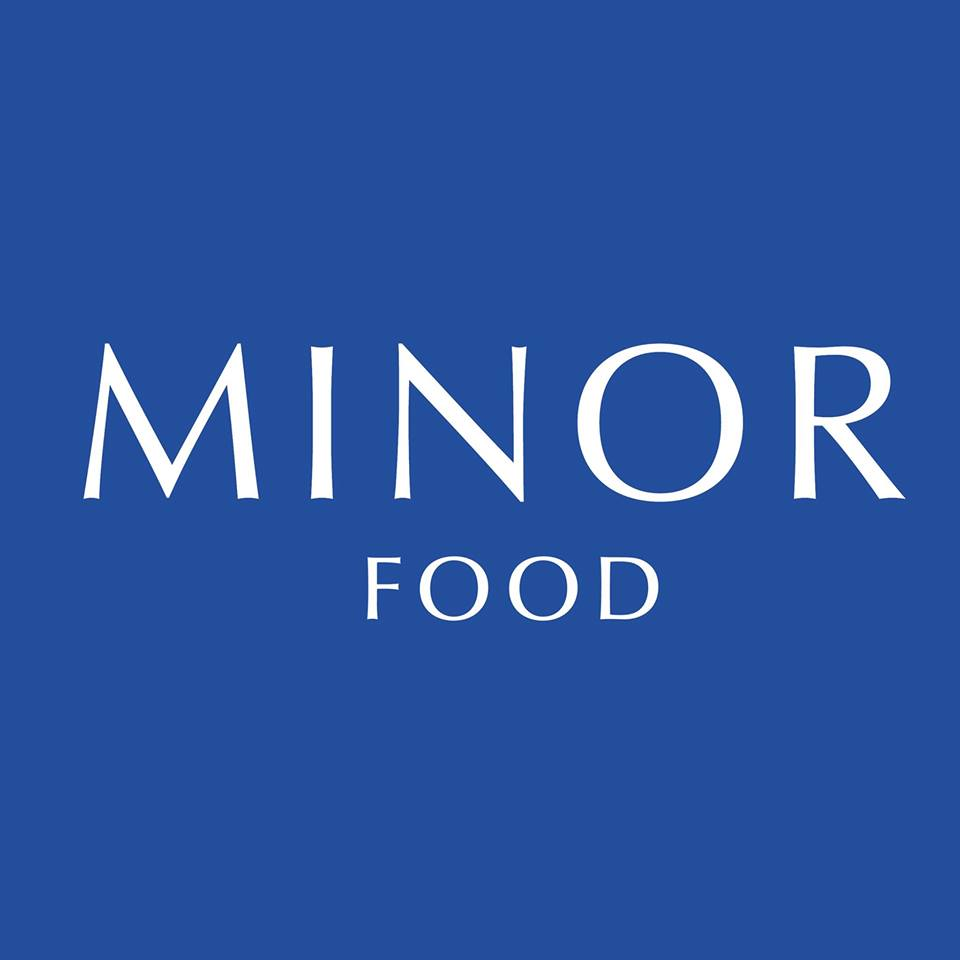
- Native name: ไมเนอร์ ฟู้ด กรุ๊ป
- Type: Subsidiary
- Industry: Food service
- Founded: 1980
- Founder: William E. Heinecke
- Headquarters: Bangkok, Thailand
- Area served: Asia-Pacific; Middle East; Europe
- Services: Restaurant; Franchising; Food delivery
- Parent: Minor International
- Website: www.minorfood.com

Minor Food Group (Thai: ไมเนอร์ ฟู้ด กรุ๊ป, Chinese: 美诺食品集团) is one of three subsidiary businesses under Minor International (traded as MINT on the Stock Exchange of Thailand). It is one of the largest restaurant chains in the Asia Pacific region. The company was established by American-born Thai businessman William E. Heinecke in 1980, with headquarters in Bangkok, Thailand.Its services include casual dining restaurants, quick service restaurants, food service and delivery.

Minor Food Group has operated many restaurant brands, such as The Pizza Company, Swensen’s, Sizzler, Dairy Queen, Burger King, The Coffee Club, Riverside Grilled Fish, Basil, ThaiXpress and Benihana. It has also acquired manufacturing plants for dairy and coffee ingredients.

== History ==
Minor Food Group was founded by Bill Heinecke 1980. The company was originally intended to bring Western dining styles to Thailand where there were few fast-food competitors. Pizza Hut was its first product. The company also brought the San Francisco ice-cream franchise Swensen’s to Thailand. It was the first company to provide home and office delivery, beginning with pizza delivery. Minor Cheese Limited (MCL) and Minor Dairy Limited (MDL) were subsequently developed, along with Sizzler, self-service dining restaurants.

The company introduced Dairy Queen soft serve ice-cream brand to Thailand in 1996, and, in 2000, it also introduced Burger King. In Thailand, the franchises offer Thai Spiced Chicken with Sticky Rice and other seasonal menu. After the contract with Pizza Hut expired, Minor Food established its own pizza brand, The Pizza Company, in 2001. The Pizza Company has franchises in Kuwait, United Arab Emirates. Saudi Arabia, China, Philippines and Cambodia.

In 2005, it established intercompany brand as BreadTalk to run a bakery business in Thailand with the Breadtalk Group, the Singaporean listed company.

Two years later, Minor Food developed a web ordering platform for food delivery. 1112Delivery began by serving the Bangkok metropolitan area, and then began expanding. A call center project was implemented to be the main hotline for other brands under Minor Food Group in early 2019.

By 2019, Minor Food Group owned and operated 2,254 restaurant outlets.

== International investment ==
Minor Food Group invested in the Australia’s Coffee Club café and restaurant chain, acquiring a half stake in 2008. There are 10+ branches in Thailand in 2016. It has also invested in China, buying 49 percent of Beijing Riverside & Courtyard, a casual dining Sichuan restaurant chain.

Together with S&P Syndicate PCL, Minor Food Group established Patara Fine Thai Cuisine, a Thai culinary school and training center. it also invested in Grab Thai, grab-and-go food business in London.
