= IEDEA =

UAE business organization

- Formerly: Indian Expressions
- Company type: Private
- Founder: Malini N. Menon
- Headquarters: DMCC Free Zone, Dubai, United Arab Emirates
- Area served: GCC; Middle East; Asia
- Key people: Malini N. Menon (Founder & Managing Director)
- Services: Business ideation; publishing; PR; event strategy
- Website: iedea.com

IEDEA is an agency, founded by Malini N. Menon, headquartered in Dubai, UAE, and registered with the DMCC. The company's goal is to facilitate intra-Asian businesses through publishing initiatives, digital forums, events, and more.

IEDEA's Asian Business Leadership Forum is an event series hosted under the patronage of Nahyan bin Mubarak Al Nahyan, UAE cabinet member, Minister of State Tolerance, and commissioner general of Expo 2020, and in association with the UAE Ministry of Economy.

IEDEA is also the official outreach partner to a number of UAE government initiatives, such as the World Government Summit, Dubai Investment Week, Global Women's Forum Dubai, and the UAE's National Program for Happiness and Wellbeing, among others. Since 2018, IEDEA is also a strategic partner of Dubai Cares.

The company owns, co-owns, and manages brand, event, and publishing IP portfolios, such as the Asian Business Leadership Forum Awards, TopicIndia.com, the "Images of Success" series, and the "ICLF Series", among others.

== Projects ==
=== Asian Business Leadership Forum ===
The Asian Business Leadership Forum (ABLF) is an annual event series that celebrates high achievers in Asian business. In its inaugural edition, the ABLF Awards 2011 recognized 14 business leaders across five categories in the three Asian regions of the Persian Gulf, India, and Southeast Asia.

According to Kamal Nath, Indian Urban Development Minister, "Events like the ABLF Awards are important because they support the opportunity of engagement between Asian countries. The Persian Gulf, India and South-East Asia are amongst the fastest growing regions in the world, and I am sure that this event will engage the best entrepreneurial minds and business talent from the regions."

Ahmed bin Saeed Al Maktoum, chairman and chief executive of the Emirates Group, said, "I am very glad that the UAE is participating at the Asian Business Leadership Forum Awards, an event that celebrates Asia as a whole."

The third edition of the ABLF Awards took place on 14 December 2013, at the Armani Hotel in Dubai. Some awardees included Ahmed bin Saeed Al Maktoum, president of the Dubai Civil Aviation Authority; Khalifa bin Salman Al Khalifa, Prime Minister of Bahrain; Chua Sock Koong, CEO of Singtel; Prathap C. Reddy, chairman of Apollo Hospitals; and William E. Heinecke, CEO and chairman of Minor International.

During the 2013 award show, ABLF featured an "India-UAE" showcase that celebrated six India–UAE business icons responsible for growing socioeconomic ties between the two nations. These included Abdullah Mohammed Saleh, governor of the Dubai International Financial Centre; M. A. Yousuf Ali, managing director of LuLu Group International; Bavaguthu Raghuram Shetty, CEO and managing director of NMC Health and UAE Exchange.

The 2013 event also unveiled OneAsia2020, with a keynote address by one of its proponents, Thaksin Shinawatra, former Prime Minister of Thailand.

The leadership event series marked its tenth anniversary on 22 November 2017, once more at the Armani Hotel in Dubai. It honoured Sheikha Fatima bint Mubarak, chairwoman of the General Women's Union and the Family Development Foundation of the UAE, and president of the Supreme Council for Motherhood and Childhood.

On 3 March 2019, the ABLF launched a special-edition magazine in partnership with Gulf News. Dedicated to the Year of Tolerance, the magazine features leaders and stories from across Asia. These include Ratan Tata, chairman of Tata Trusts India; N.R. Narayana Murthy, founder of Infosys; Gopichand Hinduja, co-chairman of the Hinduja Group of Companies; Kiran Mazumdar Shaw, chairperson and managing director of Biocon; Mohammed Ahmed bin Abdul Aziz Al Shihhi, undersecretary of the Ministry of Economy; Reem Al Hashimy, Minister of State for International Cooperation and director general of Expo 2020; and Maitha bint Salem Al Shamsi, Minister of State.

In 2019, in partnership with CNBC Arabia, Malini N. Menon launched the ABLF Talks TV series, featuring Asian government and business leaders in three-minute episodes across six leadership themes.

=== Dubai Cares ===
IEDEA serves as a strategic partner to Dubai Cares, which works towards providing children and young people in developing countries access to quality education through the design and funding of programmes.

=== World Government Summit ===
IEDEA has served as advisor and outreach lartner to the World Government Summit since 2014. The summit is a knowledge-exchange platform that brings together 150 governments and international organisations.

=== Dubai Investment Week ===
IEDEA serves as advisor and outreach partner to the Dubai Investment Week. The event is attended by high-level investors, policymakers, and entrepreneurs looking for growth opportunities and expansion in Dubai.

=== National Program for Happiness and Wellbeing ===
IEDEA serves as advisor and outreach partner for the UAE's National Program for Happiness and Wellbeing, which aims to establish happiness and wellbeing as a lifestyle in the UAE.

=== Mohammed bin Rashid Centre for Government Innovation ===
IEDEA serves as outreach partner for the Mohammed bin Rashid Centre for Government Innovation, which aims to make innovation a key pillar of the UAE government.

=== In Celebration of Legendary Friendship ===
India and the UAE: In Celebration of a Legendary Friendship is a coffee-table book authored by Venu Rajamony, former Indian Consul-General in Dubai. It traces the history between the two countries, detailing political ties, business relations, and social sector engagements. It features a message from Mohammed bin Rashid Al Maktoum and a foreword by Nahayan Mabarak Al Nahayan, the UAE's Minister for Higher Education and Scientific Research.

India and Oman: a Legacy of Goodwill is the second edition of the ICLF Series.

=== India-UAE Knowledge Forum ===
The India-UAE Knowledge Forum is a joint venture between IEDEA and the Rajen Kilachand Knowledge Foundation to establish potential areas of cooperation between India and the UAE. According to Malini N. Menon, "We are particularly interested in creating and nurturing a sustainable forum that explores public–private partnership in Education & HRD in the context of the exciting changes taking in both the UAE and India."

Prathap C. Reddy, chairman of Apollo Hospitals Group, after receiving the ABLF Lifetime Achievement Award, said, "This forum has truly demonstrated the power of the term—Stronger Together—and shows the true spirit of emerging Asia—cohesive, collaborative and most importantly visionary".

=== Asian Business Awards Middle East ===
The Asian Business Awards Middle East 2007 was created by IEDEA, Axis International Group, and Real Media (part of the Zee Network). It recognised and rewarded pioneering business personalities that have "blazed new trails and set new benchmarks" in the Middle East business world. The criteria for each nomination category were set by PricewaterhouseCoopers. The event was hosted by Riz Khan.

=== OneAsia2020 ===
On 20 December 2013, Thaksin Shinawatra, former Prime Minister of Thailand, formed the OneAsia2020 initiative, in partnership with the ABLF Series, in the hope of fostering diplomacy in the region and laying the groundwork to solve some of Asia's biggest social and political issues.

=== Images of Success ===
The Images of Success series compiles stories of high-achieving Asian business professionals.
