= Anantara Siam Bangkok Hotel =

- Interactive map of the Anantara Siam Bangkok Hotel area
- Hotel chain: Anantara Hotels & Resorts

General information
- Location: 155 Ratchadamri Road, Lumphini, Pathum Wan, Bangkok, Thailand
- Coordinates: 13.7410°N 100.5402°E
- Opening: 1978; 48 years ago
- Owner: Minor Hotels

Other information
- Number of rooms: 354
- Number of restaurants: 8

Website
- anantara.com/en/siam-bangkok

The Anantara Siam Bangkok Hotel is a luxury hotel located in the Ratchadamri area in the Pathum Wan District of central Bangkok. Formerly known as the Four Seasons Bangkok, it is situated opposite the Royal Bangkok Sports Club. The hotel is part of the Anantara Hotels & Resorts brand under Minor Hotels.

== History ==
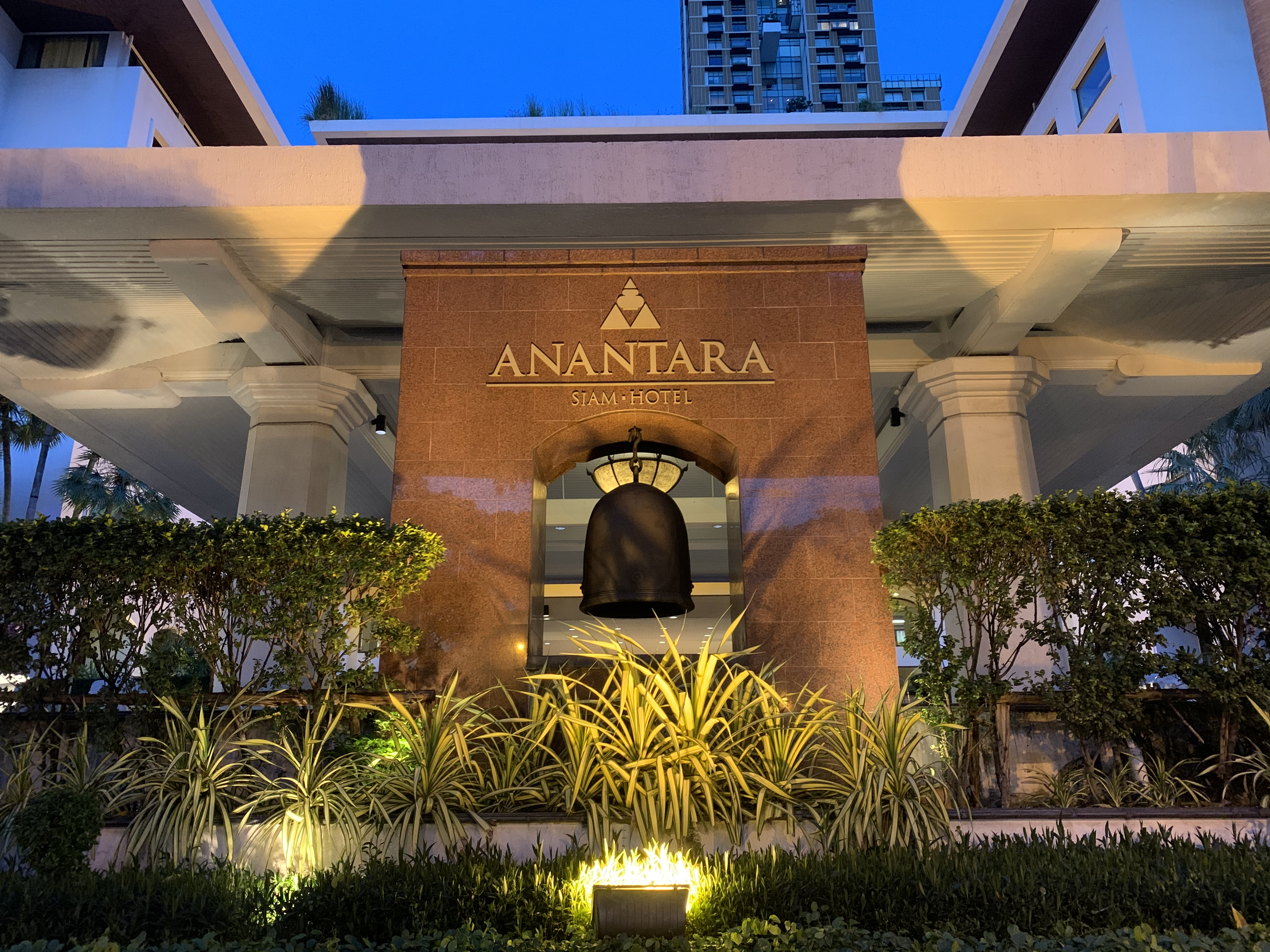
The bell at the entrance to the Anantara Siam Bangkok Hotel from the Ratchadamri Road

Initially constructed in 1978 as a Peninsula hotel, it was sold to Regent Hotels & Resorts in 1982. Thereafter, Four Seasons undertook the management of the hotel until it was reacquired by Regent in 1992. It was briefly named the Regent Bangkok following its acquisition by Minor Hotels in 2001, but was renamed as the Four Seasons Bangkok in 2003.

On March 1, 2015, with the aim of creating a flagship Anantara hotel in the center of Bangkok, Minor Hotels rebranded it as the Anantara Siam Bangkok Hotel

== Corporate activities ==
- Anantara Siam Bangkok Hotel, formerly known as the Four Seasons Hotel Bangkok, in association with the Thai Red Cross Society, has held a charity run for over 20 years in order to raise funds for research projects conducted by the Hematological Cancer Research Center at King Chulalongkorn Memorial Hospital. The event is in partnership with Minor International and the Embassy of Canada to Thailand. The run is held within the premises of Bangkok's Lumphini Park. The Cancer Care Charity Fun Run of 2014, which was held for the seventh consecutive time in conjunction with sister properties Four Seasons Resort Chiang Mai and Four Seasons Resort Koh Samui, was able to raise 3.5 million baht in donations.
- The World Gourmet Festival is an annual event held at Anantara Siam Bangkok Hotel. Proceeds from the festival go towards the HRH Princess Soamsawali's "Save A Child's Life from AIDS" project. The festival sees the participation of many international chefs, winemakers, and food experts.
