= List of airlines of Thailand =

This is a list of airlines currently operating in Thailand holding Air Operator Certificates (AOC) issued by the Civil Aviation Authority of Thailand (CAAT)

== Scheduled airlines ==
Airline	Image	IATA	ICAO	Callsign	Type	Alliance	Founded	Commenced operations	Fleet	Notes
Bangkok Airways		PG	BKP	BANGKOK AIR	Regional	None	1968	1986	27	Founded as Sahakol Air and commenced operations in 1986 as Bangkok Airways.
Nok Air		DD	NOK	NOK AIR	Low-cost	Value Alliance	2004	2004	14	Subsidiary of Nok Airlines Public Company Limited
Really Cool Airlines		-	-	-		none	2025	-	Plans for 3	Planned for 2026
Thai AirAsia		FD	AIQ	THAI ASIA	Low-cost	None	2003	2004	62	Subsidiary of Asia Aviation Public Company Limited
Thai AirAsia X		XJ	TAX	EXPRESS WING	Long-haul; Low-cost	None	2013	2014	10	Subsidiary of Asia Aviation Public Company Limited
Thai Airways International		TG	THA	THAI	Full-service; Flag carrier	Star Alliance	1960	1988	79	Founded in 1960, merged with Thai Airways Company's domestic operations in 1988. Founding member of Star Alliance
Thai Lion Air		SL	TLM	MENTARI	Low-cost	None	2013	2013	28	Subsidiary of Lion Air
Thai VietJet Air		VZ	TVJ	THAIVIET JET	Low-cost	None	2014	2015	18	Subsidiary of VietJet Air
Ezy Airlines		-	EZT	THAI EZY	Regional	None	2024	2025		Operate both scheduled and charter routes exclusively in Southern Thailand.

== Charter airlines ==
Airline	Image	IATA	ICAO	Callsign	Founded	Commenced operations	Notes
MJets			MJJ	SPEEDY	2007	2010	Private jet services
Siam Land Flying					1991		Private jet services

== Cargo airlines ==
Airline	Image	IATA	ICAO	Callsign	Founded	Commenced operations	Fleet	Notes
Air People International		3D	APG	AIR PEOPLE	1986			
K-Mile Air		8K	KMI	KAY-MILE AIR	2004	2006	7	

== See also ==
- List of airlines
- List of defunct airlines of Thailand
- List of airports in Thailand
- Busiest airports in Thailand
- List of defunct airlines of Asia

== Bibliography ==
- Lumholdt N.-Warren W., The history of aviation in Thailand, Travel Publishing Asia Ltd., Hong Kong, 1987
- Young E.M., Aerial nationalism-History of aviation in Thailand, Smithsonian Institution Press, Washington (D.C.), 1995
- Darke S.M.-Vannukul V., Royal orchid-The history of civil aviation in Thailand, Air Britain Historians, U.K.
