= Minor International =

Multinational company based in Bangkok, Thailand

- Type: Public
- Traded as: SET: MINT
- ISIN: TH0128B10Z09
- Industry: Hospitality; Restaurants; Retail
- Predecessor: Royal Garden Resort Co., Ltd.
- Founded: 1978; 48 years ago
- Founder: William Heinecke
- Headquarters: Bangkok, Thailand
- Number of locations: 550 hotels and serviced suites (2023); 2,642 restaurant outlets (2023); 286 retail trading outlets (2023)
- Area served: Worldwide
- Key people: William Heinecke; (Chairman); Dillip Rajakarier; (CEO)
- Revenue: ▲ ฿153.486 billion (2023)
- Net income: ▲ ฿7.132 billion (2023)
- Total assets: ▲ ฿359.196 billion (2023)
- Number of employees: 78,000 (2023)
- Subsidiaries: Minor Hotels; Minor Food; Minor Lifestyle
- Website: minor.com

Minor International is a Thai multi-national company based in Bangkok, Thailand. The three core businesses of Minor International are hospitality, restaurants, and lifestyle brands distribution, operated under subsidiary companies Minor Hotels, Minor Food, and Minor Lifestyle, respectively.

Minor Hotels is a hotel owner, operator, and investor with a portfolio of over 550 hotels under the brands of Anantara Hotels & Resorts, Avani Hotels & Resorts, Elewana Collection, Oaks Hotels, Resorts & Suites, NH Hotels, NH Collection, nhow Hotels, and Tivoli Hotels & Resorts in over 55 countries across Asia-Pacific, the Middle East, Africa, the Indian Ocean, Europe, and the Americas.

Minor Food is one of Asia's largest restaurant companies with over 2,600 outlets operating system-wide in 26 countries under a selection of brands, including The Pizza Company, The Coffee Club, Thai Express, Riverside and Benihana, alongside franchise and joint-venture operations under the Swensen's, Sizzler, Dairy Queen, Burger King and BreadTalk brands. The company’s inception can be traced back to Bill Heinicke’s founding of Minor Food by opening a pizza shop.

Minor Lifestyle is one of the largest distributors of lifestyle brands in Thailand with a portfolio of international brands, such as Brooks Brothers, Esprit, Bossini, Etam, OVS, Radley, Anello, Charles & Keith, Pedro, Zwilling J.A. Henckels, Joseph Joseph, and Minor Smart Kids, as well as a footprint of over 470 retail outlets.

== History ==
Minor International was founded in 1978 as Royal Garden Resort Co., Ltd. with an initial capital of three million baht. The company was listed on the Stock Exchange of Thailand (SET) on 14 August 1988. In late 2004, the company completed the acquisition of 100 percent of The Minor Food Group PCL, and followed this in January 2005 with its de-listing from the SET.

In 2006, Anantara entered Dubai at The Palm Jumeirah. In 2008, William Heinecke acquired 70 percent of Thai Express, 50 percent of The Coffee Club, and 50 percent of Elewana Afrika for US$12 million. That same year, he opened the Desert Islands Resort & Spa by Anantara on Sir Bani Yas Island in Abu Dhabi.

On June 12, 2009, the company completed a business restructuring plan with Minor Corporation (MINOR). As a result, the company has, directly and indirectly, owned 99.92 percent of MINOR's equity interest. On 22 June 2009, MINOR was delisted from SET.

In July 2011, Minor International completed a compulsory acquisition and purchased most of the shares of Oaks Hotels, Resorts & Suites, expanding its presence in Australia, New Zealand, and Dubai with a portfolio of 36 serviced suites.

== Businesses ==
Minor International operates three main businesses:

1. Hotels and mixed-use
2. Restaurants
3. Retail trading and contract manufacturing

=== Hotels and mixed-use ===
Minor Hotels has over 550 hotels and serviced suites with over 80,000 rooms in its portfolio. The hotel business can be divided into four categories:

- Owned hotels
- Joint venture hotels
- Managed hotels
- Management of serviced suites

Hotel-related businesses include:

- Spa business
- Plaza and entertainment business
- Residential property development business
- Points-based timeshare project

=== Restaurants ===
Through its subsidiary, Minor Food, Minor International has one of the largest quick-service restaurant operations in Asia, with over 2,600 restaurant outlets in Thailand, the Middle East, Asia, and Australia. In 2022, the company fully acquired London's Corbin & King restaurant group, which includes The Wolsely, and rebranded it as The Wolsely Hospitality Group.

=== Retail trading ===
Minor International operates its retail trading and contract manufacturing business through Minor Corporation PCL, now Minor Lifestyle, the group's consumer lifestyle company. Minor Lifestyle is a distributor of international lifestyle consumer brands in Thailand, focusing primarily on fashion, cosmetics, and household products through retail, wholesale, and direct marketing channels.
