= Nishita =

Nishita can be a feminine given name or a surname. Notable people with the name include:

== Given name ==
- Nishita Barua, Bangladeshi singer-songwriter and entrepreneur
- Nishita Goswami, Indian actress
- Nishita Nirmal Mhatre, Indian judge
- Nishita Akter Nishi (born 2008), Bangladeshi cricketer
- Nishita Shah, Thai businesswoman

== Surname ==
- Mark Ramos Nishita, American musician
- Satoru Nishita, American landscape architect
- Tomoyuki Nishita, professor at the University of Tokyo
