= Malini N. Menon =

Indian businesswoman

- Born: 13 March 1965 (age 61)
- Citizenship: India
- Occupations: Founder and Managing Director, IEDEA
- Children: 2

Malini N. Menon is an Indian entrepreneur based in the United Arab Emirates. She is the Founder and managing director of IEDEA, (formerly known as Indian Expressions), a business ideation and network facilitation agency engaged in the IP development of branded business events and PR initiatives that are focused on sustainable investor outreach and acquisition, located in Jumeirah Lake Towers, under the DMCC Free Zone, Dubai, UAE.

Since 2015, Menon has been involved with several initiatives of the UAE government. She also contributes to the initiatives of the Dubai Women Establishment and serves as Advisor across multiple editions of the Global Women's Forum Dubai. In 2019, in partnership with CNBC Arabiya, Menon launched the ABLF Talks TV series featuring Asian government and business leaders in 3-minute episodes across six leadership themes.

== Career ==
In 2007, she founded Indian Expressions, now called IEDEA.

In May 2010, The India-UAE Knowledge Forum, a joint venture by Menon's company IEDEA and the Rajen Kilachand Knowledge Foundation, was established, through which the potential areas of cooperation between India and UAE are discussed.

Menon's work in promoting Asian ties between the Indian Subcontinent, the Middle East and the Far East has been commended by H.H. Sheikh Nahayan Mabarak Al-Nahayan, Minister of Culture, Youth and Community Development, UAE; H.E. Sultan bin Saeed Al Mansouri, Minister of Economy, UAE; H.E. Sheikh Fahad bin Mohammad bin Jabor Al-Thani, chairman of the Board of Directors of Doha Bank, Qatar; H.E. Khalil Abdullah Al Khonji, Chairman of the Federation of GCC Chambers and Chairman of the Oman Chamber of Commerce and Industry; Oman; and Dr Amer bin Awadh Al Rawas, CEO of Omantel, Oman, among others.
