= NH Hotel Group =

Multinational hotel chain

- Type: Public
- Traded as: BMAD: NHH
- Industry: Hospitality
- Founded: 1978; 48 years ago
- Headquarters: Madrid, Spain
- Area served: Worldwide
- Parent: Minor Hotels
- Website: nh-hotels.com

NH Hotel Group, currently known as Minor Hotels Europe & Americas, was a Spanish multinational hotel company founded in 1978 with headquarters in Madrid. NH Hotels ("Navarra Hotels") was born in Pamplona and its hotels were located mainly in Europe and Latin America. The group marketed the NH, NH Collection and nhow brands.

In 2018, NH Hotel Group became part of Minor Hotels, a global leader in the hospitality industry, with more than 640 hotels, resorts, and branded residences in operation and under development across over 65 countries, and it also began operating the Anantara, Avani, and Tivoli brands in Europe and the Americas.

== Operations ==
Minor Hotels operates a portfolio of hotel brands, which today total 12 and include: Anantara, Elewana Collection, The Wolseley Hotels, Tivoli, Minor Reserve Collection, NH Collection, nhow, Avani, Colbert Collection, NH Hotels, Oaks, and iStay by NH.

Minor Hotels operates as a subsidiary of Minor International, one of the largest hospitality and leisure companies in the Asia-Pacific region.

== Corporate information ==
Since 2018, NH Hotel Group is part of Minor Hotels, an international hotel owner, operator, and investor headquartered in Bangkok, Thailand, with more than 550 hotels in over 55 countries across Asia-Pacific, the Middle East, Africa, the Indian Ocean, Europe, and the Americas.

NH Hotel Group is listed on the Madrid Stock Exchange, where the shares of NH Hotel Group is a constituent of the Madrid Stock Exchange General Index. The shares are also traded on the OTC Market.

== Notable historical milestones ==
- 1978: It opened its first property, Hotel Ciudad de Pamplona, in Navarre.
- 1982: Four years later, the company opened its first hotel outside Navarre, NH Calderón in Barcelona, marking the beginning of its nationwide expansion, which intensified during the 1980s.
- 1988: Corporación Financiera Reunida, S.A. (COFIR) became the reference shareholder.
- 1996: Grupo De Benedetti exited the shareholder structure and COFIR acquired 100% of NH’s capital.
- 1997: It was listed on the Madrid Stock Exchange under the name NH Hoteles.
- 1998: The company launched its first website www.nh-hotels.com and expanded into Latin America.
- 1999: It began its expansion in Europe with the acquisition of a stake in the Italian hotel chain Jolly Hotels (19.1%). That same year, the company’s growth—which brought its total to 88 hotels in Spain alone—enabled it to join the IBEX 35, Spain’s main stock index. Also, during that year, it acquired 91.5% of Sotogrande, one of the most exclusive residential developments in southern Spain.
- 2000: It doubled in size by acquiring the Dutch hotel chain Krasnapolsky. The company became Europe’s third-largest business hotel chain, with a presence in 15 markets, 168 hotels, and more than 7,000 professionals. Portugal was immediately added to these markets.
- 2001: It acquired the Mexican hotel chain Chartwell, adding 14 properties to the group’s portfolio, and that same year decided to unify all its hotels under a single brand, NH Hoteles.
- 2002: It acquired the German hotel chain Astron Hotels, which contributed 46 hotels in Germany, 6 in Austria, and 1 in Switzerland.
- 2004: It entered new international markets for the first time, including Italy, Romania, the United Kingdom, and France.
- 2006: It achieved leadership in the Italian market following the acquisition of Framon and 100% of Jolly Hotels. It opened its first nhow hotel in Milan, giving rise to a new category of disruptive hotels aimed at a forward-looking, sophisticated, and open-minded audience.
- 2007: NH Hoteles operated 341 hotels in 21 countries across three continents.
- 2009: NH Hoteles and the Spanish chain Hesperia signed an agreement to integrate their hotel management businesses, with NH going on to manage 51 hotels owned or operated by Hesperia. That same year, the company created Coperama, a purchasing cooperation platform aimed at improving competitiveness across the sector.
