= The Pizza Company =

Thai restaurant chain

The Pizza Company เดอะ พิซซ่า คอมปะนี

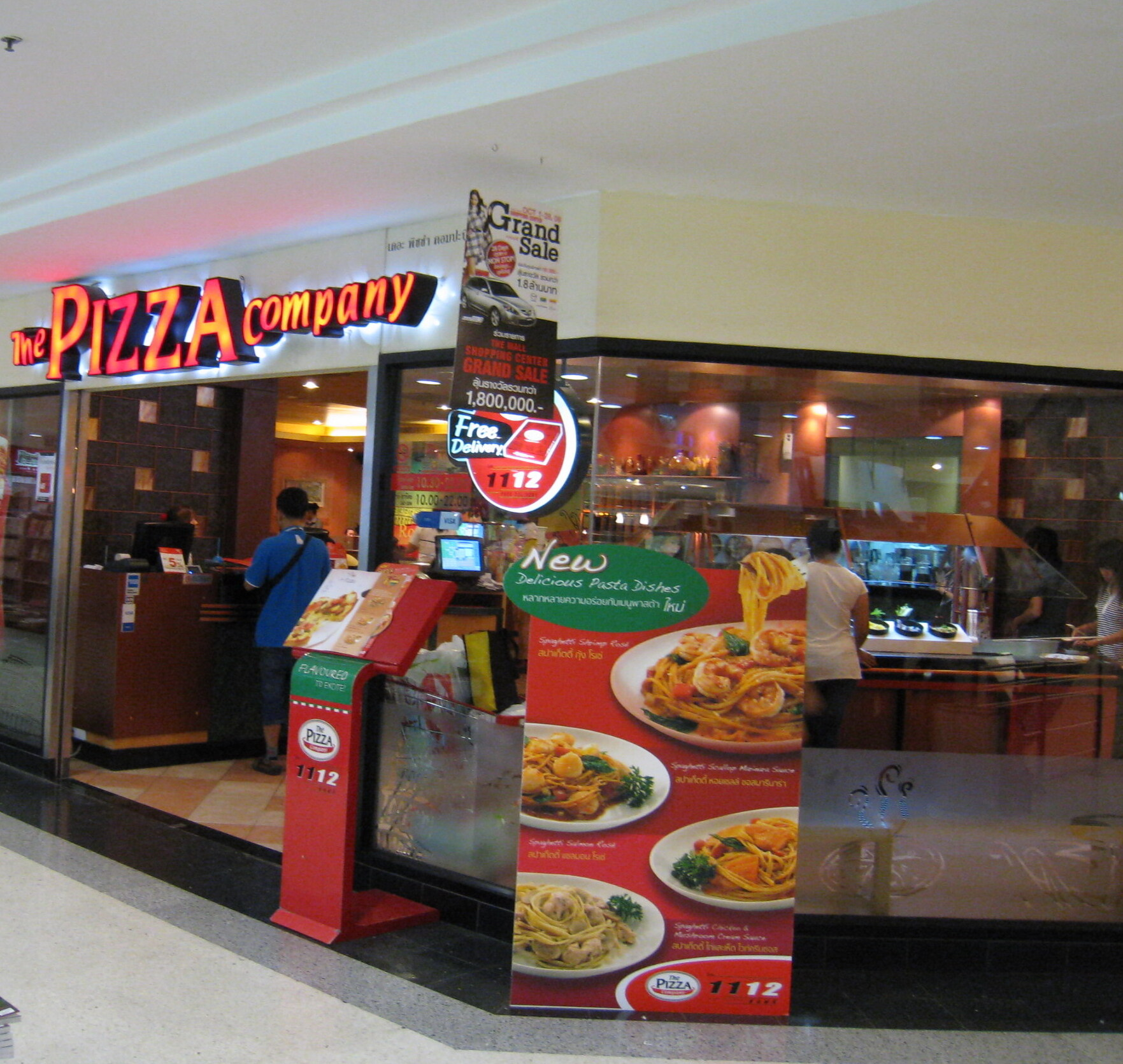
- Storefront in 2008
- Type: Private
- Industry: Foodservice
- Founded: 1980; 46 years ago (launched own brand in 17 March 2001)
- Headquarters: Bangkok, Thailand
- Number of locations: 564 (2023)
- Area served: Thailand; China; Cambodia; Saudi Arabia; United Arab Emirates; Bahrain; Jordan; Laos; Vietnam; Malaysia; Myanmar; Maldives; Egypt
- Products: Italian-American cuisine (pizza • pasta • chicken • french fries • rice dishes • steaks • salads • desserts)
- Revenue: ฿5.11 billion (2011)
- Parent: Minor Food Group (1981–2006); Minor International (2006–present)
- Website: 1112.com/th

The Pizza Company (Thai: เดอะ พิซซ่า คอมปะนี) is a Thai multinational pizza restaurant chain and international franchise founded in 1980 in Bangkok, Thailand, by William Heinecke. The brand was officially launched in 2001 after Minor International rebranded its existing Pizza Hut stores, and it quickly dominated the Thai market. Managed by Minor Food Group, the company operates 597 stores across nine countries, primarily through franchise agreements in Southeast Asia and the Middle East. The menu features Italian-American cuisine like pizza and pasta alongside localized dishes, such as the Tom Yum Goong Pizza in Thailand. The brand is widely known in its home market for its "Buy 1 Get 1 Free" promotions and a 20-minute delivery guarantee, which popularized its "1112" hotline.

== History ==
The Pizza Company opened a branch in Thailand, it was founded by Minor International, led by William E. Heinecke. The brand’s origins trace back to 1980, when Minor International acquired the master franchise of Thailand for Pizza Hut and had later taken the chain up to more than one hundred stores, making it the top pizza market back at the time.

In 1999, the parent of Pizza Hut, Tricon Global Restaurants did not renew the franchise rights with Minor International and initiated a direct operation in Thailand. Minor International continued to operate its own outlets, equipment, and staff, with nearly two decades of experience in managing pizza operations, it helped the company set up a new brand easily.

In 2001, Minor International opened The Pizza Company by rebranding nearly one hundred Pizza Hut locations. The company quickly increased its target in less than 45 days, and in a few years, The Pizza Company had taken market share from Pizza Hut. To this date, it dominates the pizza market of Thailand with a share of close to 60%.

In 2004, The Pizza Company began to expand and franchise internationally and today the restaurant has franchises in Jordan, the United Arab Emirates, Saudi Arabia, Laos, China, Bahrain, Myanmar and Cambodia. There are also multiple locations in Vietnam, especially in Ho Chi Minh City.

The Pizza Company is currently the largest pizza restaurant chain in Thailand.

== International operations ==
The Pizza Company operates outside Thailand primarily through master-franchise agreements across Southeast Asia and the Middle East. According to owner Minor Food, as of 31 December 2024 the brand had 597 outlets across nine countries: Thailand, Vietnam, Cambodia, Myanmar, Laos, United Arab Emirates, Saudi Arabia, Bahrain, and the Maldives.

In Vietnam, the brand entered the market in 2013 and reports 70+ restaurants nationwide operated by local franchise Pizza Ngon JSC. In Cambodia, Myanmar, and Laos, operations are run by EFG (Express Food Group) as Minor Food’s appointed master franchise partner for those territories.

The Pizza Company is present in Saudi Arabia, Bahrain and the UAE under franchise arrangements, some franchise partner materials also reference Oman among active or target markets.

Overall expansion continues under Minor Food’s franchise-led strategy to increase international exposure across its restaurant portfolio.

Country	First opening	Cities
Thailand	1981	Nationwide
China	2004	Beijing, Shanghai
Malaysia	2005	Kuala Lumpur, Penang, Sarawak, Malacca and Pahang
Cambodia	2006	Phnom Penh, Siem Reap, Battambang, Sihanoukville, and Kampong Cham
Saudi Arabia	2007	Ad-Dammam, Al-Khobar, Jeddah, Riyadh
United Arab Emirates	2007	Abu Dhabi-Dubai-Sharjah-Fujairah
Vietnam	2011	Nationwide
Laos	2011	Vientiane
Israel	2011	Rishon LeZion
Iran	2012	Tehran
Myanmar	2014	Yangon, Mandalay
Maldives	2017	Malé

== Products ==
The Pizza Company specializes in Italian-American cuisine, with pizza as its primary product. The chain offers a range of categories, including classic varieties such as pepperoni and ham with mushroom, as well as seafood-based options featuring shrimp, crab sticks, and other ingredients. One of its most notable localized products is the Tom Yum Goong Pizza, which combines elements of the traditional Thai hot and sour soup with pizza toppings. Customers may choose from different crust types, including thin, thick, and stuffed-crust variations.

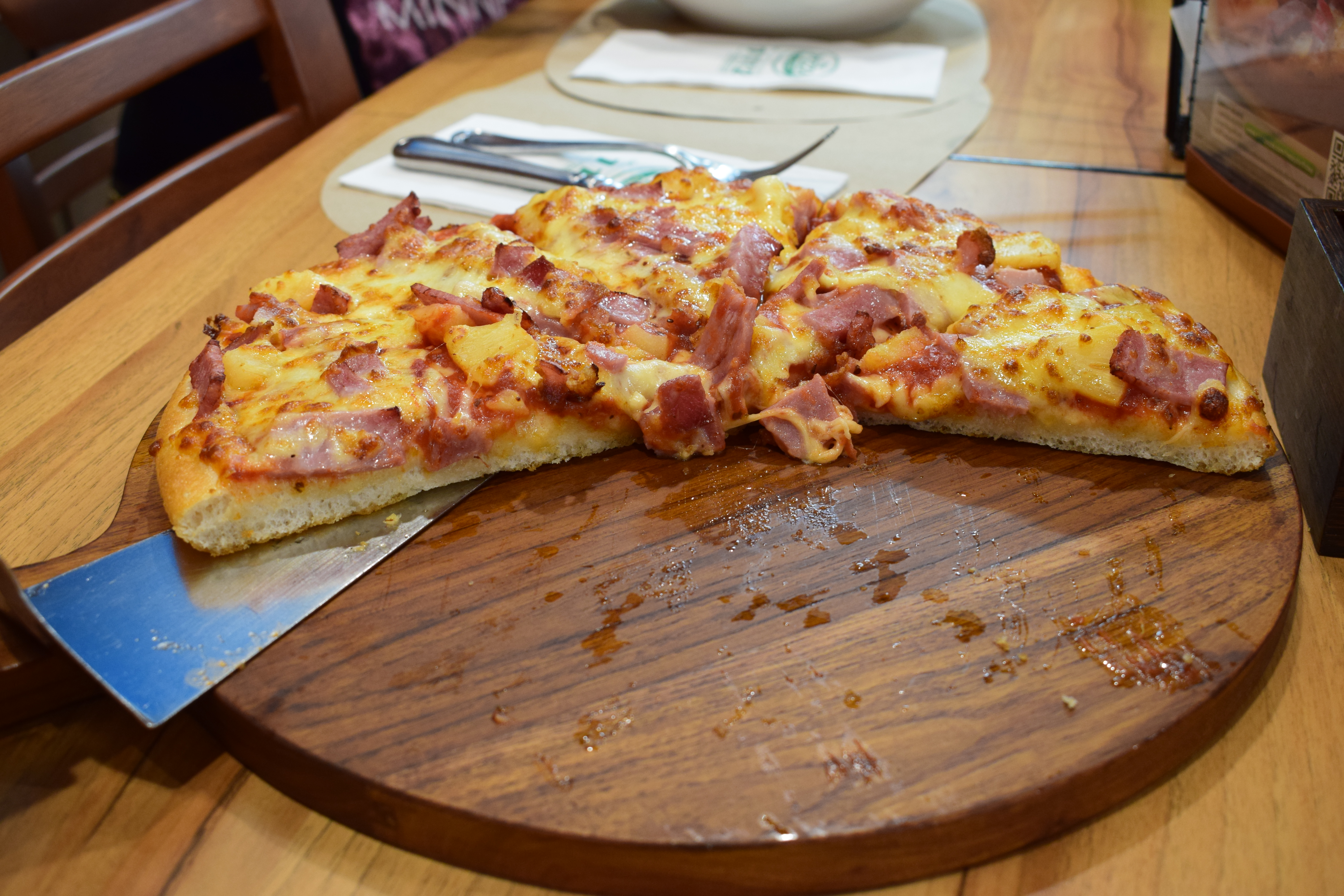
The Pizza Company's Hawaiian Pizza

Beyond pizza, the menu includes pasta dishes such as spaghetti carbonara, spaghetti with meat sauce, and localized versions like spicy stir-fried spaghetti. Chicken is also a core part of the menu, with items such as barbecued wings, fried chicken wings influenced by Korean cuisine, and chicken tenders. Side dishes include garlic bread, salads, French fries, and appetizer platters, which are often paired with pizzas in combination meals.

The brand also provides localized items to appeal to regional markets, particularly in Thailand and neighboring countries. In Thailand, regional offerings include rice bowls, such as spicy chicken or teriyaki grilled chicken served with rice, designed as quick meal options. Desserts like chocolate lava cake and ice cream, along with a variety of soft drinks, are also available.

In Vietnam, localized menu items reflect regional tastes and ingredients, featuring seafood-based pizzas such as the Pizza Hải Sản Pesto Xanh (Seafood Pesto Pizza) and Pizza Hải Sản Nhiệt Đới (Tropical Seafood Pizza). These adaptations demonstrate the company’s strategy of adapting international pizza concepts with local culinary influences.

In its international markets, including Cambodia, Saudi Arabia, and China, The Pizza Company adapts its product line to incorporate regional flavors while maintaining its core offerings.

== Franchises ==
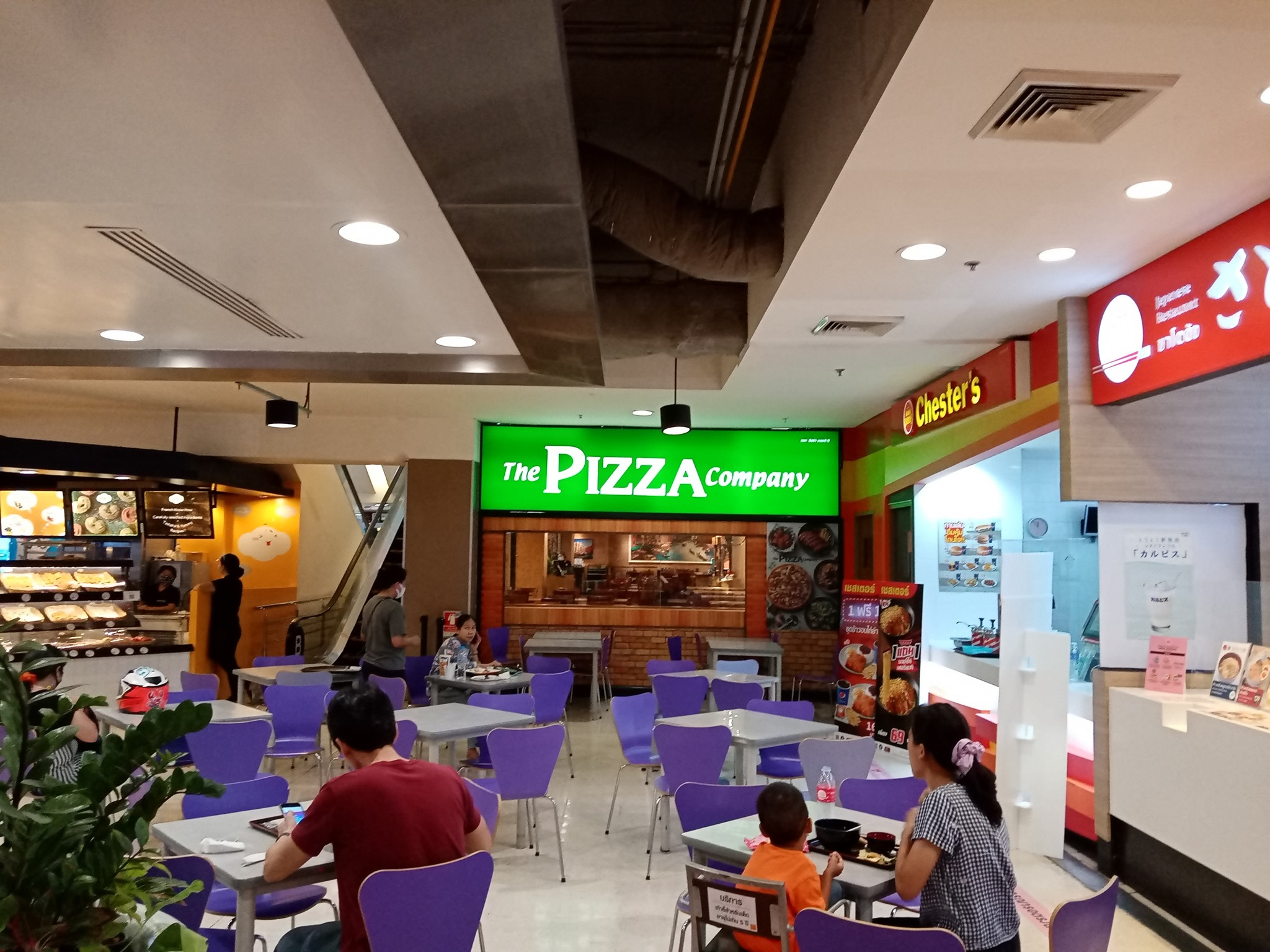
The Pizza Company in The Mall Tha Phra.

The Pizza Company operates under a franchise model managed by Minor Food Group, a subsidiary of Minor International Public Company Limited. The brand was first developed and launched in Thailand in 2001 and has since expanded through master franchise agreements into several international markets.

Outside Thailand, The Pizza Company has established a presence in multiple countries across Southeast Asia and the Middle East, including Vietnam, Cambodia, Laos, Myanmar, Malaysia, the United Arab Emirates, and Saudi Arabia. Each market adapts the menu and marketing approach to local consumer preferences while maintaining the brand’s core identity and operational standards.

Franchise operations are typically managed by local partners under license from Minor Food Group, which provides brand guidelines, training, and supply chain support. The company’s international expansion strategy focuses on markets with growing urban populations and increasing demand.

== Advertising and marketing ==
Rebranded logo in 2023

The company was also among the first pizza chains in Thailand to introduce a delivery guarantee, promising order delivery within 20 minutes. This policy helped position The Pizza Company as a market leader in quick-service dining and reinforced its hotline number 1112 as part of the brand identity. The number is prominently featured across advertisements, packaging, and storefronts.

Over time, The Pizza Company has adapted its marketing to appeal to younger demographics, particularly through digital and social media platforms. Recent rebranding efforts have modernized the logo and restaurant design to create a more contemporary and “Instagram-friendly” aesthetic. The company has also engaged in brand collaborations and special menu launches aimed at maintaining visibility among younger consumers.

== See also ==
- Minor International
- Fast food restaurant
- List of Italian restaurants
