= Holly Fulton =

Scottish designer (born 1977)

- Born: 1977 (age 47–48); Scotland, United Kingdom
- Education: Edinburgh College of Art; Royal College of Art
- Label: Holly Fulton

Holly Fulton (born 1977) is a Scottish designer who set up her eponymous fashion label in 2009. Known for bold graphic and 3D motifs, innovative use of textiles and distinctive accessories, she has been described as the "queen of prints". She is a regular at London Fashion Week and has also appeared at Hong Kong Fashion Week.

== Early life and career ==
Fulton was born in Edinburgh. Her early ambition was to be a vet, but after studying sciences at school she switched focus and completed an art foundation course in Newcastle and a fashion textiles degree at Edinburgh College of Art, graduating in 1999. After university, she worked for a while at London fashion store Koh Samui before spending a number of years teaching, running a gallery and working as a nanny. In 2005, she applied for the MA in fashion led by Wendy Dagworthy at Royal College of Art. She gained experience at Lanvin in Paris before establishing her label which was launched at Fashion East in 2009. Holly was appointed as Head of Fashion at the Cambridge School of Visual and Performing Arts (CSVPA) in 2017.

=== Design awards ===
In 2009, Holly Fulton won both the Swarovski award for emerging talent and the Scottish young designer of the year award. In 2010, she won the Elle next young designer award. She was a British Fashion Council NEWGEN award winner in 2010, which gave her access to industry mentors and financial backing for two seasons, becoming a Fashion Forward winner in 2013. In 2020, Holly was recognised by The Fashion Awards for setting up the Emergency Designer Network in response to the COVID-19 pandemic.

Holly Fulton is among the London fashion businesses to have been assisted by the London-based business incubator Centre for Fashion Enterprise.

== Holly Fulton label ==
Holly Fulton designs feature luxurious fabrics, often with Art Deco and retro-inspired prints. The label is also known for its use of decorative embellishments, often in unusual materials, such as perspex and crystal. Women's Wear Daily has noted how the designer often combines: "several disparate sources of inspiration". The autumn 2014 show, for instance, featured calculators, cogs and other technology-inspired motifs.

=== Collaborations ===
Holly Fulton has collaborated with Radley to produce a capsule collection of bags. She also produced four limited-edition pieces for eBay to promote autumn/winter (AW) 2013 London Fashion Week.
