= Sizzler =

American restaurant chain

Sizzler USA Restaurants, Inc.
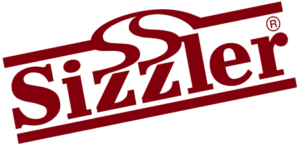

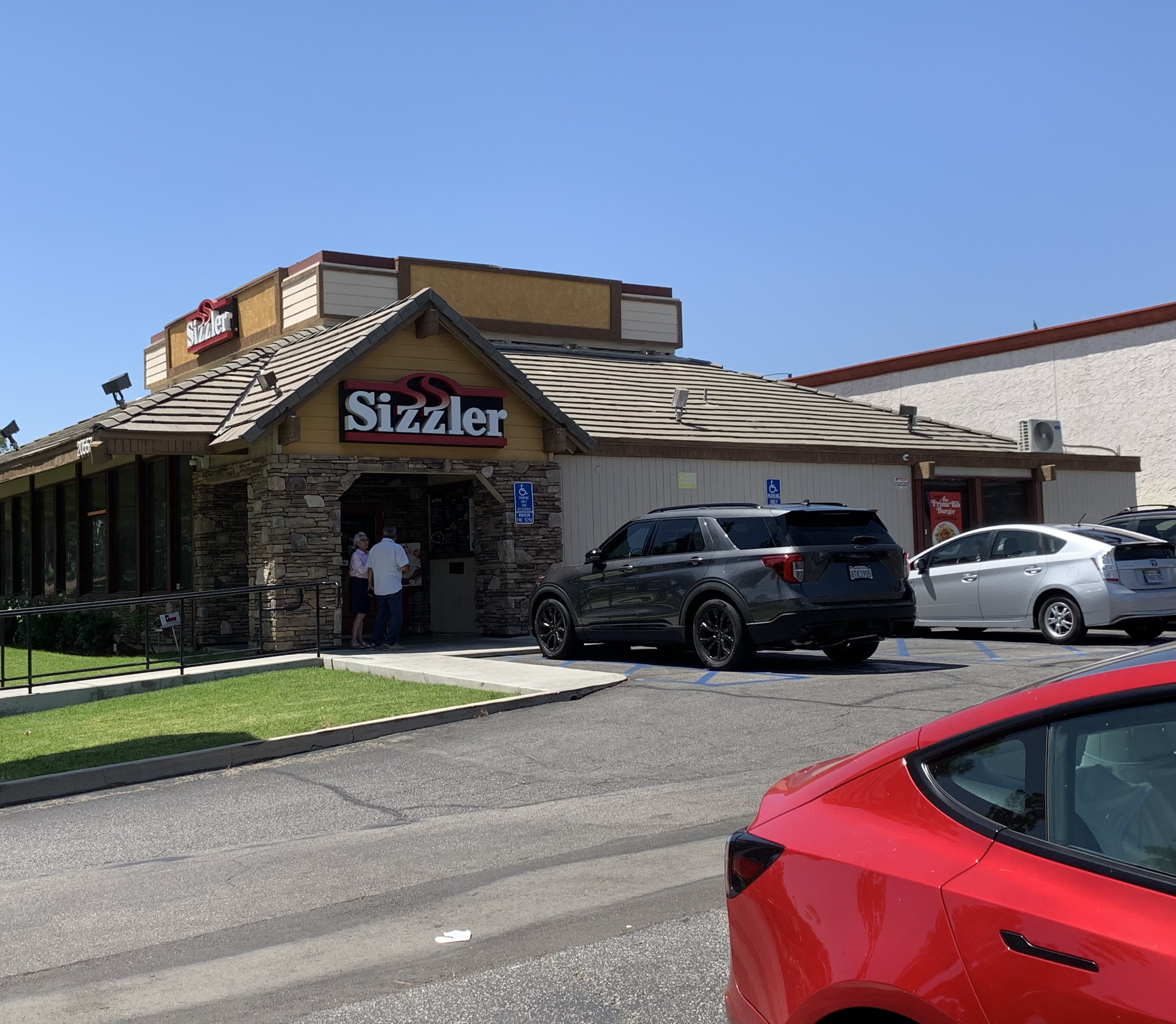
- Sizzler in Los Angeles
- Trade name: Sizzler
- Type: Private
- Industry: Restaurants
- Founded: 1958; 68 years ago in Culver City, California, as Del's Sizzler Family Steak House
- Founders: Del and Helen Johnson
- Headquarters: Mission Viejo, California, U.S.
- Number of locations: 74 (2025)
- Area served: United States; Japan (Note: Not related to the American company); Thailand
- Key people: James A. Collins (CEO; 1967–1999); Christopher Perkins (CEO; 2019–present)
- Products: Steak, seafood, salads
- Owner: Management (United States); Royal Holdings Co., Ltd. (Japan); Minor International (Thailand)
- Website: www.sizzler.com

Sizzler USA Restaurants, Inc., doing business as Sizzler, is a United States-based restaurant chain with headquarters in Mission Viejo, California, with locations mainly in California, plus some in the nearby states of Arizona, Idaho, New Mexico, Oregon, and Utah, as well as Puerto Rico. It is known for steak, seafood, and salad bar items.

Since 2023, Sizzler restaurants outside of the United States are owned by Thailand-based Minor International and are not related to the American firm.

In September 2020, Sizzler USA filed for Chapter 11 bankruptcy due to the COVID-19 pandemic hurting sales. The bankruptcy filing does not affect the similarly named Minor International affiliated restaurants that are located outside of the United States. Sizzler USA emerged from bankruptcy in January 2023.

== History ==
Sizzler logo used from 1983 to 1996

The chain was founded in 1958 as Sizzler Family Steak House by Del and Helen Johnson in Culver City, California. At its peak, the chain was composed of more than 270 locations throughout the US. Another source claimed as many as 700 locations in the US during the 1990s. Most of Sizzler's US locations are in the West.

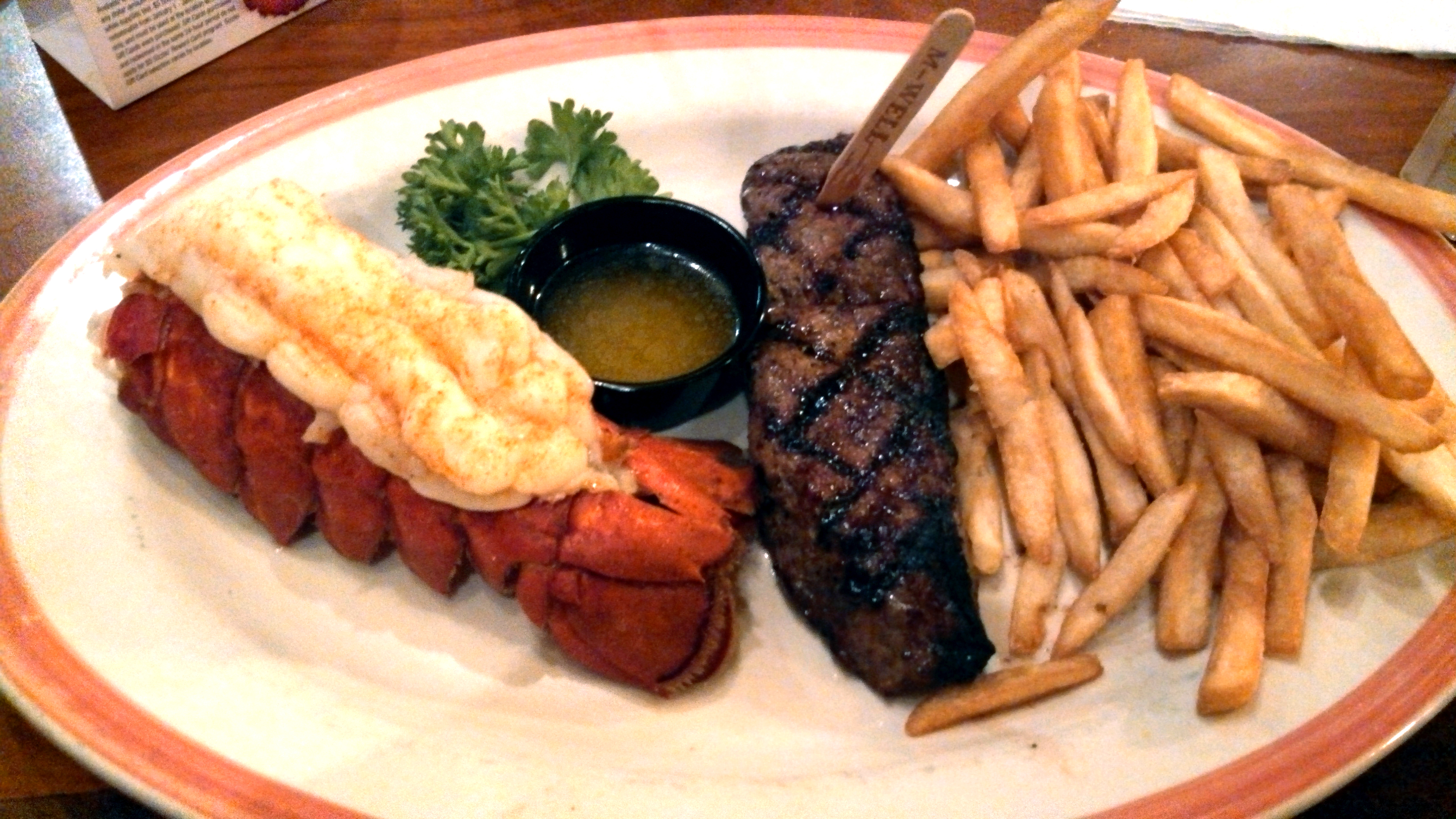
Steak and lobster with fries from Sizzler

In the late 1970s and early 1980s, Sizzler promoted steak and combination steak dinners with an optional salad bar. The restaurant wanted to give customers the feel of a full-service restaurant at a price slightly more than a fast food chain. To control costs, many restaurants had in-house meat cutters who would cut steaks and grind beef.

Sizzler in Westchester, California (2026)

Into the early to mid-1980s, competition appeared from Ponderosa Steakhouse and Bonanza Steakhouse. After promotions such as all-you-can-eat fried shrimp, the chain expanded its salad bar into a full buffet promoted as the "Buffet Court". Patrons began to use the buffet as a meal instead of an add-on to an entree. In response, Sizzler lowered the quality of other menu items. Customers took notice, and Sizzler's reputation suffered.

Sizzler filed for Chapter 11 bankruptcy in 1996 ("to escape costly leases on unprofitable restaurants"), and closed over 130 of its locations. The company reemerged from Chapter 11 in 1997. During the late 1990s, new management upgraded the quality of food and increased prices. 21 locations closed in 2001. Sizzler began an image makeover around 2002. A new restaurant concept was created, featuring a lighter and more open dining room. The changes were accompanied by a new menu. In an effort to return to its roots, Sizzler emphasized steaks, seafood, and the salad bar. While the all-you-can-eat buffet was phased out in some locations, it remained in others.

In the 1990s, Sizzler ran upscale locations with the Buffalo Ranch Steakhouse brand.

Sizzler was sold to Pacific Equity Partners, an Australian-based investment firm, in 2005. In January 2008, Sizzler announced it was planning to take action against the Multi-State Lottery Association over the use of the name "The Sizzler (Hot Lotto)".

In June 2011, Sizzler USA announced that a US management group led by the Sizzler CEO would buy the American portion of the chain of 178 restaurants from Pacific Equity Partners, with the remaining 100 restaurants located outside of the United States remaining with Pacific Equity Partners. The headquarters initially remained in Culver City, where the chain was founded, but moved to Mission Viejo in 2012.

Sizzler launched its "ZZ" food truck in 2012 to expand sales and test market new dishes.

In September 2020, Sizzler USA announced that it had filed for Chapter 11 bankruptcy protection, citing impacts of the COVID-19 pandemic, forcing it to temporarily close its restaurants' dining rooms. The company also cited problems paying rent. Most of the company-owned restaurants were located in areas of California with high COVID-19 infection rates that did not permit restaurants to partially reopen dining rooms in September 2020. At the time of the bankruptcy filing, Sizzler had 107 locations in 10 states, with all but one location (in Florida) in states west of the Rocky Mountains in addition to several locations in Puerto Rico. This number is down from the 134 locations in 2018.

Post-COVID, Sizzler is still in operation and is attempting to rebuild its business with renovations, a new menu, and an advertising campaign. By November 2025, Sizzler USA was reduced to 74 restaurants operating in six western states plus Puerto Rico.

== International locations ==
Following Sizzler USA's separation from Sizzler International in 2011, all locations outside the United States were operated or licensed by Australia-based Collins Foods. In 2023, Collins sold its Sizzler business and intellectual property to Thailand-based Minor International.

=== Current locations ===
==== Japan ====
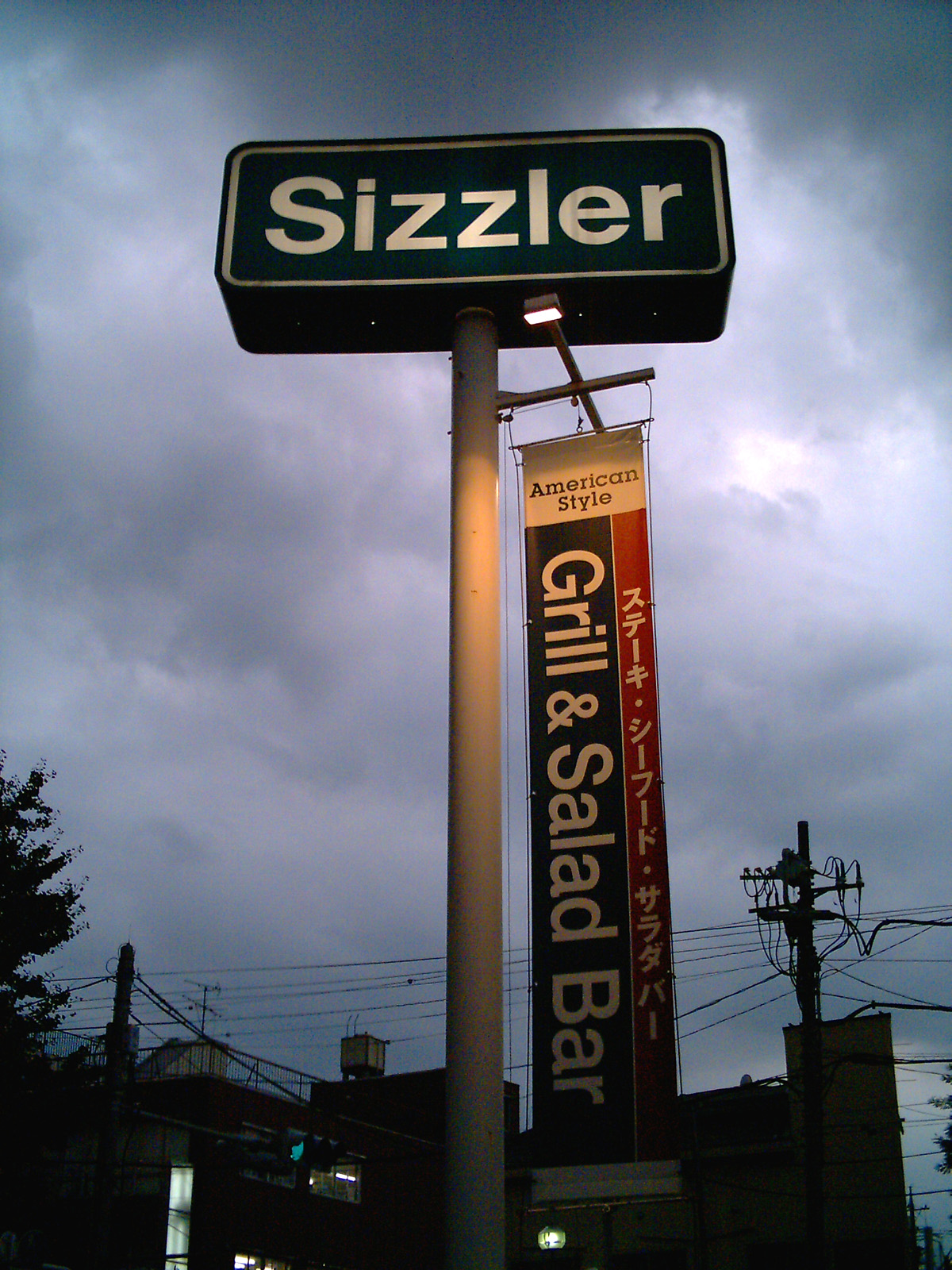
Sizzler in Musashino, Japan (2006)

The current Sizzler franchise-holder in Japan is Royal Holdings Co., Ltd., a Fukuoka-based food service company. Royal Holdings opened the first Japanese Sizzler steakhouse in 1991. By August 2021, Royal Holdings had 10 Sizzler restaurants in Japan.

==== Thailand ====
The current Sizzler franchise-holder in Thailand is Minor Food Group via a subsidiary called SLRT Limited. Minor opened its first Thai Sizzler steakhouse in 1996. By 2001, Minor had 19 Sizzler restaurants throughout Thailand.

During the COVID-19 pandemic, the company experimented with the use of robotic waiters in the dining room in December 2020 to minimize physical contact between customers and restaurant staff. After the Thai government loosened COVID-19 dine-in restrictions in September 2021, Sizzler Thailand was able to reopen 54 of its 60 restaurants for dine-in. Two months after reopening, the Thai franchise announced expansion plans of trying to open three to five new restaurants per year over the next three years. The franchise also announced plans of installing more robot food delivery systems within each restaurant, which would minimize contact between dine-in customers and restaurant staff, which would in turn lessen the potential transmission of COVID and other diseases.

In June 2023, Minor International became the sole trademark holder and the master franchiser for all Sizzler restaurants that are located outside of the United States.

By February 2026, Minor had 63 Sizzler restaurants in Thailand and indirectly controlled a dozen restaurants in Japan through a franchise agreement with Royal that Minor inherited from Collins. The total (75) is greater than that controlled by Sizzler USA (74).

=== Former locations ===
==== Australia ====
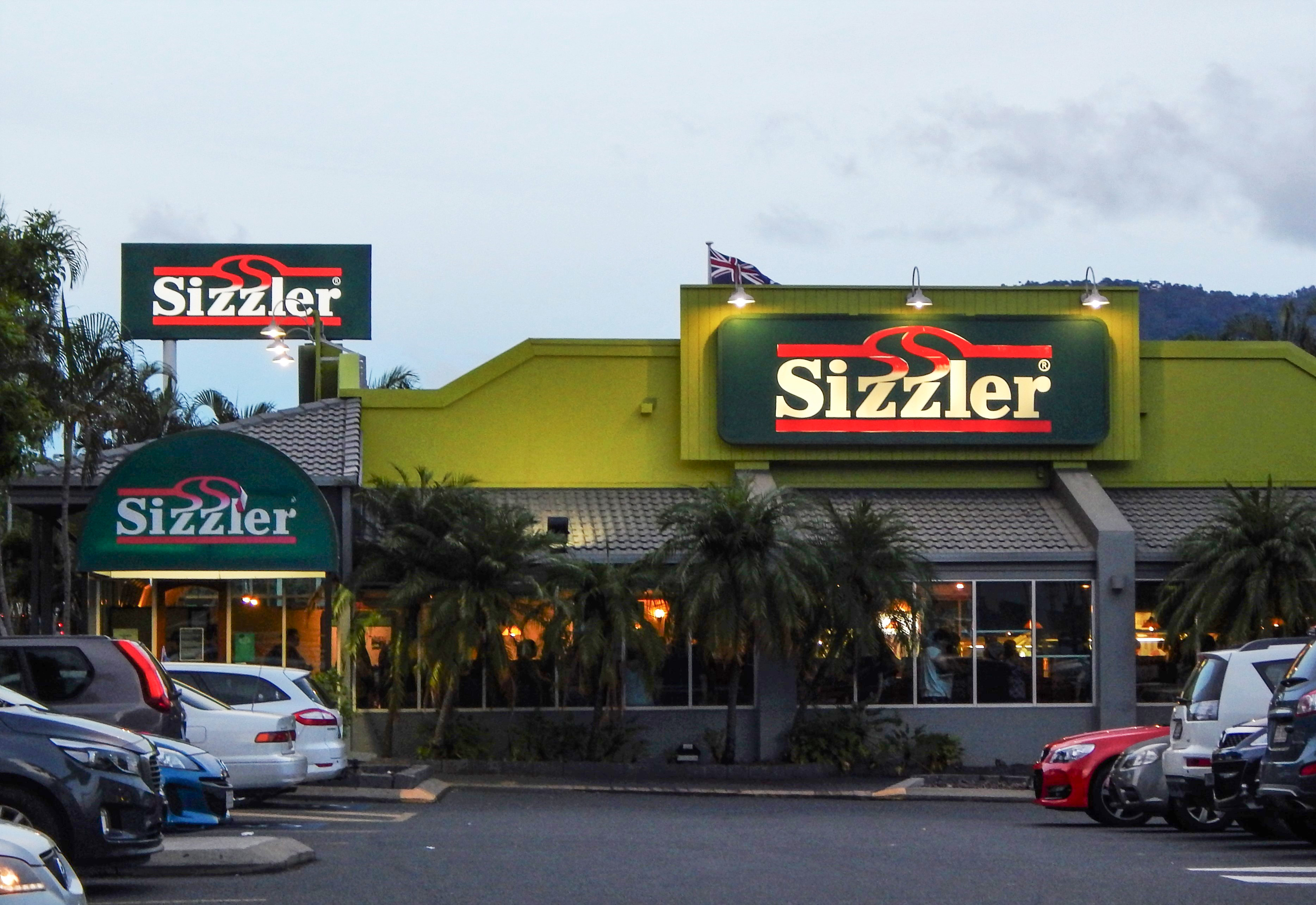
Sizzler in Rockhampton, Australia just prior to its closure (2020)

The first Australian Sizzler steakhouse was opened in Brisbane in 1985. The steakhouses in Australia were reasonably popular during the 1990s. In the 2013 financial year, Collins Foods reported stalling revenue for their Sizzler operations in Australia, blaming the downturn of the casual dining sector in the country.

By 2015, Collins Foods wrote down the value of Sizzler by AU$37.5 million. In an investors meeting by Collins Foods, CEO Graham Maxwell stated, "We no longer consider Sizzler to be a strategic growth prospect in Australia and therefore we will not be investing further capital". Collins Foods began to close a number of Sizzler restaurants in Australia. Meanwhile, Collins Foods' Sizzler operations in Asia continued to thrive, with further expansion planned in China.

Collins Foods closed all of its remaining Sizzler restaurants in Australia in November 2020. Collins Foods said of the three restaurant brands that it operated, Sizzler had been hardest hit by the COVID-19 pandemic. In 2023, Collins sold its Sizzler business to Thailand-based Minor International, ending its relationship with the Sizzler brand.

In February 2026, Minor announced they are planning to return the Sizzler brand to Australia by opening a new Sizzler restaurant inside a Minor Hotels NH Collection Hotel that is under construction in Sydney near the entrance to the domestic terminals of Sydney Airport, with plans to expand to other locations as well.

==== Taiwan ====
Sizzler was in operation in Taipei for 20 years at Tianmu and Da'an from 1990 to 2010, before the franchisee eventually closed due to failure to re-negotiate a new contract with international master franchiser Collins Foods. There were 11 locations in Taipei at its peak before diminishing to the final two locations when the chain left Taiwan at the end of 2010.

==== China ====
According to archived snapshots of the official Sizzler China website, the Thailand-based Minor Food Group had seven Sizzler restaurants in China from May 2009 and November 2012.

==== Indonesia ====
An American Grill restaurant in Jakarta, Indonesia, still retaining the Sizzler branding

In Indonesia, Sizzler entered the country in 1992, but all locations were rebranded as American Grill around the early 2010s; a 2016 report listed six outlets in Jakarta and Surabaya. A later feature in Media Indonesia described American Grill as previously known as Sizzler, and a Tripadvisor listing for a Jakarta location is marked as closed.

==== Singapore ====
According to archived snapshots of the official Sizzler Singapore website, Collins had three Sizzler restaurants in Singapore in December 2001. In March 2013, the company had two Sizzler restaurants in Singapore.

== Food safety issues ==
In 2000, more than 60 people became ill and one person died in an outbreak of E. coli O157:H7 that originated at a Sizzler restaurant in Milwaukee, Wisconsin. Health officials said that the most likely source of contamination was meat supplied by the Excel Corporation meat packer. The health officials believed that cross-contamination to other food items occurred when Sizzler employees handled the meat near areas where salad bar items were prepared. This was similar to an outbreak in Washington and Oregon in 1993. In the 1993 case, as in 2000, the tainted meat apparently came from Excel and contaminated salad bar items. This ultimately led to Sizzler closing the chain's remaining Midwest locations, including those in Wisconsin, Illinois, and Indiana.

In 2006, all 28 Sizzler restaurants across Australia suspended salad bar service after rat poison was found in two of their Brisbane restaurants. Sizzler Australia referred to the incidents as sabotage. The culprit turned out to be a woman described as being mentally unstable.

== See also ==
- List of buffet restaurants
- List of casual dining restaurant chains
