= Jack Penrod =

American businessman (1939–2025)

Jack Penrod (June 25, 1939 – February 3, 2025) was an American businessman. He was the founder and owner of Nikki Beach Worldwide, a global luxury lifestyle and hospitality brand. Before founding Nikki Beach, Penrod was the founder and owner of Penrod's Beach Club in Daytona Beach, Fort Lauderdale, and Miami. Prior to the club's business, Penrod was the largest McDonald's franchise owner in Florida in the 1980s.

== Life and career ==
=== McDonald's ===
Penrod started his career with McDonald's Restaurant Corporation in 1969 as a line cook. Penrod eventually became the largest franchise owner of the McDonald's brand Restaurant in Florida with 16 Restaurants.

=== Wuv's ===
For six years Penrod created and expanded a chain of hamburger restaurants under the name of Wuv's International, Inc., based in Ft. Lauderdale Florida. The firm filed for Chapter 11 in 1981.

=== Penrod's Beach Club ===
After the franchise business, Penrod turned his attention toward the entertainment, nightlife, and hospitality industry. Penrod opened several clubs in Daytona Beach, Ft. Lauderdale, and Miami. Penrod's Beach Club in Fort Lauderdale attracted up to half a million patrons each spring break.

After working with the city of Miami, in 1985 Jack decided to move his operations to Miami Beach. Before opening in Miami Beach, Penrod spent the first few years traveling through the United States to promote the opening of Penrod's Beach Club in Miami Beach. Three years later, Penrod's Beach Club opened its doors of a $4 million entertainment complex at One Ocean Drive, Miami Beach.

=== Nikki Beach ===
Nikki Beach is a chain of luxury beach clubs. On December 15, 1997, Penrod created Café Nikki, a garden at Penrod's Beach Club in South Beach, that later turned into Nikki Beach.

In 1998, Penrod decided to expand the beach club concept to the beach with a French-style beach club and restaurant. Nikki Beach expanded into a luxury lifestyle brand across the world, with locations including Thailand, Bali, Indonesia; Miami Beach, Florida; Barbados; St. Barth, French West Indies; Marbella, Spain; Cabo San Lucas, Mexico; and Marrakech, Morocco.

Nikki Beach is named in tribute to Penrod's daughter, Nicole Penrod, who died in a car accident in Miami in 1997.

=== Personal life and death ===
Penrod was born in Columbus, Ohio, on June 25, 1939. He died from cancer in Fort Lauderdale on February 3, 2025, at the age of 85.

== Recognition ==
Miami-Dade County officials and the City of Miami Beach proclaimed April 17, 2012, as "Jack Penrod Day."
