= Siam Land Flying =

Thailand-based airline

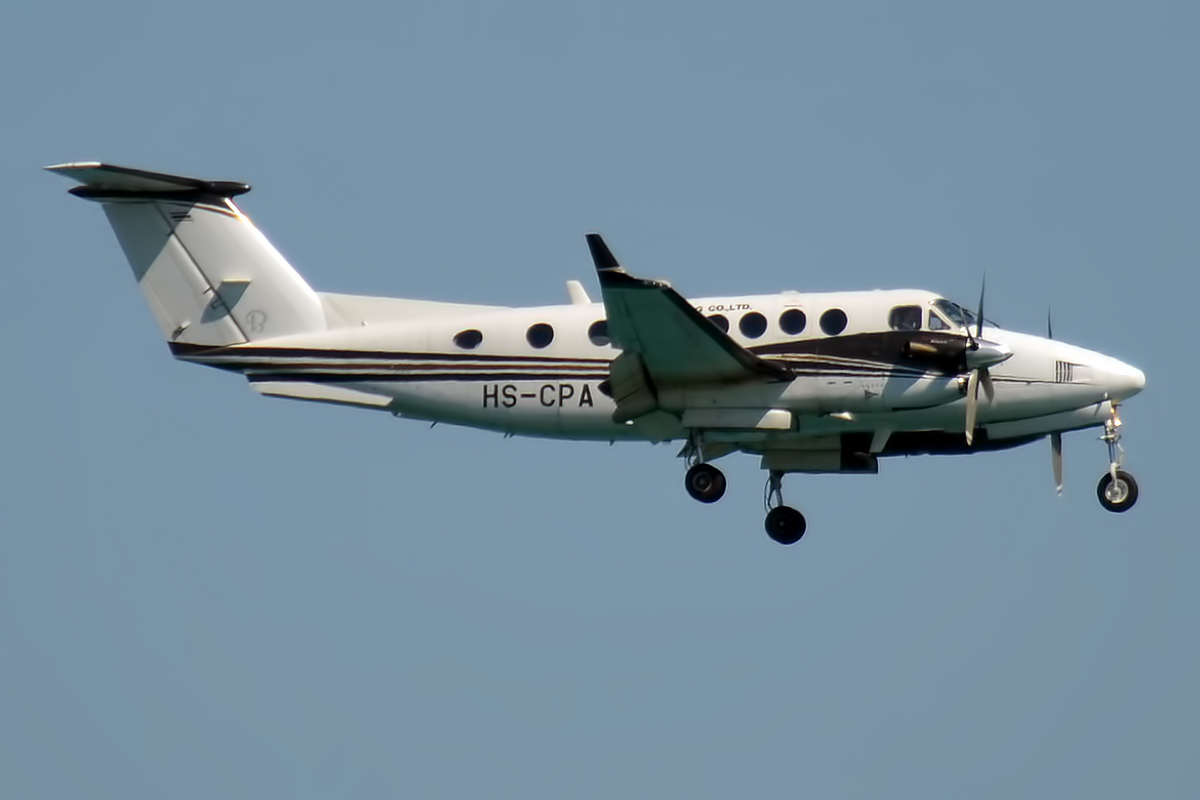
- Commenced operations: 1991
- Hubs: Don Mueang International Airport; Phuket International Airport
- Parent company: Charoen Pokphand Group

Siam Land Flying is an airline based in Thailand, and a wholly-owned subsidiary of the Charoen Pokphand (CP) Group. It expanded from a private flight department to now providing private jet charter, medical (air ambulance) services, and operates a private jet terminal, expanding its activities to support a broader range of aviation services.

== History ==
Siam Land Flying Co, Ltd. was founded in 1991 as the private flight department of the CP group to support executive travel within the company, operating from Don Mueang International Airport. In 1998, the company broadened their scope, launching their private charter service under the name Executive Wings, providing services to external clients rather than only serving CP group executives. The following year, they continued expanding the business by adding an air ambulance service under the name Medical Wings, offering "bed-to-bed" services to cater for critically ill patients.

in 2015, they became the first Asian operator to be accredited by CAMTS (the U.S. Commission on Accreditation of Medical Transport Systems), and in 2016 it gained EURAMI accreditation from the European Aeromedical Institute. The airline also became the first Asian operator and the second operator worldwide to achieve a dual accreditation from CAMTS and CAMTS Global in 2018.

In December 2021, the company took a major step by inaugurating the Siam Land Private Jet Terminal (SLPJT) at Phuket International Airport, improving operational efficiency. The 1,200m² facility features VIP lounges, on-site immigration and customs, and full ground-handling services. It officially became operational in February 2022, providing a dedicated terminal for private jet operations.
