= Dubai Women Establishment =

The Dubai Women Establishment (DWE) is an organization established in 2006 in order to support women in the United Arab Emirates. The organization is supportive of policies that empower women in the workplace, and help "develop an environment that fosters innovation." Retention of women in the workforce, by allowing them to balance their career and children is also an important goal of DWE. DWE also conducts research into the quality of life of women in Dubai and Dubai's workforce. DWE is also involved in affecting politics in Dubai in order to improve the quality of life for women.

== History ==
The Dubai Women Establishment (DWE) was created in 2006 through a directive given by Sheikh Mohammed bin Rashid Al Maktoum. The law creating the organization was law no. (24). The first president of the organization was Manal bint Mohammed bin Rashid Al Maktoum. Shamsa Saleh was promoted the chief executive officer of DWE in 2010 and implements the organizations plans. In 2015, Al Maktoum issued Decree No. (6) to create a new board for the DWE.

== Initiatives ==
The Dubai Women Establishment (DWE) has been able to influence governments and businesses to include women in leadership positions. In 2012, the UAE Cabinet made it "compulsory for corporations and government agencies to include women on their boards of directors." DWE has also produced a manual on how to set up child care facilities for the work place and by 2015, Dubai Customs and the Dubai Electricity and Water Authority have set up child care for their working parents.

DWE is also responsible for hosting an annual "Women Leadership Exchange Program" which helps women learn more about "sustainable leadership practices," provides participants with membership to DWE and allows participants to meet successful women from both government and private industries.

DWE is working on a strategic plan for the years 2017 to 2021 which include "promoting the skills of Emirati women, and enhancing their capabilities, in line with the UAE's strategic priorities."

== See also ==
- Dubai Ladies Club
