= The Wolseley =

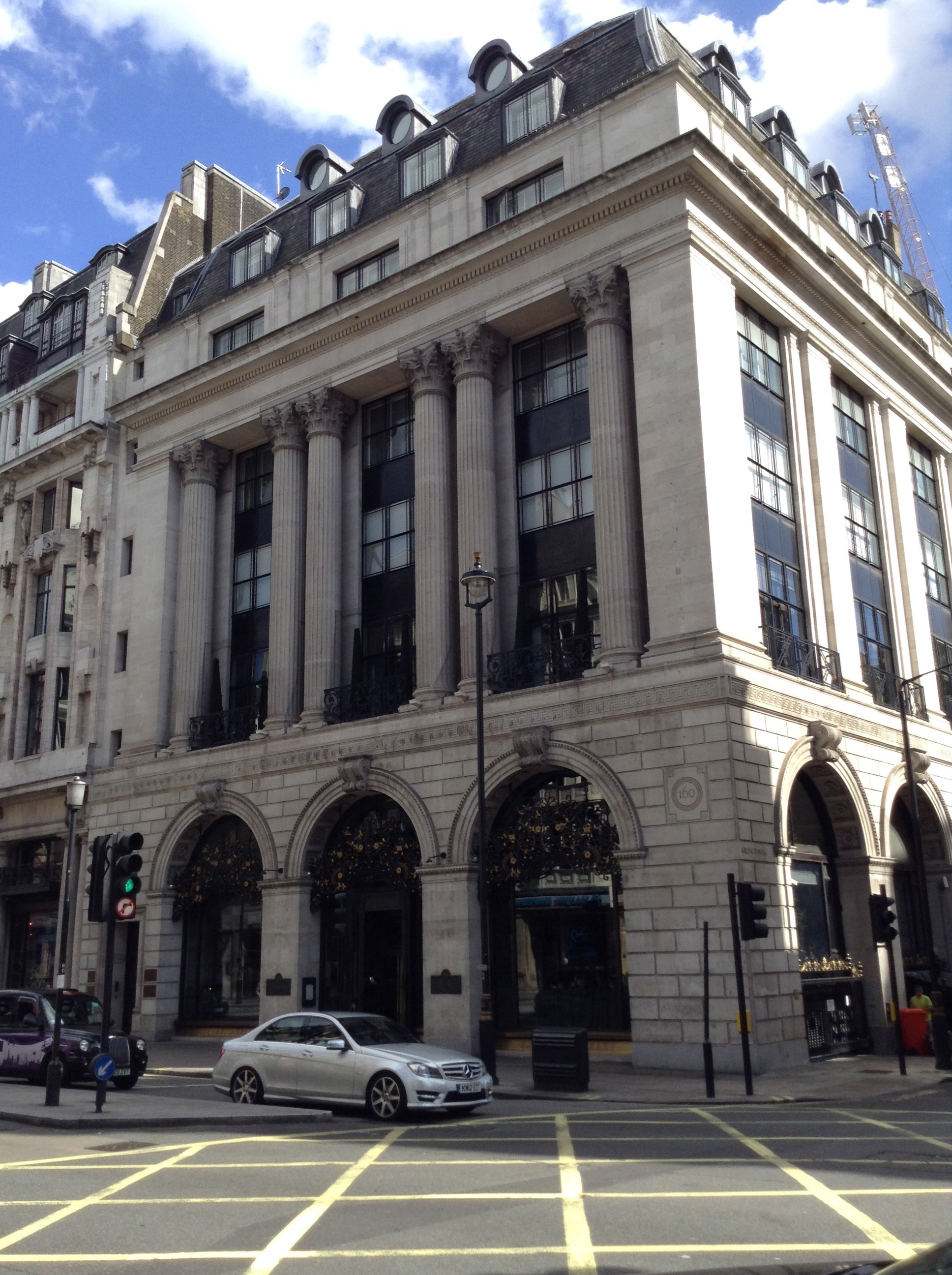
- The renovated Wolseley building in 2014
- Interactive map of The Wolseley

Restaurant information
- Established: 2003; 23 years ago
- Owner: Minor Hotels
- Previous owners: Chris Corbin; Jeremy King
- Food type: European
- Location: 160 Piccadilly, London, W1J 9EB, United Kingdom
- Coordinates: 51.507423°N 0.141014°W
- Other information: Nearest station: Green Park
- Website: thewolseley.com

The Wolseley is a restaurant located at 160 Piccadilly in Westminster, England, next to The Ritz London. Designed by the architect William Curtis Green, the Grade II* listed building was erected by Wolseley Motors in 1921 as their regional offices with a ground floor showroom. The ground floor was occupied by a branch of Barclays Bank between 1927 and 1999. After a brief period as a Chinese restaurant, it reopened in 2003 as the Wolseley following extensive renovations by British restaurateurs Chris Corbin and Jeremy King.

In 2022, the Wolseley came under the ownership of Minor Hotels after the acquisition of the hospitality group Corbin & King, now rebranded as The Wolseley Hospitality Group.

== History ==
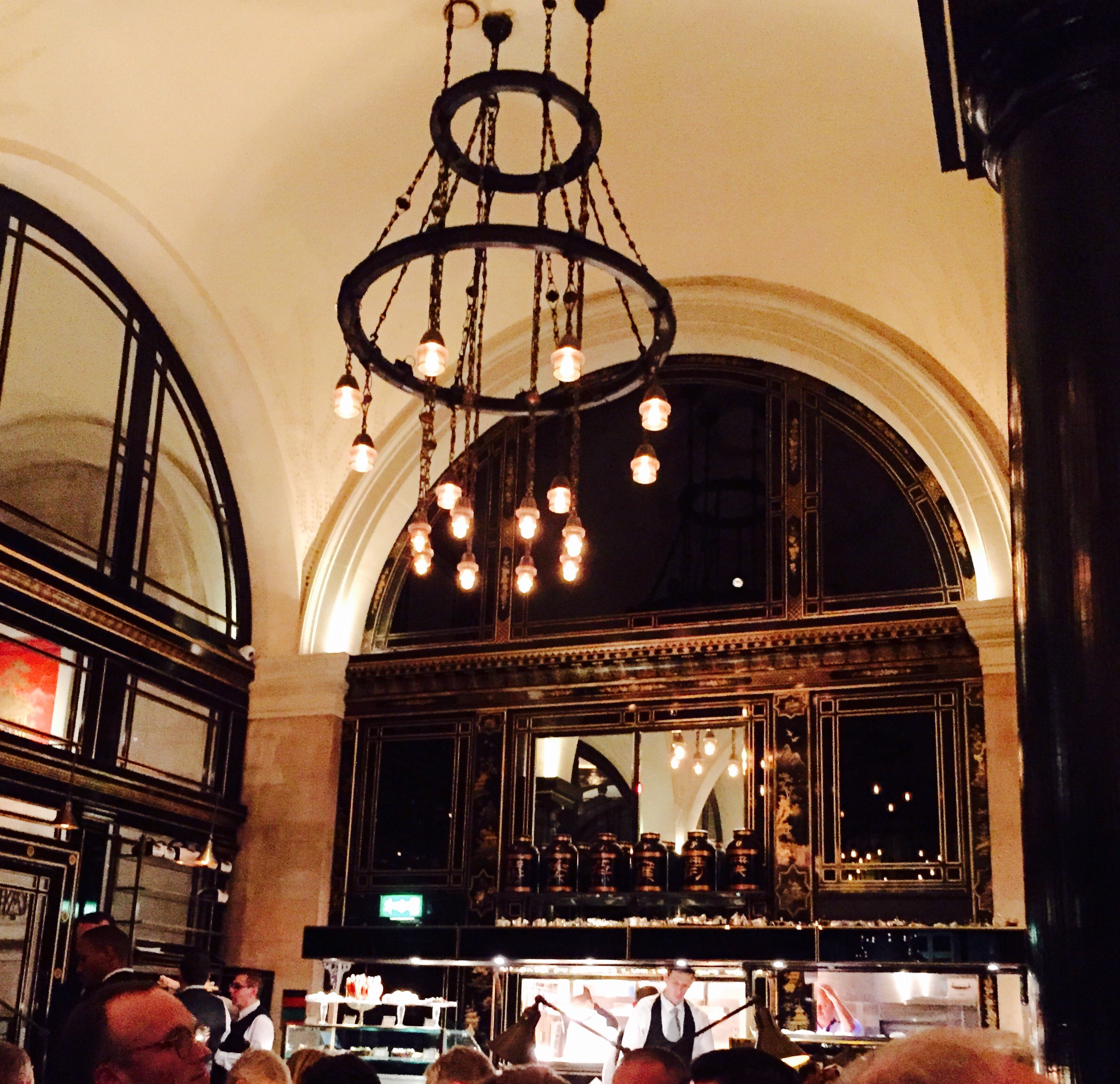
Interior view of the restaurant in 2014, showing the bar and chandelier

=== Wolseley Motors showroom ===
The six-story building was commissioned by Wolseley Motors, a part of the Vickers engineering combine, which bought the site in 1919 for a car showroom and London sales offices. It was designed by the English architect William Curtis Green, drawing inspiration from a recently constructed bank building that he had seen in Boston, Massachusetts. The building, which opened in November 1921, features Venetian and Florentine-inspired detailing, with an interior decorated with lavish marble pillars and archways. Wolseley Motors lost its long-term leadership of the British car industry in the early 1920s and fell into receivership in 1926; the Wolseley showroom was sold in June 1926.

=== Barclays Bank branch ===
The premises were acquired by Barclays Bank, and reopened in April 1927 as the 160 Piccadilly Branch. Barclays reemployed William Curtis Green to create offices and a banking counter, and design furniture in Japanese lacquer. Barclays sold it in 1999 and opened in new smaller offices in nearby St James's Street.

=== Restaurant ===
After the closure of the Barclays branch in 1999, the premises were refurbished and initially turned into a Chinese restaurant ("The Orient at China House") until the building was purchased in July 2003 by the restaurateurs Chris Corbin and Jeremy King, who began a major restoration and renovation project, though they retained many of the original features. The Wolseley opened in November 2003, operating as an all-day café in the "Grand European" style. It has since received numerous accolades, including Harper & Moet's Restaurant of the Year 2004, The Observer's Best Breakfast 2005 and 2009, Tatler's Restaurant of the Year 2007, and Zagat's Favourite Restaurant 2012 and 2013.

The Wolseley has consistently been among London's most profitable restaurants, recording sales of over £10 million in 2007 alone.

== Ownership ==
Corbin & King initially owned The Wolseley, but it became part of The Wolseley Hospitality Group under Minor Hotels after their acquisition of Corbin & King in 2022 for £60 million. This acquisition marked the transition of ownership from co-founder Jeremy King to Minor Hotels.

== Architecture and decoration ==
When the building opened in 1921, elevations to both Arlington Street and Piccadilly were faced with Portland stone. Wolseley's car showroom occupied the entire ground floor. The interior walls were of polished Portland stone with blue York stone dressings, and the floor laid with white and black marble in intricate geometric designs, which remain today. The ceiling consisted of nine domes supported by Doric columns finished in red Japanese lacquer. Red, black, and gold lacquer were also used on the doors, screens, and wall panels. Lighting was provided by elaborate bronze pendants and concealed lamps which threw their rays into the domes to be reflected to the floor. Apart from covering the red lacquer columns with a black wrapping, the present interior remains very close to the original designs of William Curtis Green.
