= Nishita Shah =

Thai businesswoman

Nishita Shah is a Thai businesswoman of Indian descent. She is currently the largest individual shareholder and director of Precious Shipping, one of Thailand's large dry-bulk shipping companies. She is also the managing director of GP Group, a 145-year-old, privately held conglomerate with three listed companies and more than 40 private enterprises which cover a range of sectors – from aviation, healthcare and shipping to software, hospitality and construction. Following on her father’s clear entrepreneurial vision which has defined the company for the past one and a half centuries Nishita's father, Kirit, founded the group in 1989 and took it public in 1993. Her family emigrated from India to Burma to Thailand many years ago.

Nishita also owned a clothing company called Burn Baby and has launched her own fashion label "-Nsha-" in three continents.

Shah is of Gujarati origin. Her father Kirit, who was originally from Gujarat, founded the GP Group of Thailand, which she took over. She is a Boston University graduate.
