= Joseph Joseph =

English houseware manufacturer founded in 2003

Joseph Joseph Ltd
- Type: Private
- Industry: Houseware
- Founded: 2003; 23 years ago
- Founder: Richard Joseph; Antony Joseph
- Headquarters: London, United Kingdom
- Owner: Richard Joseph; Antony Joseph
- Website: www.josephjoseph.com

Joseph Joseph is an English houseware manufacturer best known for its design-led products, founded by twin brothers Richard and Antony Joseph.

== Company history ==
Twin brothers Richard and Antony Joseph founded Joseph Joseph in 2003, combining respective experience in product design and business – Antony studied design at Central St Martins whilst Richard studied industrial design and technology at Loughborough University and business at Cambridge University.

The company started after the brothers' father asked them to help out at his glass manufacturing firm. The company, set up by their grandfather, made toughened glass for products such as cooker hobs. Richard and Antony were given £10,000 worth of stock in order to manufacture glass chopping boards, which still remain part of the Joseph Joseph range.

Since 2003, the brand has expanded into many product areas, including chopping boards, cooking utensils, knives and more recently kitchen waste and recycling bins.

== Product lines ==
- Kitchen utensils
- Chopping boards
- Knives
- Food preparation items
- Tableware & serving items
- Storage and organization products
- Household cleaning accessories
- Intelligent Waste - a waste and recycling unit
