= Radley (company) =

British accessories brand

Radley + Co. Limited
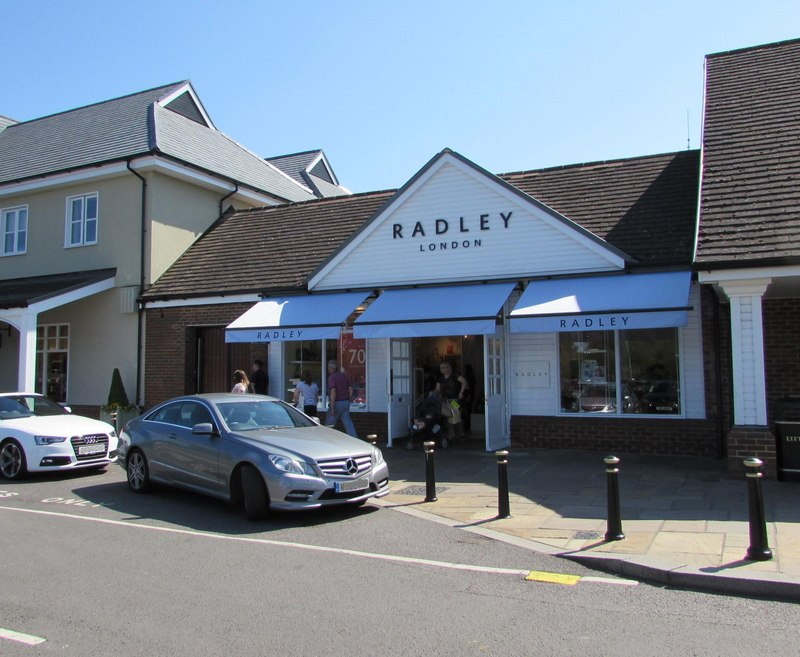
- Radley outlet, Bicester Village
- Trade name: Radley London
- Industry: Fashion
- Founded: 1998; 28 years ago
- Founder: Lowell Harder
- Headquarters: London, United Kingdom
- Number of locations: 19 (2023)
- Area served: Worldwide
- Key people: Nick Vance (CEO)
- Products: Handbags; purses; shoes; watches; luggage; accessories
- Parent: Gordon Brothers
- Website: radley.co.uk

Radley London, commonly known as Radley, is a British accessories brand that designs and retails leather handbags, purses, footwear, and related accessories. Established in 1998 by entrepreneur Lowell Harder, the brand is positioned in the accessible luxury market. In addition to its core product lines, Radley also licenses its name for eyewear, jewellery, watches, and beauty products.

As of August 2024, Spanish designer Fernando Soriano Iglesias serves as Design Director, with his debut collection scheduled for release in August 2025.

== History ==
=== Early years ===
Radley was founded by Australian-born businesswoman Lowell Harder. Her entry into the accessories industry began in 1984, when she operated a weekend stall at London's Camden Market, selling goods from the Indian men's accessories brand Hidesign. Harder later collaborated with Hidesign to create products tailored for the UK market.

In 1991, the business received investment from the Tula Group, a handbag company that provided the infrastructure necessary for further growth. With this backing, Harder continued working with Hidesign and began developing a women's accessories brand. This resulted in the creation of Radley in 1997, with the brand officially launching in 1998.

According to an interview in Drapers trade magazine, Harder was motivated to create Radley due to dissatisfaction with the predominance of handbags in conservative colours such as black and navy. She aimed to develop more vibrant, colourful alternatives to existing market offerings.

Radley experienced significant early growth through a distribution partnership with UK department store John Lewis.

In 2006, private equity firm Phoenix Equity Partners acquired a majority stake in Radley in a deal valued at approximately £45 million. The company was listed for sale the following year and was acquired by Exponent Private Equity in 2007 in a deal reportedly worth £130 million.

In 2016, Bregal Freshstream, a London-based private equity firm backed by the Brenninkmeijer family, acquired Radley. The financial details of the transaction were not disclosed.

== Retail operations ==
Radley products are distributed through a combination of direct-to-consumer and wholesale channels. In the United Kingdom, the brand is available through major retailers including John Lewis, Frasers Group, Marks & Spencer, Next, and QVC, as well as numerous independent stockists.

Internationally, the brand has established a presence in the United States through department stores such as Macy's, Nordstrom, and Dillard's. In Australia, Radley is stocked by Myer department stores.

Radley opened its first standalone retail location in 2005 on King's Road, London. As of 2025, the brand operates two full-price retail stores - on Floral Street in London's Covent Garden and in Buchanan Galleries, Glasgow - along with 18 outlet stores across the UK.

As of November 2025, the company has 21 stores in the UK. As of 1 September 2026 the company went into administration.

== Collaborations ==
In 2010, and again in 2013, Radley announced a partnership with Harris Tweed, to incorporate the Scottish textiles into their handbag designs. In 2013, Radley collaborated with the Scottish fashion designer Holly Fulton for a capsule collection of accessories. Radley has also partnered with cultural institutions such as the Victoria and Albert Museum and worked with illustrators including William Grill, Emma Cowlam, and Rory Crichton for limited-edition product lines.

== Brand ambassadors ==
From Spring/Summer 2012 through to Spring/Summer 2013, Vogue UK's contributing Editor Laura Bailey was Radley's Brand Ambassador. The partnership also saw the launch of two capsule collections co-designed by Bailey. For Autumn/Winter 2013, British model Erin O'Connor appeared in Radley's UK advertising campaign.

== Product offering ==
The brand currently produces handbags, small leather goods, luggage, hats, scarves, gloves, eyewear, casual footwear, watches, gifts and stationery. Radley launched their signature fragrance Radley London in March 2015.

== Charity ==
Radley has previously collaborated with organizations such as the British Heart Foundation and Dogs Trust. The company currently supports Smart Works, a UK-based charity that provides clothing and coaching to help unemployed women prepare for job interviews. Radley has contributed over 1,500 handbags for use in the charity's interview preparation sessions and has participated in various fundraising events, including fashion sales.
