= Bossini =

Hong Kong clothing retailer

Bossini International Holdings Limited 堡獅龍國際集團有限公司
- Company type: Listed company SEHK: 592
- Industry: Fashion retailing
- Founded: 1987
- Headquarters: Tong Yin Street; Tseung Kwan O Sai Kung District; New Territories; Hong Kong
- Area served: Hong Kong and Macau; Mainland China; Singapore; Taiwan; Bangladesh; Brunei; Cambodia; Cyprus; Dominican Republic; India; Indonesia; Kenya; Libya; Malaysia; Middle East; Mongolia; Mozambique; Myanmar; Nepal; Palestine; Reunion Island; Romania; Thailand; Uganda; Venezuela; Vietnam; Australia and New Zealand
- Key people: Chairman of The Board: Mr Victor HERRERO, CEO: Mr MAK Tak Cheong Edmund
- Products: Clothing
- Website: www.bossini.com

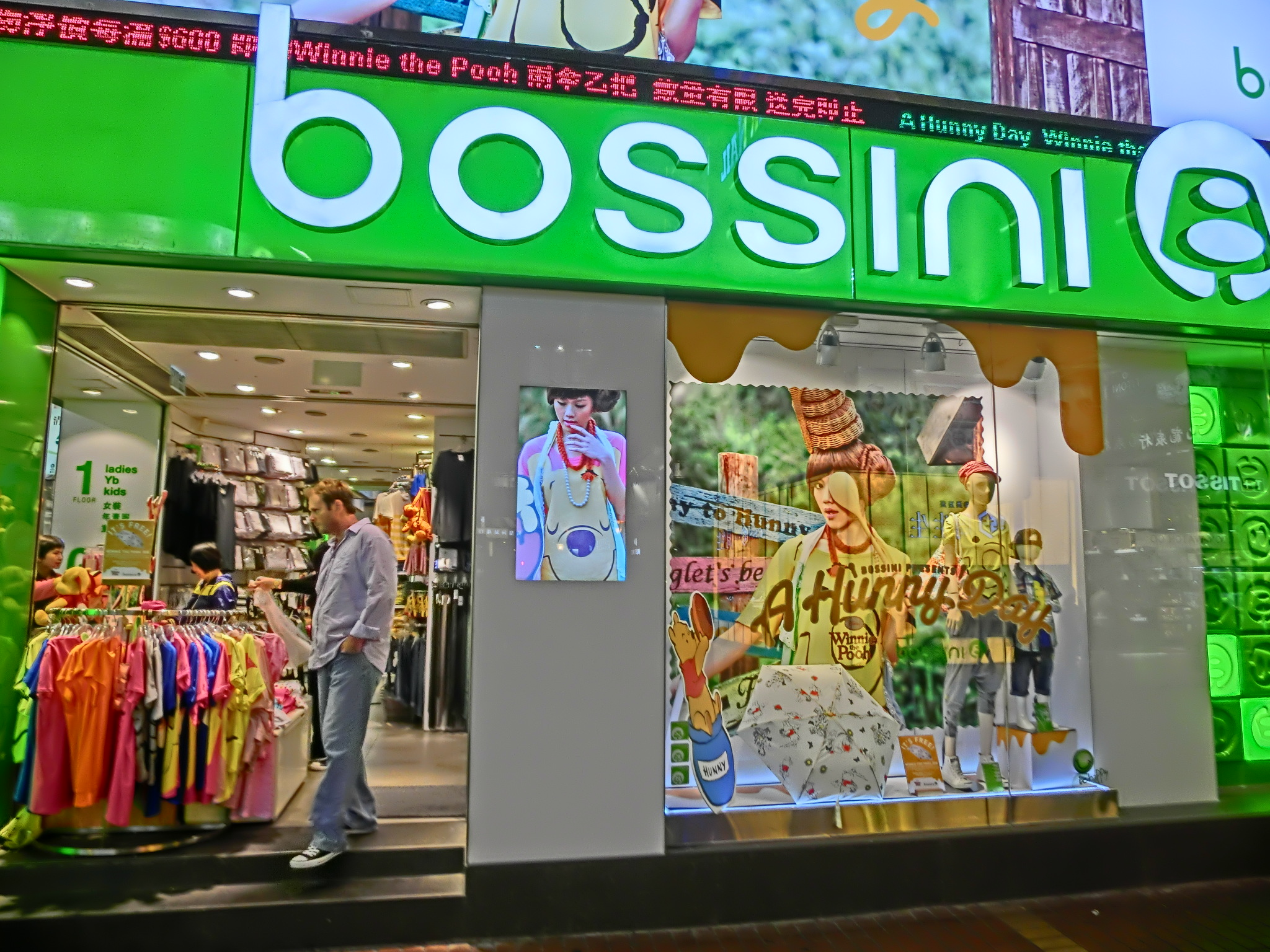
Bossini store at Kiu Chiu Road, Causeway Bay, Hong Kong

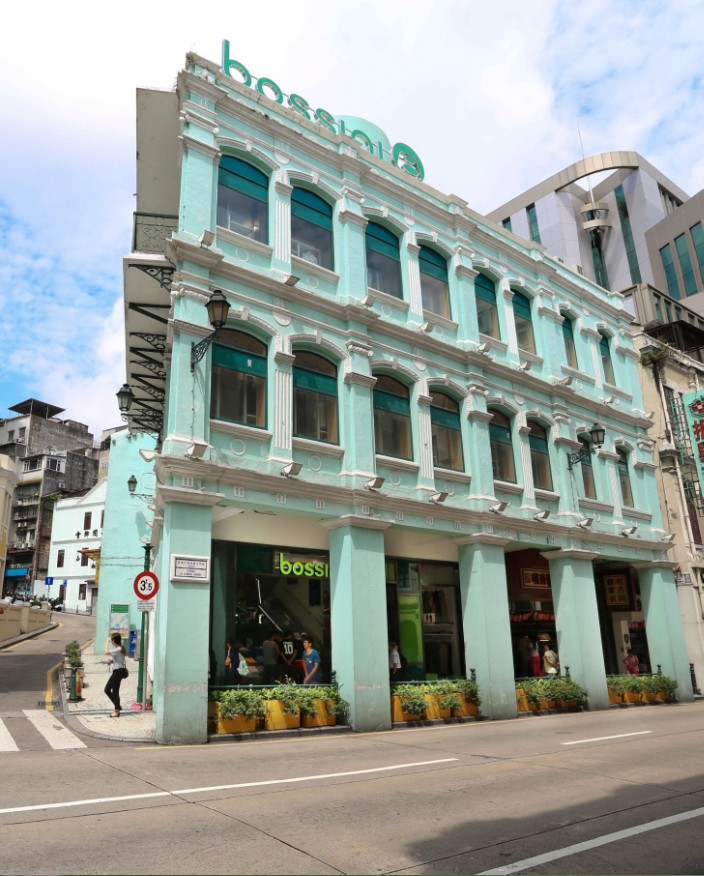
Bossini Largest Store in Macau

Bossini International Holdings Limited and its subsidiaries is an apparel brand owner, retailer and franchiser, headquartered in Hong Kong, with main markets in Hong Kong, mainland China, Taiwan, Thailand and Singapore.

Bossini was founded by Law Ting-pong and launched its first retail store in 1987. It has grown to 938 locations worldwide, a mix of directly managed and franchised stores. The group operates 257 directly managed stores in Hong Kong, mainland China, Taiwan and Singapore, with a further 81 franchised stores in mainland China. In around 40 other countries, the group supports a total of 600 franchised stores, including in Southeast Asia, the Middle East, Europe and Central America.

== History ==
Law Ting-pong was born in Guangdong, China in 1912. He had originally arrived in New Territories, Hong Kong from mainland China, eventually opening a garment factory. In 1987, Bossini opened its first retail outlet in Hong Kong and a store in Singapore. Since 1988 the company has developed into a network of franchised operations and retail outlets throughout Southeast Asia. In 1992, Bossini opened the first store in Taiwan. In 2006, Emirati conglomerate Landmark Group, who received exclusive rights to sell Bossini products in India, announced that they would be helping to introduce Bossini products to India by mid-2006. In 2007, franchised business was launched in Europe and North Africa, one year later in Central America.

Law Ting-pong died in August 1996.

== Product range ==
Bossini markets casual wear apparel products including men's, ladies’, youth and children's wear.

== 2015 kidnapping of Bossini heiress ==
On April 25, 2015, a group of six men broke into the Clear Water Bay home of Queenie Rosita Law, the granddaughter of Law Ting-pong and Bossini heiress. The intruders managed to get past the security system without activating the alarm. They tied up Law and her boyfriend, taped their mouths shut, and forced Law to give the combination to unlock two safes containing HK$3 million worth of money and jewellery. While her boyfriend was instructed to tell her father that she was being held for ransom, Law was carried to a cave on Kowloon Peak. She was held hostage in a tent for three days, eating rice boxes, bread and food from McDonald's the ransomers had given her.

After initially demanding up to HK$50 million in ransom money, the kidnappers agreed to receiving HK$28 million from Law's father, Raymond Law Ka-kui. They collected the money from Raymond Law on a Kowloon Peak hillside, then drove away in what was described to police as a white, seven-seater Honda with a fake license plate.

Investigators issued a dragnet on Kowloon Peak and searched for clues, issuing photos of two suspects on April 28. They also discovered two suitcases, presumably used in the ransom, nearby in Pak Fa Lam that same day. On the 29th, Queenie Law issued a short press conference in the Four Seasons Hotel Hong Kong, assuring that she was physically and mentally well. At this time, local police suspected that the six men were mainland Chinese who left for Tai Po after receiving the ransom money. Initially believing the kidnapping to be happenstance, the police revised their opinion, stating that the kidnapping seemed to be well-planned and premeditated. This was partially based on evidence that the suspects used elaborate escape routes to leave Kowloon Peak.

On May 3, 2015, one of the suspects was apprehended at the Lo Wu Control Point while attempting to leave for Shenzhen. He was arrested and taken back to police in Tsz Wan Shan for questioning. The suspect took part in a four-hour crime reconstruction to help investigators with the case. On May 5, in collaboration with the Hong Kong Police Force, Guangdong police arrested five suspects in various parts of Guangdong, later updated to six. The same day, the initial suspect arrested, Zheng Xingwang, appeared in court. A further two suspects were arrested on May 9 in Huidong Country, Guangdong, with the police able to recover HK$2.8 million of the original HK$28 million from one of the suspects. It was revealed that the kidnappers were initially able to escape the police dragnet because the description of the getaway vehicle given by eyewitnesses was inaccurate.

The vast majority of the money was recovered, and all of the nine men police believe to have been involved were captured and tried.
