= Minor Hotels =

International hotel operator

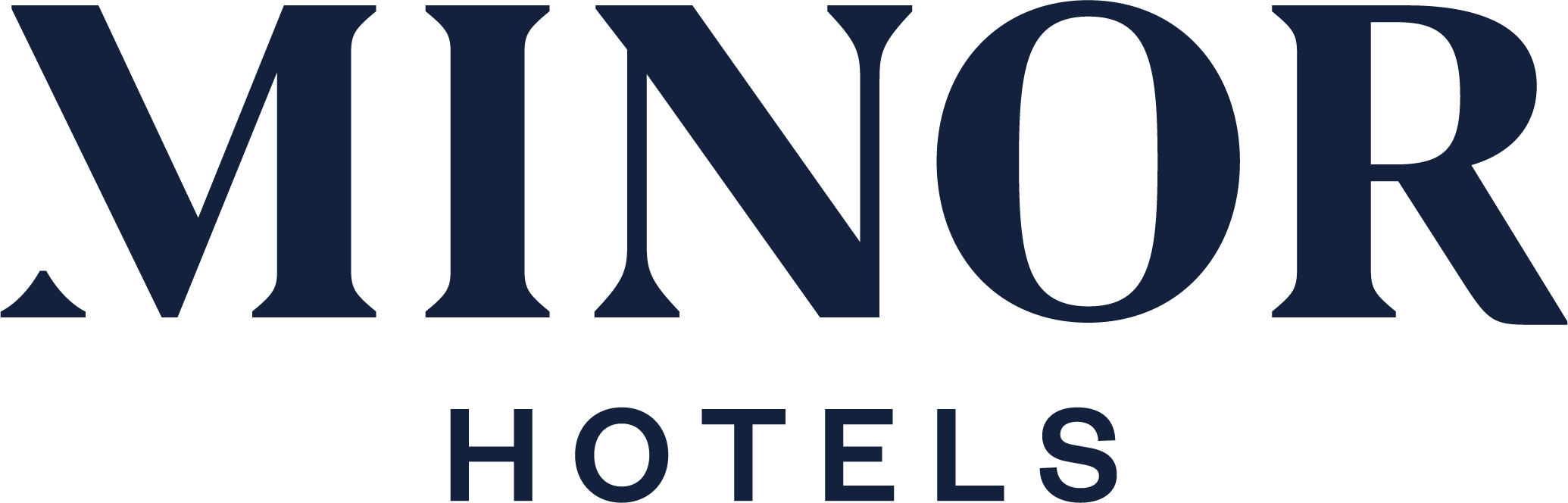
- Type: Subsidiary
- Industry: Hospitality
- Founded: 1978; 48 years ago
- Founder: William Heinecke
- Headquarters: Bangkok, Thailand
- Number of locations: 550 (2024)
- Area served: Worldwide
- Key people: William Heinecke; (Chairman); Dillip Rajakarier; (CEO)
- Brands: Anantara Hotels & Resorts; Avani Hotels & Resorts; Elewana Collection; Oaks Hotels, Resorts & Suites; NH Hotels; NH Collection; nhow Hotels; Tivoli Hotels & Resorts
- Parent: Minor International
- Website: minorhotels.com

Minor Hotels is an international hotel owner, operator, and investor headquartered in Bangkok, Thailand, with more than 550 hotels in over 55 countries across Asia-Pacific, the Middle East, Africa, the Indian Ocean, Europe, and the Americas. Minor Hotels operates as a subsidiary of Minor International, one of the largest hospitality and leisure companies in the Asia-Pacific region. The group operates hotels under the brands of Anantara Hotels & Resorts, Avani Hotels & Resorts, Elewana Collection, Oaks Hotels, Resorts & Suites, NH Hotels, NH Collection, nhow Hotels, and Tivoli Hotels & Resorts.

== History ==
American-born Thai businessman William Heinecke founded the hotel group in 1978, with the opening of the Royal Garden Resort Pattaya as its inaugural venture. The property underwent rebranding over the years, initially becoming the Pattaya Marriott Resort & Spa, and is presently known as the Avani Pattaya Resort.

Minor Hotels entered the luxury hospitality market in 2001 with the opening of its first Anantara Hotels & Resorts in 2001 in Hua Hin. The brand celebrated its 20th anniversary in March 2021, now with a presence in over 40 properties across Asia, Africa, the Middle East, the Indian Ocean, and Europe.

The hotel group began its expansion into Africa in 2008 by acquiring a 50 percent stake in Elewana Afrika, marking the company's first significant venture into the continent. In 2014, Minor Hotels further solidified its presence in Africa with investments in various properties, enhancing its portfolio in the region. In July 2024 it took over management of the former Hilton Sandton in Johannesburg, its first hotel in South Africa, initially operating it as NH Sandton.

In 2011, Minor Hotels broadened its portfolio by acquiring Oaks Hotels, Resorts & Suites, a prominent hotel chain based in Australia. The acquisition resulted in Minor Hotels holding a majority stake of 54.3 percent in the hotel chain, extending its reach into the Australian hospitality market.

Minor Hotels expanded in Europe with the acquisition of Tivoli Hotels & Resorts in 2015. This acquisition included 16 properties across Portugal and Brazil, representing its first significant investment in Europe. The transaction was notable for being the largest hospitality deal in Portugal's history.

In 2017, Minor Hotels acquired a significant stake in Corbin & King, a hospitality group in the United Kingdom known for notable establishments like The Wolseley and The Delaunay. Furthering its investment, Minor Hotels successfully bid to acquire the entire Corbin & King business in April 2022. Subsequently, the group was rebranded as The Wolseley Hospitality Group.

Minor Hotels acquired the NH Hotel Group in 2018. This acquisition added approximately 380 hotels to its portfolio, significantly extending the hotel group's presence in Europe and Latin America.

== Brands ==
=== Anantara Hotels & Resorts ===
Anantara Hotels & Resorts, Minor Hotels' luxury flagship brand, was founded in 2001 with its first property in Hua Hin. Since its inception, Anantara has expanded globally, encompassing properties in diverse locations such as beaches, private islands, countryside retreats, desert sands, heritage sites, and cosmopolitan cities.

The brand's portfolio now spans over 40 countries, including Austria, Cambodia, China, France, Hungary, Indonesia, Ireland, Italy, Malaysia, Maldives, Mauritius, Mozambique, Netherlands, Oman, Portugal, Qatar, Seychelles, Spain, Sri Lanka, Thailand, Tunisia, United Arab Emirates, Vietnam, and Zambia.

In 2010, the brand launched the Anantara Vacation Club, a points-based timeshare project, offering options in various global destinations.

In 2025, Anantara properties in Koh Samui and Phuket were used as filming locations for the third season of The White Lotus, including Anantara Bophut Koh Samui Resort, Anantara Lawana Koh Samui Resort, and Anantara Mai Khao Phuket Villas.

=== Avani Hotels & Resorts ===
Avani Hotels & Resorts, launched in 2011, currently operates in over 20 countries, including Australia, Botswana, Cambodia, Colombia, Italy, Indonesia, South Korea, Laos, Lesotho, Malaysia, Mexico, Mozambique, Namibia, New Zealand, Portugal, Seychelles, Spain, Sri Lanka, Thailand, United Arab Emirates, Vietnam, and Zambia.

The brand is on a trajectory of growth, with expectations to expand its portfolio to over 100 properties globally by 2026.

=== Elewana Collection ===
In 2008, Minor Hotels expanded into Africa by acquiring a 50 percent stake in Elewana Afrika, now branded as the Elewana Collection.

The Elewana Collection comprises 16 boutique lodges, camps, and hotels across Kenya and Tanzania, offering unique accommodations. In 2015, Minor Hotels further increased its presence in the region by acquiring a majority stake in four Kenyan properties from Cheli & Peacock, along with associated safari tour operating companies.

=== Oaks Hotels, Resorts & Suites ===
Minor Hotels completed its acquisition of Oaks Hotels, Resorts & Suites, an Australian-based accommodation provider, in 2011.

The brand, originally founded in Australia in 1991, offers over 60 properties primarily in Australia and New Zealand, with additional locations in China, India, Qatar, and the United Arab Emirates.

=== NH Hotels ===
Minor Hotels acquired a 94.1 percent stake in the Spanish multi-national hotel company NH Hotel Group during the last quarter of 2018 at a total volume of €2,327m.

NH Hotel Group, which includes NH Hotels, NH Collection, and nhow Hotels, operates over 350 hotels in 35 countries. NH Hotels is positioned in the midscale to upscale segment, with urban hotels catering to both business and leisure travelers.

=== NH Collection ===
Established in 2014, NH Collection operates in the upper to upscale segment, located in major capital cities across Europe and Latin America.

=== nhow Hotels ===
The hotels are located in urban area.

=== Tivoli Hotels & Resorts ===
In 2016, Portugal saw its to this Date largest hotel deal when Minor Hotels acquired Tivoli Hotels & Resorts, a hotel chain that owns 16 properties across Portugal, Brazil, and Qatar. The acquisition, which marked Minor Hotels' entry into Europe and Latin America, totaled €294.2 million.

== Other ventures ==
=== Restaurants ===
==== The Wolseley Hospitality Group ====
Minor Hotels acquired a significant stake in the hospitality group Corbin & King, founded by restaurateurs Jeremy King and Chris Corbin, in 2017. Minor Hotels acquired the entire business in 2022 for £60 million, leading to the rebranding of the group as The Wolseley Hospitality Group.

The group includes establishments such as The Wolseley, The Delaunay (and The Delaunay Counter), Brasserie Zédel, Manzi's, Colbert, Fischer's, Café Wolseley, Soutine, and Bellanger.

=== Wellness ===
Minor Hotels has been active in the wellness sector through collaborations and acquisitions.

In 2022, Minor Hotels partnered with Bangkok Dusit Medical Services to open the BDMS Wellness Clinic at Anantara Riverside Bangkok Resort.

==== MSpa International ====
Originally a joint venture in 1999, Minor Hotels has fully acquired MSpa International, now operating over 70 spas worldwide under brands like Anantara Spa and AvaniSpa.

In 2020, Minor Hotels partnered with Clinique La Prairie to open its first medical spa outside of Europe at The St. Regis Bangkok.

=== Cruises ===
==== Loy Pela Voyages ====
Minor Hotels operates river cruises through Loy Pela Voyages, departing from Anantara Riverside Bangkok Resort. The cruises provide a blend of contemporary and historical experiences along the Chao Phraya River, connecting Bangkok with the historical city of Ayutthaya.

==== Mekong Kingdoms ====
Launched in 2018 by Minor Hotels, Mekong Kingdoms offers luxury river cruises between Thailand and Laos, including routes from the Golden Triangle to Luang Prabang.

=== Trains ===
==== The Vietage by Anantara ====
The Vietage by Anantara offers luxury train travel in Vietnam, featuring 12-seat carriages, with routes connecting Da Nang, Quy Nhon, and Nha Trang.

== Partnerships ==
- In early 2021, Minor Hotels formed a strategic partnership with Funyard Hotels & Resorts to expand its presence in China.
- Minor Hotels formed a partnership with VLCC to develop wellness and beauty centers, starting with Avani+ Hua Hin Resort.
- Minor Hotels is launching the Asian Institute of Hospitality Management in collaboration with Les Roches, with campuses opening in Bangkok and Chonburi, Thailand.
