= Oaks Hotels, Resorts & Suites =

Hotel brand headquartered in Australia

- Type: Subsidiary
- Industry: Hospitality
- Founded: 1991; 35 years ago
- Headquarters: Sunshine Coast, Queensland, Australia
- Area served: Australia, New Zealand, China, India, Qatar, United Arab Emirates
- Parent: Minor Hotels
- Website: oakshotels.com

Oaks Hotels, Resorts & Suites is a hotel brand with over 60 properties predominantly located in Australia and New Zealand, and a smaller number of sites in other countries. Originally founded in Australia in 1991, the brand forms part of a larger global company, Minor Hotels.

== History ==
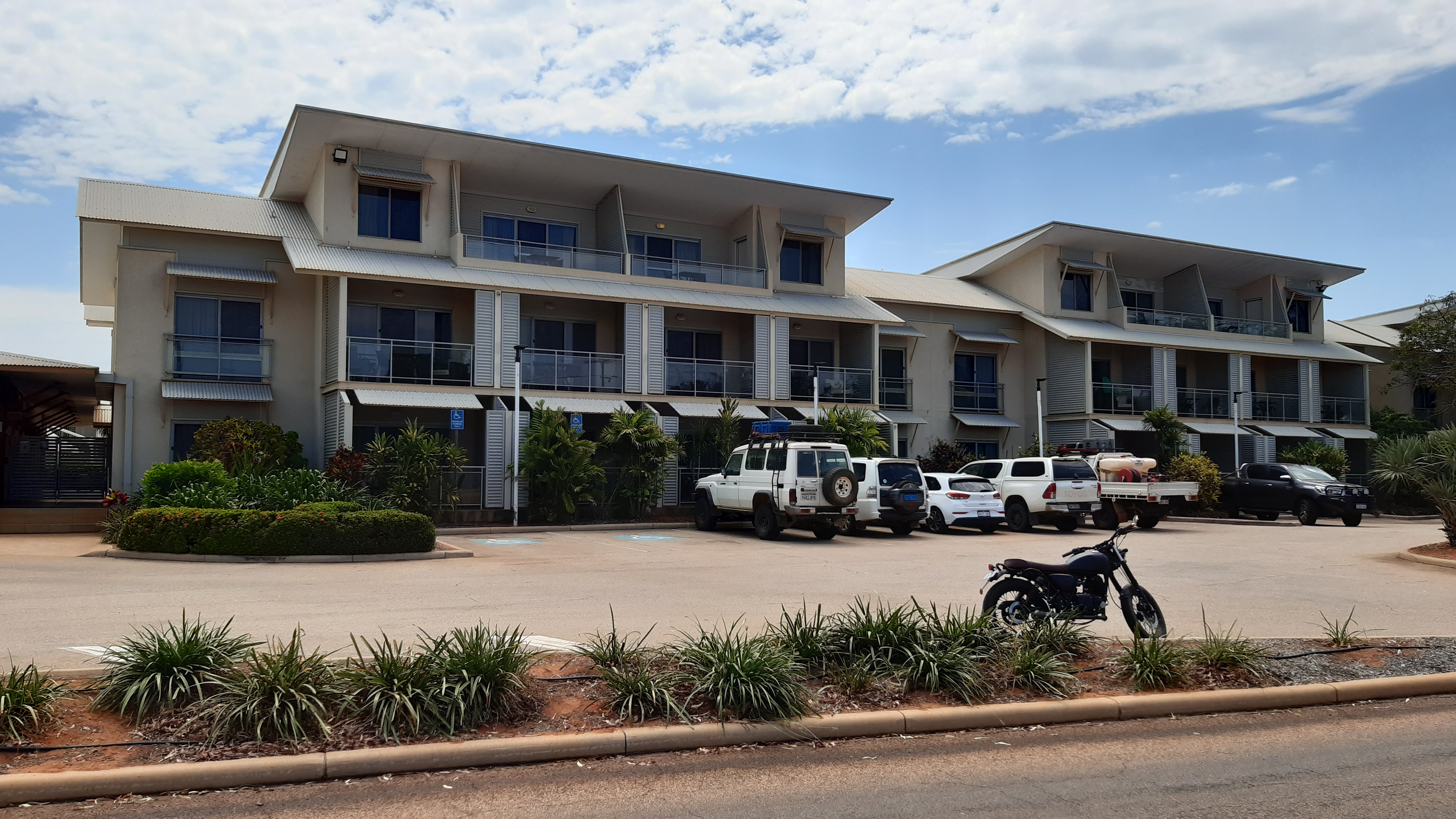
One of two Oaks Hotels locations in Broome, Western Australia

Oaks Hotels, Resorts & Suites was founded in 1991 on Queensland’s Sunshine Coast, and was subsequently acquired by Minor Hotels in 2011. In addition to its Australian and New Zealand properties, Oaks also has properties in China, India, Qatar, and the United Arab Emirates.
