= Avani Hotels & Resorts =

Hotel chain owned by Minor Hotels

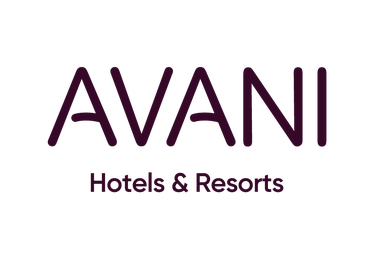
- Company type: Subsidiary
- Industry: Hospitality
- Founded: 2011; 15 years ago
- Headquarters: Bangkok, Thailand
- Area served: Worldwide
- Parent: Minor Hotels
- Website: avanihotels.com

Avani Hotels & Resorts is a hotel and resort brand with more than 40 properties in over 20 countries. The majority of the properties are based in Thailand, whereas a smaller number of properties are established in a few other countries. The brand is a part of the hospitality chain Minor Hotels.

== History ==
Avani Hotels & Resorts launched in 2011 with their first property in Bentota.

The brand currently operates in over 20 countries, including Australia, Botswana, Cambodia, Colombia, Italy, Indonesia, South Korea, Laos, Lesotho, Malaysia, Maldives, Mexico, Germany, Mozambique, Namibia, New Zealand, Portugal, Seychelles, Spain, Sri Lanka, Thailand, United Arab Emirates, Vietnam, and Zambia, with expectations to expand its portfolio to over 100 properties globally by 2026.
