= 2021 F4 Argentina Championship =

Motor racing competition

F4 Argentina Championship logo

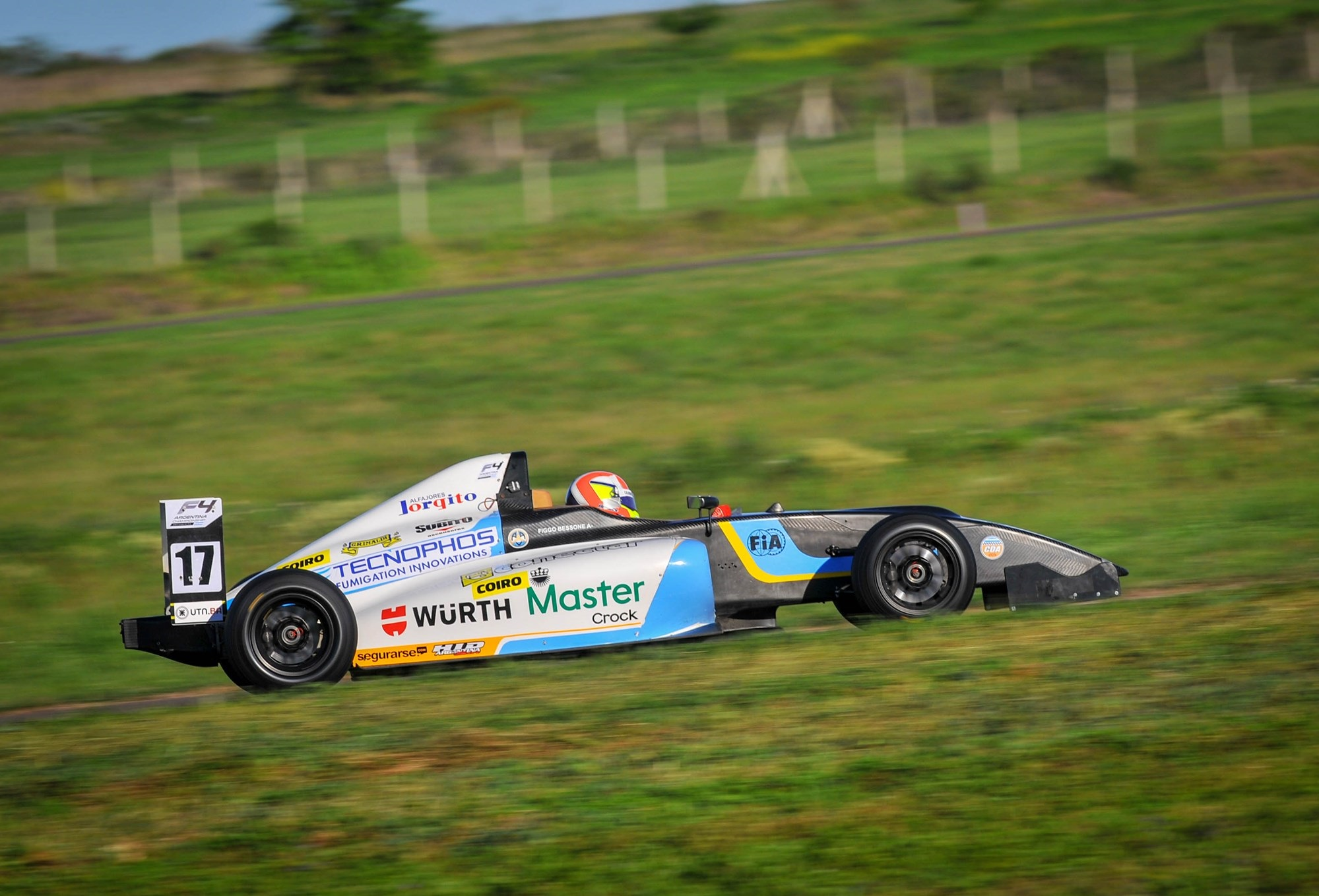

The 2021 F4 Argentina Championship was the first and only season of the F4 Argentina Championship. It was a multi-event motor racing championship for open wheel, formula racing cars regulated according to FIA Formula 4 regulations. The championship uses Mygale M14-F4 chassis. The season commenced on 16 April at Autódromo Ciudad de Concordia and concluded on 4 December at Autódromo Oscar Cabalén.

== History ==
Gerhard Berger and the FIA Singleseater Commission launched Formula 4 in March 2013. The goal of the Formula 4 was to make the ladder to Formula 1 more transparent. Besides sporting and technical regulations, costs are also regulated. A car to compete in this category may not exceed €30,000 and a single season in Formula 4 may not exceed €100,000.

The 2019 F4 Argentina Championship season was originally slated to begin at Buenos Aires in July and conclude at the same circuit on December 1. The start of the season was postponed to October 18-19, then delayed again before being completely cancelled. The new Argentinian Formula 4 Championship has had its first season delayed once again, with a start date planned for 2020, however the season was cancelled due to COVID-19 pandemic. The series started in 2021.

== Format ==
Each round consisted of two practice sessions, one qualifying session that determines the grid for Race 1. The grid for Race 2 was set by the fastest lap in the first race.

== Car ==
The championship featured cars that were designed and built by French race car constructor Mygale. The cars were made up of carbon fiber and had monocoque chassis. The engine was made up of 2.0 Geely G-Power JLD-4G20.

== Driver lineup ==
No.	Driver	Rounds
7	(Argentina) Ignacio Grippo	2
7	(Argentina) Mateo Nuñez	3
28	(Argentina) Mateo Nuñez	4–6
10	(Argentina) Thiago Martínez	1
11	(Argentina) Pablo Grippo	1
12	(Argentina) Federico Hermida	All
13	(Argentina) Bautista Dose	1
14	(Argentina) Pablo Collazo	All
15	(Argentina) Ramiro Alcaine	1
16	(Argentina) Luciano Martínez	1–3
17	(Argentina) Figgo Bessone	All
20	(Argentina) Gerónimo Nuñez	5–6
21	(Argentina) Lucas Bohdanowicz	2–5
22	(Argentina) Tomás Pellandino	4
23	(Argentina) Lucas Yerobi	4
27	(Argentina) Cristobal Riestra	3
42	(Argentina) Joaquín Bonnet	4
71	(Bolivia) Rodrigo Gutiérrez	5
77	(Argentina) Braian Quevedo	2–3, 5–6
88	(Panama) Valentino Miní	6
99	(Argentina) Bautista Damiani	2, 4
111	(Argentina) Ayrton Chorne	5

== Race calendar ==
All rounds were held in Argentina. Initially, the series planned to support the entire inaugural season of TCR South America but the idea was dropped later on due to travel restrictions and the limit of two abroad rounds. The first four rounds supported Turismo Pista. The planned second round at Autódromo de Concepción del Uruguay was postponed and the circuit was chosen to be the host of the third round. After the cancellation of the round at Autódromo Municipal Juan Manuel Fangio on 9–10 September, the next two events were expanded to three races. All rounds but the fifth one supported Turismo Pista. The championship raced alongside the TCR series for the last two rounds.

Round		Circuit	Date	Pole position	Fastest lap	Winning driver
1	R1	Autódromo Ciudad de Concordia, Concordia	17 April	(Argentina) Federico Hermida	(Argentina) Federico Hermida	(Argentina) Federico Hermida
1	R2	Autódromo Ciudad de Concordia, Concordia	18 April		(Argentina) Pablo Collazo	(Argentina) Federico Hermida
2	R1	Autódromo Oscar y Juan Gálvez, Buenos Aires (Circuit N° 8)	19 June	(Argentina) Lucas Bohdanowicz	(Argentina) Luciano Martínez	(Argentina) Lucas Bohdanowicz
2	R2	Autódromo Oscar y Juan Gálvez, Buenos Aires (Circuit N° 8)	19 June		(Argentina) Lucas Bohdanowicz	(Argentina) Lucas Bohdanowicz
3	R1	Autódromo de Concepción del Uruguay, Concepción del Uruguay	31 July	(Argentina) Federico Hermida	(Argentina) Federico Hermida	(Argentina) Federico Hermida
3	R2	Autódromo de Concepción del Uruguay, Concepción del Uruguay	31 July		(Argentina) Federico Hermida	(Argentina) Federico Hermida
4	R1	Autódromo de Concepción del Uruguay, Concepción del Uruguay	2 October	(Argentina) Federico Hermida	(Argentina) Federico Hermida	(Argentina) Federico Hermida
4	R2	Autódromo de Concepción del Uruguay, Concepción del Uruguay	2 October		(Argentina) Federico Hermida	(Argentina) Federico Hermida
4	R3	Autódromo de Concepción del Uruguay, Concepción del Uruguay	3 October		(Argentina) Federico Hermida	(Argentina) Federico Hermida
5	R1	Autódromo Oscar y Juan Gálvez, Buenos Aires (Circuit N° 8)	12 November	(Argentina) Federico Hermida	(Argentina) Federico Hermida	(Argentina) Federico Hermida
5	R2	Autódromo Oscar y Juan Gálvez, Buenos Aires (Circuit N° 8)	13 November		(Argentina) Braian Quevedo	(Argentina) Federico Hermida
5	R3	Autódromo Oscar y Juan Gálvez, Buenos Aires (Circuit N° 8)	13 November		(Argentina) Federico Hermida	(Argentina) Gerónimo Nuñez (Note: Braian Quevedo crossed the line as the first but was given a 30 second penalty for causing a collision. G. Nuñez inherited the win.)
6	R1	Autódromo Oscar Cabalén, Alta Gracia	4 December	(Panama) Valentino Mini	(Argentina) Braian Quevedo	(Argentina) Braian Quevedo
6	R2	Autódromo Oscar Cabalén, Alta Gracia	4 December		(Panama) Valentino Mini	(Argentina) Braian Quevedo

== Championship standings ==
Points were awarded as follows:

Races	Position, points per race											
Races	**1st**	**2nd**	**3rd**	**4th**	**5th**	**6th**	**7th**	**8th**	**9th**	**10th**	**Pole**	**Entry**
Rounds 1 & 6	50	36	30	24	20	16	12	8	4	2	1	1
Rounds 2–5	25	18	15	12	10	8	6	4	2	1	1	1

=== Drivers' standings ===
Pos	Driver	CON		BUA1		CDU1		CDU2			BUA2			AGR		EE	Pts
1	(Argentina) Federico Hermida	**1**	1	2	4	**1**	1	**1**	1	1	**1**	1	6	5	3	6	373
2	(Argentina) Figgo Bessone	2	4	3	5	5	4	2	4	4	5	4	2	3	6	6	241
3	(Argentina) Braian Quevedo			4	2	2	2				2	2	7	1	1	4	212
4	(Argentina) Mateo Nuñez					3	3	3	3	2	3	6	5	4	Ret	4	139
5	(Argentina) Pablo Collazo	3	2	Ret	7	Ret	7	WD	WD	WD	Ret	DNS	Ret	6	4	6	124
6	(Argentina) Lucas Bohdanowicz			**1**	1	4	5	5	Ret	6	7	DNS	DNS			4	101
7	(Argentina) Gerónimo Nuñez										4	5	1	7	5	2	81
8	(Panama) Valentino Mini													**2**	2	1	74
9	(Argentina) Luciano Martínez	Ret	7†	7†	3	6	6									3	52
10	(Argentina) Thiago Martínez	5	3													1	51
11	(Argentina) Joaquín Bonnet							4	2	5						1	41
12	(Argentina) Pablo Grippo	4	6													1	41
13	(Bolivia) Rodrigo Gutiérrez										6	3	3			1	39
14	(Argentina) Tomás Pellandino							6	5	3						1	34
15	(Argentina) Bautista Damiani			5	6			7	6	Ret						2	34
16	(Argentina) Bautista Dose	DNP	5													1	21
17	(Argentina) Ayrton Chorne										8	Ret	4			1	17
18	(Argentina) Ramiro Alcaine	6	Ret													1	17
19	(Argentina) Lucas Yerobi							8	7	7						1	17
20	(Argentina) Ignacio Grippo			6	8											1	13
21	(Argentina) Cristobal Riestra					7†	DNS									1	7

Colour	Result
Gold	Winner
Silver	Second place
Bronze	Third place
Green	Points classification
Blue	Non-points classification
Blue	Non-classified finish (NC)
Purple	Retired, not classified (Ret)
Red	Did not qualify (DNQ)
Red	Did not pre-qualify (DNPQ)
Black	Disqualified (DSQ)
White	Did not start (DNS)
White	Withdrew (WD)
White	Race cancelled (C)
Blank	Did not practice (DNP)
Blank	Did not arrive (DNA)
Blank	Excluded (EX)

**Bold** – Pole
Italics – Fastest Lap
† — Did not finish but classified
