= 2025 Fórmula Nacional Argentina =

Motor racing competition

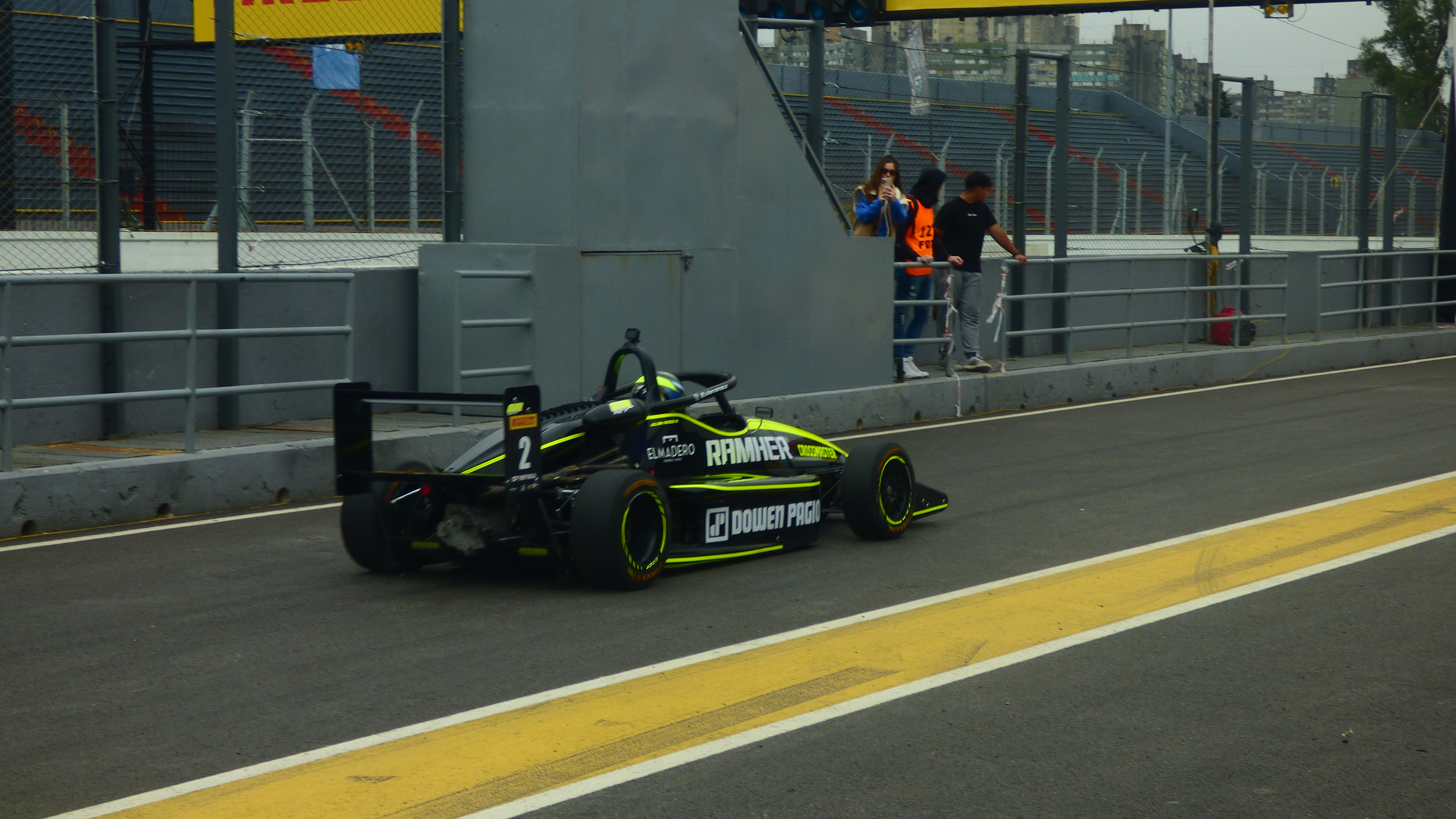
2024 runner-up Julián Ramos won the 2025 Drivers' Championship title driving for CB Racing.

The 2025 Fórmula Nacional Argentina was a multi-event Formula Renault 2.0 open-wheel single seater motor racing championship. The championship featured a mix of professional and amateur drivers. This championship was held under the Formula Renault Argentina moniker from 1980. This was the fourth season held under the Fórmula Nacional Argentina moniker.

The season started on 16 March at Autódromo de Concepción del Uruguay, was held over ten rounds and ended in December at Autódromo Eusebio Marcilla. 2024 runner-up Julián Ramos won the Drivers' Championship title driving for CB Racing, while MG Ramini defended their Teams' Championship title.

== Teams and drivers ==
All teams either ran a Tito-built chassis or a Crespi Tulia 25 chassis, both using a 1600cc Renault engine.

Team	No.	Driver	Rounds
CB Racing	2	(Argentina) Julián Ramos	All
CB Racing	3	(Argentina) "Chuck"	9–10
CB Racing	17	(Peru) Daniella Ore	1–5, 7–10
JD Sport Team	5	(Argentina) Damián Sabbioni	1–3, 7, 9–10
MG Ramini	9	(Argentina) Santiago Chiarello	2–10
MG Ramini	22	(Argentina) Ayrton Gardoqui	1, 3
MG Ramini	83	(Uruguay) Kevin Ferreyra	1–3
MG Ramini	317	(Argentina) Lautaro Campione	All
Escudería Fazzaro	14	(Argentina) Juan Cruz Farías	1–3, 7
MR Racing	16	(Argentina) Felipe Saloj	3–4, 7
MR Racing	27	(Argentina) Tomás Fernández	1–7
MR Racing	38	(Argentina) Emiliano Moreno	6
MR Racing	46	(Argentina) Bautista Faccioli	All
MR Racing	133	(Argentina) Pedro Marriezcurrena	All
Ferreira Motorsport	19	(Argentina) Stefano Cagnolo	1, 3–10
Bogliero Competición	21	(Argentina) Jorge Bogliero	5
Ubaldo Ayala Racing Team	23	(Argentina) Federico Díaz	5, 7–10
Fauro Sport	24	(Argentina) Manuel Álvarez Castaño	2–8
Jorge Typek Competición	24	(Argentina) Manuel Álvarez Castaño	1
Jorge Typek Competición	37	(Argentina) Tomás Campra	1
Jorge Typek Competición	72	(Argentina) Sofía Percara	4, 7
Jorge Typek Competición	77	(Argentina) Julio Velázquez	4
Jorge Typek Competición	90	(Argentina) Alejandro Guttlein	7, 9–10
Soncini Team	33	(Argentina) Valentina Funes	3–8
Soncini Team	133	(Argentina) Facundo Gutiérrez	7–8
Giavedoni Motor Sport	37	(Argentina) Tomás Campra	2–10
Marinucci Competición	66	(Argentina) Ramiro Marinucci	1, 7–10
RDQ Competition	86	(Argentina) Benjamín Squaglia	1
Grinovero Team	86	(Argentina) Benjamín Squaglia	2–10
Buenos Aires Racing	95	(Argentina) Santino Roberi	1–8
Domínguez Competition	99	(Argentina) Joaquín Domínguez	1
Porcelli Racing	111	(Argentina) Malek Fara	2–5
Naza López Competición	115	(Argentina) Nazareno López	1–5, 7–10

- Both RX Fórmula and SV Fórmula announced their entry into the championship ahead of the season, but did not field any drivers in any events.
- Iván Percara was originally announced to drive for Jorge Typek Competición, but did not enter any events.

== Race calendar ==
The initial calendar announcement only consisted of ten dates when the rounds would be held, with venues announced in the weeks leading up to the events and multiple dates changed later on. The final calendar consisted of ten events.

Round		Circuit	Date	Support bill	Map of circuit locations
1	R1	(Entre Ríos Province) Autódromo de Concepción del Uruguay, Concepción del Uruguay (Full Circuit)	15 March	Top Race V6; Top Race Series	2025 Fórmula Nacional Argentina is located in Argentina
1	R2	(Entre Ríos Province) Autódromo de Concepción del Uruguay, Concepción del Uruguay (Full Circuit)	16 March	Top Race V6; Top Race Series	2025 Fórmula Nacional Argentina is located in Argentina
2	R1	(Buenos Aires Province) Autódromo San Nicolás, San Nicolás de los Arroyos (Full Circuit)	26 April	Top Race V6; Top Race Series	2025 Fórmula Nacional Argentina is located in Argentina
2	R2	(Buenos Aires Province) Autódromo San Nicolás, San Nicolás de los Arroyos (Full Circuit)	27 April	Top Race V6; Top Race Series	2025 Fórmula Nacional Argentina is located in Argentina
3	R1	Autódromo Oscar y Juan Gálvez, Buenos Aires (Circuit No. 8)	24 May	TC2000 Championship	2025 Fórmula Nacional Argentina is located in Argentina
3	R2	Autódromo Oscar y Juan Gálvez, Buenos Aires (Circuit No. 8)	25 May	TC2000 Championship	2025 Fórmula Nacional Argentina is located in Argentina
4	R1	(Entre Ríos Province) Autódromo Ciudad de Concordia, Concordia (Short Circuit)	28 June	TC2000 Championship	2025 Fórmula Nacional Argentina is located in Argentina
4	R2	(Entre Ríos Province) Autódromo Ciudad de Concordia, Concordia (Short Circuit)	29 June	TC2000 Championship	2025 Fórmula Nacional Argentina is located in Argentina
5	R1	(Buenos Aires Province) Autódromo Ciudad de Nueve de Julio - Guillermo Yoyo Maldonado, Nueve de Julio (Full Circuit)	19 July	TC2000 Championship; Top Race V6	2025 Fórmula Nacional Argentina is located in Argentina
5	R2	(Buenos Aires Province) Autódromo Ciudad de Nueve de Julio - Guillermo Yoyo Maldonado, Nueve de Julio (Full Circuit)	20 July	TC2000 Championship; Top Race V6	2025 Fórmula Nacional Argentina is located in Argentina
6	R1	(Río Negro Province) Autódromo Parque Ciudad de General Roca, General Roca (Circuit No. 3)	16 August	TC2000 Championship; Fiat Competizione	2025 Fórmula Nacional Argentina is located in Argentina
6	R2	(Río Negro Province) Autódromo Parque Ciudad de General Roca, General Roca (Circuit No. 3)	17 August	TC2000 Championship; Fiat Competizione	2025 Fórmula Nacional Argentina is located in Argentina
7	R1	Autódromo Oscar y Juan Gálvez, Buenos Aires (Circuit No. 9 & Circuit No. 8)	27 September	TC2000 Championship; Top Race V6	2025 Fórmula Nacional Argentina is located in Argentina
7	R2	Autódromo Oscar y Juan Gálvez, Buenos Aires (Circuit No. 9 & Circuit No. 8)	28 September	TC2000 Championship; Top Race V6	2025 Fórmula Nacional Argentina is located in Argentina
8	R1	Autódromo Oscar y Juan Gálvez, Buenos Aires (Circuit No. 8)	1 November	Top Race V6; Top Race Series	2025 Fórmula Nacional Argentina is located in Argentina
8	R2	Autódromo Oscar y Juan Gálvez, Buenos Aires (Circuit No. 8)	2 November	Top Race V6; Top Race Series	2025 Fórmula Nacional Argentina is located in Argentina
9	R1	(Buenos Aires Province) Autódromo Eusebio Marcilla, Junín (Full Circuit)	19 December	TC2000 Championship; Top Race V6; Fiat Competizione	2025 Fórmula Nacional Argentina is located in Argentina
9	R2	(Buenos Aires Province) Autódromo Eusebio Marcilla, Junín (Full Circuit)	20 December	TC2000 Championship; Top Race V6; Fiat Competizione	2025 Fórmula Nacional Argentina is located in Argentina
10	R1	(Buenos Aires Province) Autódromo Eusebio Marcilla, Junín (Full Circuit)	20 December	TC2000 Championship; Top Race V6; Fiat Competizione	2025 Fórmula Nacional Argentina is located in Argentina
10	R2	(Buenos Aires Province) Autódromo Eusebio Marcilla, Junín (Full Circuit)	21 December	TC2000 Championship; Top Race V6; Fiat Competizione	2025 Fórmula Nacional Argentina is located in Argentina

== Race results ==
Round		Circuit	Pole position	Fastest lap	Winning driver	Winning team
1	R1	(Entre Ríos Province) Autódromo de Concepción del Uruguay (Full Circuit)		(Argentina) Nazareno López	(Argentina) Nazareno López	Naza López Competición
1	R2	(Entre Ríos Province) Autódromo de Concepción del Uruguay (Full Circuit)	(Argentina) Julián Ramos	(Argentina) Lautaro Campione	(Argentina) Lautaro Campione	MG Ramini
2	R1	(Buenos Aires Province) Autódromo San Nicolás (Full Circuit)		(Argentina) Santiago Chiarello	(Argentina) Manuel Álvarez Castaño	Fauro Sport
2	R2	(Buenos Aires Province) Autódromo San Nicolás (Full Circuit)	(Argentina) Manuel Álvarez Castaño	(Argentina) Santiago Chiarello	(Argentina) Santiago Chiarello	MG Ramini
3	R1	(Buenos Aires) Autódromo Oscar y Juan Gálvez (Circuit No. 8)		(Peru) Daniella Ore	(Argentina) Nazareno López	Naza López Competición
3	R2	(Buenos Aires) Autódromo Oscar y Juan Gálvez (Circuit No. 8)	(Argentina) Julián Ramos	(Argentina) Malek Fara	(Argentina) Manuel Álvarez Castaño	Fauro Sport
4	R1	(Entre Ríos Province) Autódromo Ciudad de Concordia (Full Circuit)		(Argentina) Julián Ramos	(Argentina) Julio Velázquez	Jorge Typek Competición
4	R2	(Entre Ríos Province) Autódromo Ciudad de Concordia (Full Circuit)	(Argentina) Julián Ramos	(Argentina) Julio Velázquez	(Argentina) Julián Ramos	CB Racing
5	R1	(Buenos Aires Province) Autódromo Ciudad de Nueve de Julio - Guillermo Yoyo Maldonado (Full Circuit)		(Argentina) Tomás Campra	(Argentina) Santiago Chiarello	MG Ramini
5	R2	(Buenos Aires Province) Autódromo Ciudad de Nueve de Julio - Guillermo Yoyo Maldonado (Full Circuit)	(Argentina) Tomás Campra	(Argentina) Julián Ramos	(Argentina) Santiago Chiarello	MG Ramini
6	R1	(Río Negro Province) Autódromo Parque Ciudad de General Roca (Circuit No. 3)		(Argentina) Santino Roberi	(Argentina) Julián Ramos	CB Racing
6	R2	(Río Negro Province) Autódromo Parque Ciudad de General Roca (Circuit No. 3)	(Argentina) Benjamín Squaglia	(Argentina) Benjamín Squaglia	(Argentina) Benjamín Squaglia	Grinovero Team
7	R1	(Buenos Aires) Autódromo Oscar y Juan Gálvez (Circuit No. 9 & Circuit No. 8)		(Argentina) Tomás Campra	(Argentina) Manuel Álvarez Castaño	Fauro Sport
7	R2	(Buenos Aires) Autódromo Oscar y Juan Gálvez (Circuit No. 9 & Circuit No. 8)	(Argentina) Tomás Campra	(Argentina) Santiago Chiarello	(Argentina) Tomás Campra	Jorge Typek Competición
8	R1	(Buenos Aires) Autódromo Oscar y Juan Gálvez (Circuit No. 8)		(Argentina) Stefano Cagnolo	(Argentina) Stefano Cagnolo	Ferreira Motorsport
8	R2	(Buenos Aires) Autódromo Oscar y Juan Gálvez (Circuit No. 8)	(Peru) Daniella Ore	(Argentina) Tomás Campra	(Argentina) Julián Ramos	CB Racing
9	R1	(Buenos Aires Province) Autódromo Eusebio Marcilla (Full Circuit)		(Argentina) Tomás Campra	(Argentina) "Chuck"	CB Racing
9	R2	(Buenos Aires Province) Autódromo Eusebio Marcilla (Full Circuit)	(Argentina) Nazareno López	(Argentina) Tomás Campra	(Argentina) Julián Ramos	CB Racing
10	R1	(Buenos Aires Province) Autódromo Eusebio Marcilla (Full Circuit)		(Argentina) Lautaro Campione	(Argentina) Nazareno López	Naza López Competición
10	R2	(Buenos Aires Province) Autódromo Eusebio Marcilla (Full Circuit)	(Argentina) Tomás Campra	(Argentina) Nazareno López	(Argentina) Nazareno López	Naza López Competición

== Season report ==
=== First half ===
The 2025 season of Fórmula Nacional Argentina began at Autódromo de Concepción del Uruguay with CB Racing's Julián Ramos leading MG Ramini's Lautaro Campione in qualifying. The first race began with Nazareno López, driving for the eponymous Naza López Competición team, moving from third to first place. From that point on, he led the rest of the race to take his maiden win ahead of Ramos and MR Racing's Bautista Faccioli. The second race was won by Campione, who was able to move past Ramos after the latter struggled with car damage. He still managed to take second to leave the round with a 16-point championship lead, while Buenos Aires Racing's Santino Roberi took third.

The Autódromo San Nicolás hosted round two, where Fauro Sport's Manuel Álvarez Castaño took his maiden pole position in qualifying. That saw him start eighth in the first race, and he rose to the front to claim his maiden victory on the same day, leading Porcelli Racing's Malek Fara and Ramos. He had less pace in race two, dropping from pole position to seventh at the chequered flag, allowing MG Ramini's Santiago Chiarello to take the win ahead of Fara and CB Racing's Daniella Ore after starting fourth. Championship leader Ramos failed to finish the race, but still managed to grow his championship lead to 17 points after second-placed Campione had a similarly bad weekend.

Round three was held at Autódromo Oscar y Juan Gálvez. Ramos was back on top in qualifying to take another pole position, ahead of Jorge Typek's Tomás Campra and Ore. Victory in the first race went the way of López, who started in fourth place and steadily moved up the order to take victory. Ore and Campione followed within a second of the leader to complete the podium. Race two saw a big shakeup in the results when both Ramos and Ore were disqualified for procedural breaches. That meant Álvarez Castaño was able to take the victory ahead of Fara and Campra. His win also saw him move into the lead of the championship standings by a single point over Ramos.

Teams and drivers then travelled to Autódromo Ciudad de Concordia, where Ramos claimed pole position in qualifying once again, this time ahead of Chiarello. The first race was shaped by a battle between the Jorge Typek pair of Julio Velázquez and Sofía Percara, with the former coming out on top to take his maiden series victory. Ramos took second, retaking the championship lead, while Chiarello completed the podium. Ramos then dominated the second race, leading Velázquez to take his first win of the year. With Álvarez Castaño third after only managing seventh in race one, Ramos had now rebuilt a 16-point cushion over the pre-event standings leader.

The first half of the season ended at Autódromo Ciudad de Nueve de Julio with a maiden pole position for Campra. The first race saw a remarkable victory for defending champion Chiarello, who started fifth and moved up the order through the race, leading MR Racing's Tomás Fernández and Ramos at the finish. He doubled up in race two, spending the opening part of the race conserving his tires to attack at the end. His tenth series victory saw him take second place in the standings. Polesitter Campra faded to ninth, while Ramos finished second, adding consistent points to his championship lead which now stood at 29 points. Fara completed the podium in third.

=== Second half ===
Up next was round six, held at Autódromo Parque Ciudad de General Roca, which saw another maiden polesitter in Grinovero Team's Benjamín Squaglia. He continued his pace in the first race, following up his qualifying success with a second place, only bested by championship leader Ramos. Álvarez Castaño completed the podium, returning to the front after a weekend off the pace. Squaglia converted his pole position into a maiden victory after fending off Álvarez Castaño all race. Still, second place ahead MR Racing's Pedro Marriezcurrena was enough for the latter to retake second place in the standings, albeit now 36 points behind runaway leader Ramos, who finished the race in sixth place.

Fórmula Nacional then returned to Buenos Aires for two more race weekends. Campra managed the wet conditions in qualifying to claim pole position for round seven, ahead of López and Ramos. The opening race initially saw a win for Ore, but she was disqualified for a technical infringement. That promoted Álvarez Castaño to the top spot, ahead of López and Ubaldo Ayala's Federico Díaz. Campra then converted his pole position to a maiden win in the category in race two, leading Ore, who had started seventh and moved up the order to bounce back from her disqualification, and standings leader Ramos, who now held a 38-point lead over Álvarez Castaño in the championship.

Ore claimed her maiden pole position ahead of Campra and Ramos in qualifying for the series' third round at Buenos Aires. A maiden polesitter was followed by a maiden race winner in the first race, with Ferreira Motorsport's Stefano Cagnolo making the most of his fourth-place start to lead Campra and Campione to victory. Ore could not convert her pole position into a win in race two, instead fading to finish eleventh. Ramos won a race-long battle for the lead between him and Álvarez Castaño to take win number three of his campaign. Faccioli returned to the podium for the first time since the season opener in third as Ramos grew his championship lead over Álvarez Castaño to 59 points.

Two rounds and four races held at the Autódromo Eusebio Marcilla across a single weekend rounded out the season, and pole position in the opening qualifying session went to López. The first race was won by a series debutant for CB Racing, competing under the pseudonym "Chuck". He had started the race second and moved past Campione into the lead to take the win ahead of Díaz and López. Ramos was sixth, but with Álvarez Castaño missing the final two rounds, the title was already almost his. He confirmed that by winning the second race of the weekend, leading Campra and polesitter López to claim the championship title with two races to spare.

Fresh off the back of his championship success, Ramos went on to claim the final pole position of the year for the last two races at Junín. That handed Marriezcurrena reversed-grid pole position for the first race, but he faded to eighth during the race. López was the first to move past him, claiming a lead he would not relinquish as he won the race ahead of Campra and Chiarello. Polesitter Ramos then had a similar race to Marriezcurrena in race two, also dropping down the order to finish ninth. López was the beneficiary once again as he claimed another victory, while Campra secured the runner-up spot in the championship with second and "Chuck" completed the final podium of the season in third.

== Championship standings ==
=== Scoring system ===
Every driver taking part in qualifying or in one of the two races of a weekend and setting a time was awarded five points.

==== Qualifying points ====
Each qualifying session awarded one point to the fastest driver. Afterwards, the five fastest drivers took part in the "super qualifying" session, each setting one lap to set the top five positions. These five drivers were also awarded points, provided they set a lap:

Position in qualifying / **1st**; Points / 1	Position in super qualifying / **1st** / **2nd** / **3rd** / **4th** / **5th**; Points / 5 / 4 / 3 / 2 / 1

==== Race points ====
Position	**1st**	**2nd**	**3rd**	**4th**	**5th**	**6th**	**7th**	**8th**	**9th**	**10th**	**11th**	**12th**	**13th**	**14th**	**15th**
Points	25	20	17	15	13	11	9	8	7	6	5	4	3	2	1

The worst weekends points-wise of each driver was dropped. Rounds where a driver was excluded or disqualified from a race were not allowed to be dropped.

=== Drivers' Championship ===
Pos	Driver	CDU (Entre Ríos Province)		SNA (Buenos Aires Province)		BUA1 (Buenos Aires)		CCD (Entre Ríos Province)		NDJ (Buenos Aires Province)		GRO (Río Negro Province)		BUA2 (Buenos Aires)		BUA3 (Buenos Aires)		JUN1 (Buenos Aires Province)		JUN2 (Buenos Aires Province)		Pts
Pos	Driver	R1	R2	R1	R2	R1	R2	R1	R2	R1	R2	R1	R2	R1	R2	R1	R2	R1	R2	R1	R2	Pts
1	(Argentina) Julián Ramos	2	**2**^{1}	(3)	(Ret^{3})	10	**DSQ***^{1}	2	**1***^{1}	3	2	1	6^{5}	8	3^{3}	4	1^{3}	6	1^{2}	5	**9**^{1}	363
2	(Argentina) Tomás Campra	(5)	(Ret)	7	5^{4}	9	3^{2}	15	4^{3}	6	**9**^{1}	6	4	4	**1**^{1}	2	6*^{2}	11	2^{3}	2	2*^{2}	319
3	(Argentina) Santiago Chiarello			5	1^{5}	4	5	3	15^{2}	1	1^{4}	7	10^{3}	6	4	6	9^{5}	Ret	10	3	5	285
4	(Argentina) Nazareno López	1	Ret	6	6	1	Ret^{5}	5	5	Ret	14			2	11^{2}	5	15	3	**3**^{1}	1	1	278
5	(Argentina) Manuel Álvarez Castaño	Ret	9	1	**7***^{1}	12	1^{4}	7	3	8	8^{3}	3	2^{2}	1	EX*^{4}	DNS	2					252
6	(Argentina) Lautaro Campione	Ret	1^{2}	4	13	3	13	6	8	4	11^{5}	9	DSQ	(5)	(Ret)	3	14	4	4	4	4	239
7	(Argentina) Benjamín Squaglia	6	4	9	9	7	Ret	DNS	9	Ret	10	2	**1***^{1}	7	12	10	7	8	5	(Ret)	(Ret)	207
8	(Argentina) Bautista Faccioli	3	DSQ^{3}	Ret	14^{2}	(DNS)	(Ret)	9	6	7	12	8	7^{4}	10	7	9	3	5	8	6	8	201
9	(Argentina) Pedro Marriezcurrena	8	5	8	10	11	7	14	11	10	7	5	3	12	8	(Ret)	(Ret)	7	9	8	12	186
10	(Argentina) Santino Roberi	7	3	13	8	8	8	DNS	17	9	5	11	5	9	9	8	8					161
11	(Argentina) Stefano Cagnolo	Ret	Ret			Ret	6	11	DNS^{5}	Ret	Ret	4	8	19	Ret	1	4^{4}	9	11	7	11^{4}	155
12	(Peru) Daniella Ore	DNS	7	Ret	3	2	DSQ^{3}	10	14	11	Ret			DSQ	2	Ret	**11**^{1}	DNS	Ret	DNS	7	146
13	(Argentina) Malek Fara			2	2	Ret	2	12	7	5	3*^{2}											128
14	(Argentina) Federico Díaz									Ret	6			3	Ret	7	13	2	6*^{4}	9	6^{3}	120
15	(Argentina) Tomás Fernández	9	Ret*	Ret	12	6	9	4	10^{4}	2	4	12†	Ret	WD	WD							120
16	(Argentina) Valentina Funes					14	10	16	13	12	13	10	9	14	Ret	12	10					73
17	(Argentina) "Chuck"																	1	7^{5}	Ret	3^{5}	63
18	(Uruguay) Kevin Ferreyra	Ret	8	11	4	16	4															58
19	(Argentina) Damián Sabbioni	Ret	6	12	11	Ret	11							18	14			10	Ret	DSQ	Ret	58
20	(Argentina) Julio Velázquez							1	2													50
21	(Argentina) Ramiro Marinucci	WD	WD											15	6	11	5	DNS	Ret	WD	WD	45
22	(Argentina) Juan Cruz Farías	DNS	Ret	10	15	13	12							11	16							39
23	(Argentina) Ayrton Gardoqui	4	Ret			5	Ret															38
24	(Argentina) Alejandro Guttlein													Ret	5^{5}			Ret	Ret	Ret	10	35
25	(Argentina) Felipe Saloj					15	Ret	13	12					17	13							26
26	(Argentina) Sofía Percara							8	16					16	10							24
27	(Argentina) Facundo Gutiérrez													13	15	Ret	12					18
28	(Argentina) Emiliano Moreno											Ret	11									10
—	(Argentina) Joaquín Domínguez	WD	WD																			0
—	(Argentina) Jorge Bogliero									WD	WD											0
Pos	Driver	R1	R2	R1	R2	R1	R2	R1	R2	R1	R2	R1	R2	R1	R2	R1	R2	R1	R2	R1	R2	Pts
Pos	Driver	CDU (Entre Ríos Province)		SNA (Buenos Aires Province)		BUA1 (Buenos Aires)		CCD (Entre Ríos Province)		NDJ (Buenos Aires Province)		GRO (Río Negro Province)		BUA2 (Buenos Aires)		BUA3 (Buenos Aires)		JUN1 (Buenos Aires Province)		JUN2 (Buenos Aires Province)		Pts

Colour	Result
Gold	Winner
Silver	Second place
Bronze	Third place
Green	Points classification
Blue	Non-points classification
Blue	Non-classified finish (NC)
Purple	Retired, not classified (Ret)
Red	Did not qualify (DNQ)
Red	Did not pre-qualify (DNPQ)
Black	Disqualified (DSQ)
White	Did not start (DNS)
White	Withdrew (WD)
White	Race cancelled (C)
Blank	Did not practice (DNP)
Blank	Did not arrive (DNA)
Blank	Excluded (EX)

**Bold** – Pole
Italics – Fastest Lap
* – fastest in qualifying
^{1 2 3 4 5} – super qualifying positions

=== Teams' Championship ===
Pos	Team	Pts
1	MG Ramini	563
2	CB Racing	509
3	MR Racing	455
4	Fauro Sport	395
5	Giavedoni Motor Sport	319
6	Naza López Competición	278
7	Ferreira Motorsport	214
8	Buenos Aires Racing	161
9	Ubaldo Ayala Racing Team	136
10	Porcelli Racing	128
11	Jorge Typek Competición	123
12	Soncini Team	91
13	JD Sport Team	63
14	Marinucci Competición	40
15	Escudería Fazzaro	39
16	Grinovero Team	33
17	RDQ Competition	31
—	Domínguez Competition	0
—	Bogliero Competición	0
