= Autódromo de Concepción del Uruguay =

Argentine racing circuit

- Full Circuit (2014–present)
- Location: Concepción del Uruguay, Argentina
- Capacity: 75,000
- Broke ground: 2013
- Opened: 18 May 2014; 12 years ago
- Major events: Current: Turismo Carretera (2014–2019, 2021–present); TC Mouras (2014–2020, 2023, 2026); Former: TCR South America (2021); TC2000 (2022, 2024); Top Race V6 (2015–2016, 2020–2025); Turismo Nacional (2015, 2018, 2021, 2023); TC2000 Series (2015–2019, 2022); F4 Argentina (2021)

Full Circuit (2014–present)
- Length: 4.279 km (2.659 mi)
- Turns: 9
- Race lap record: 1:25.102 ( (Argentina) Germán Todino, Ford Mustang Mach 1, 2025, TC)

No. 3 Circuit (2014–present)
- Length: 3.220 km (2.001 mi)
- Turns: 7

No. 5 Circuit (2014–present)
- Length: 2.480 km (1.541 mi)
- Turns: 6

The Autódromo de Concepción del Uruguay is a 4.279 km (2.659 mi) racing circuit for motorsport competitions, located on the outskirts of the city of Concepción del Uruguay, in the Argentine Province of Entre Ríos. The circuit is one of three in the province, with the two other courses being in Paraná and Concordia, both of which are considered national category racing circuits. The circuit was formerly the longest circuit in the province until the circuit in Concordia was reconfigured, with the new length being 4.700 km (2.920 mi), 0.421 km (0.262 mi) longer than the Autódromo de Concepción del Uruguay in its full layout.

== History ==
The circuit was built in 2014 for the Turismo Carretera and TC Pista competitions, with its additional objectives being bringing regional motorsport competitions together, as well as enticing larger motorsport competitions to host a round in the province. A round has been hosted at the circuit every year since and as of 2019, a round of the Argentinian Rallycross Championship (Campeonato Argentino de Rallycross) has been hosted on a new mixed-surface layout of the circuit.

== Events ==
Current

- March: TC Mouras, TC Pista Mouras, TC Junior
- April: Turismo Carretera, Turismo Carretera Pista, Fórmula 2 Argentina

Former

- F4 Argentina Championship (2021)
- Fórmula Nacional Argentina (2022, 2024–2025)
- TC2000 Championship (2022, 2024)
- TC2000 Series (2015–2019, 2022)
- TCR South America Touring Car Championship (2021)
- Top Race V6 (2015–2016, 2020–2025)
- Turismo Nacional (2015, 2018, 2021, 2023)
- Turismo Pista (2014–2019, 2021–2025)

== Lap records ==
As of July 2025, the fastest official race lap records at the Autódromo de Concepción del Uruguay are listed as:

Category	Time	Driver	Vehicle	Event
Full Circuit (2014–present): 4.279 km (2.659 mi)
Turismo Carretera	1:25.102	Germán Todino	Ford Mustang Mach 1	2025 Concepción del Uruguay Turismo Carretera round
Formula 4	1:27.091	Federico Hermida	Mygale M14-F4	2021 1st Concepción del Uruguay F4 Argentina round
TC2000	1:27.801	Leonel Pernia	Renault Fluence GT	2022 Concepción del Uruguay TC2000 round
Formula Renault 2.0	1:29.061	Stefano Polini	Tito F4-A	2025 Concepción del Uruguay Fórmula 2 Argentina round
TCR Touring Car	1:29.792	Raphael Reis	Honda Civic Type R TCR (FK8)	2021 Concepción del Uruguay TCR South America round
Turismo Nacional Clase 3	1:33.282	Jerónimo Teti	Chevrolet Cruze II	2023 Concepción del Uruguay Turismo Nacional round
Turismo Nacional Clase 2	1:36.343	Lucas Petracchini	Toyota Etios	2023 Concepción del Uruguay Turismo Nacional round
