= Autódromo Ciudad de Concordia =

- Full Circuit (2014–present)

- Full Circuit (1992–2011)
- Location: Concordia, Entre Ríos, Argentina
- Coordinates: 31°18′29.02″S 58°0′18.07″W
- Owner: Automoto Club de Concordia
- Opened: 4 May 1969; 57 years ago Re-opened: 2 October 2012; 13 years ago
- Closed: 2010
- Major events: Current: TCR South America (2026); TC2000 (1981–1983, 1986, 1988–1989, 1992, 2004–2005, 2022, 2024–present); Top Race V6 (2005, 2009, 2023–present); Former: Turismo Nacional (1969–1973, 1980, 1984, 1990, 1992–1993, 1996–2009, 2013–2015, 2017, 2019, 2021, 2023–2025); Turismo Carretera (2014–2019, 2021–2022); TC2000 Series (2013–2018, 2022); F4 Argentina (2021); F3 Sudamericana (1992, 2013)

Full Circuit (2014–present)
- Length: 4.700 km (2.920 mi)
- Turns: 14
- Race lap record: 1:42.483 ( (Argentina) Germán Todino, Torino Cherokee, 2022, TC)

Short Circuit (1981–1991, 2012–present)
- Length: 3.120 km (1.939 mi)
- Turns: 10
- Race lap record: 1:12.644 ( (Argentina) Lucas Colombo Russell, Fiat Linea, 2013, TC2000 Series)

Full Circuit (1992–2011)
- Length: 3.150 km (1.957 mi)
- Turns: 12
- Race lap record: 1:16.865 ( (Argentina) Diego Aventín, Ford Focus, 2004, TC2000)

Original Circuit (1969–1980)
- Length: 2.550 km (1.584 mi)
- Turns: 7

Autódromo Ciudad de Concordia is a motorsports circuit located 4 km (2.5 mi) north of Concordia, Entre Ríos, Argentina. The circuit also used to host the Formula 3 Sudamericana. The track has 14 corners and it is 4.700 km (2.920 mi) long. The circuit was opened in May 1969. The circuit was closed in 2010, reopened in October 2012, and extended in 2014.

== Events ==
Current

- April: Turismo Pista, Turismo Carretera 2000
- May: TC2000 Championship, Top Race V6, Fórmula Nacional Argentina
- September: TCR South America Touring Car Championship

Former

- Copa Mégane Argentina (2005)
- F4 Argentina Championship (2021)
- Formula 3 Sudamericana (1992, 2013)
- Formula 4 Sudamericana (2014)
- Porsche GT3 Cup Trophy Argentina (2018)
- TC2000 Series (2013–2018, 2022)
- Turismo Carretera (2014–2019, 2021–2022)
- Turismo Carretera Pista (2014–2019, 2021–2022)
- Turismo Nacional (1969–1973, 1980, 1984, 1990, 1992–1993, 1996–2009, 2013–2015, 2017, 2019, 2021, 2023–2025)

== Lap records ==
As of September 2026, the fastest official race lap records at the Autódromo Ciudad de Concordia are listed as:

| Category | Time | Driver | Vehicle | Event |
Full Circuit (2012–present): 4.700 km (2.920 mi)
| Turismo Carretera | 1:42.483 | Germán Todino | Torino Cherokee | 2022 Concordia Turismo Carretera round |
| TC2000 | 1:42.762 | Emiliano Stang | Toyota Corolla Cross GR-S | 2025 Concordia TC2000 round |
| TCR Touring Car | 1:43.811 | Camilo Trappa | Hyundai Elantra N TCR (2024) | 2026 Concordia TCR South America round |
| Porsche Carrera Cup | 1:43.985 | Juan Pipkin | Porsche 911 (991 I) GT3 Cup | 2018 Concordia Porsche GT3 Cup Trophy Argentina round |
| Formula Renault 2.0 | 1:44.198 | Emiliano Marino | Tito F4-A | 2016 Concordia Formula Renault Argentina round |
| Top Race V6 | 1:48.398 | Diego Javier Azar | Lexus ES XV60 | 2023 Concordia Top Race V6 round |
Short Circuit (1981–1991, 2012–present): 3.120 km (1.939 mi)
| TC2000 Series | 1:12.644 | Lucas Colombo Russell | Fiat Linea | 2013 Concordia TC2000 Series round |
| Formula 4 | 1:12.709 | Pablo Collazo | Mygale M14-F4 | 2021 Concordia F4 Argentina round |
| Formula Renault 2.0 | 1:14.937 | Julián Ramos | Tito F4-A | 2025 Concordia Fórmula Nacional Argentina round |
Full Circuit (1992–2011): 3.150 km (1.957 mi)
| TC2000 | 1:16.865 | Diego Aventín | Ford Focus | 2004 Concordia TC2000 round |
| Formula Three | 1:16.890 | Marcos Gueiros | Ralt RT34 | 1992 Concordia F3 Sudamericana round |
| Formula Renault 1.6 | 1:20.324 | Pablo Fioquetta | Crespi K4M | 2005 Concordia Formula Renault 1.6 Argentina round |
| Copa Mégane Argentina | 1:26.355 | Marcelo Furlan | Renault Mégane | 2005 Concordia Copa Mégane Argentina round |
