= Fabricio Pezzini =

Argentine auto racing driver

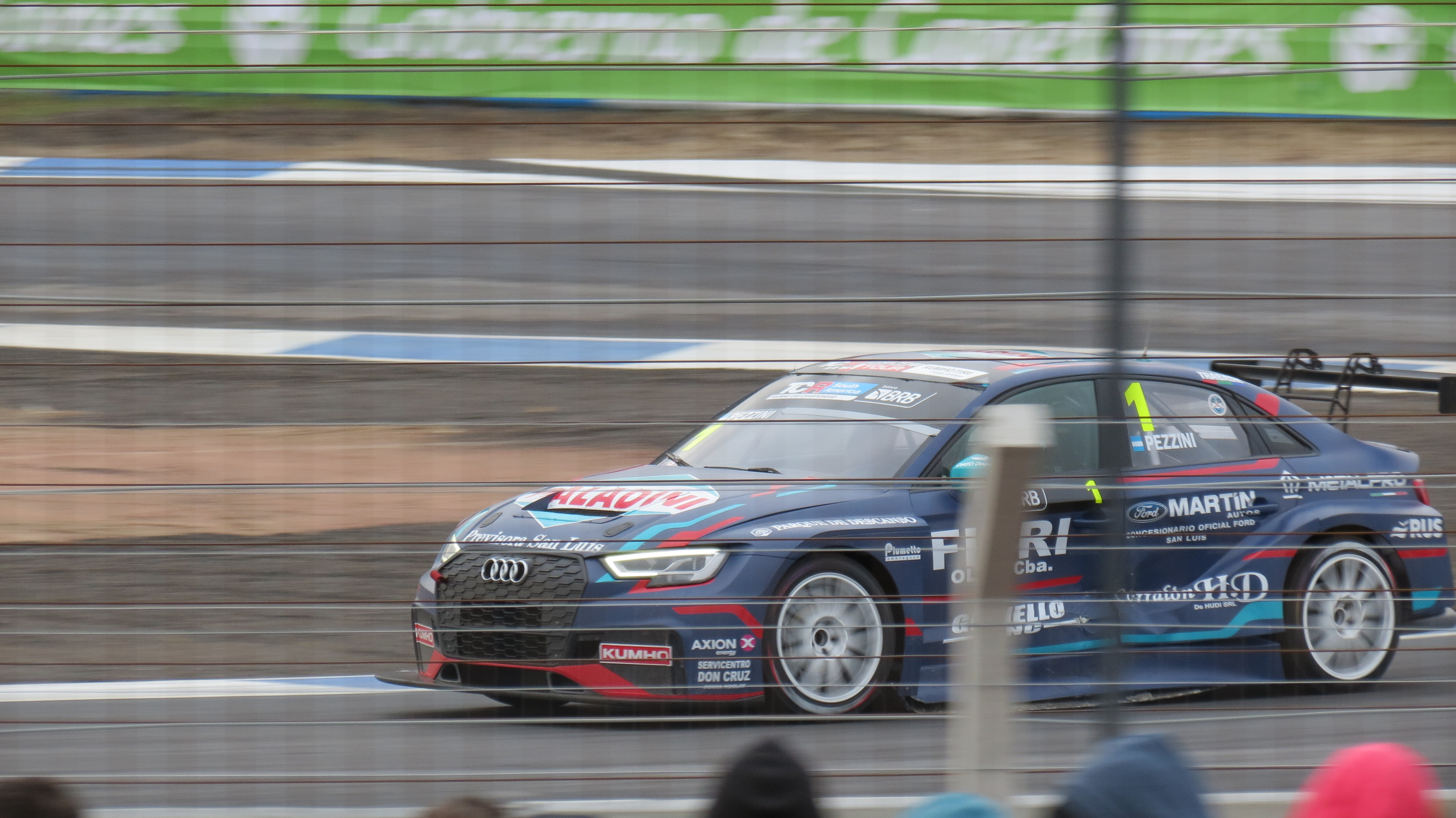
- Pezzini during the 2023 El Pinar TCR World Tour round
- Nationality: (Argentina) Argentine
- Born: November 13, 1978 (age 47)

TCR South America Touring Car Championship career
- Debut season: 2021
- Current team: PMO Motorsport
- Championships: 1
- Wins: 4
- Podiums: 11

Previous series
- Turismo Nacional, TC2000/Súper TC2000, TC Pista Fórmula Renault Argentina

Championship titles
- 2022: TCR South America Touring Car Championship

Fabricio Pezzini (Río Cuarto, Córdoba; November 13, 1978) is an Argentine motor racing driver. He competed in national series such as Formula Renault Argentina, TC Pista, TC2000 and Turismo Nacional (Clase 3).

Pezzini's main achievement is winning the 2022 TCR South America Touring Car Championship.

== Racing record ==
=== Racing career summary ===
Season	Series	Team	Races	Wins	Poles	F/Laps	Podiums	Points	Position
1997	Fórmula Renault Argentina	?	?	0	0	0	0	11	19th
1998	Fórmula Renault Argentina	?	9	0	0	0	0	11	26th
1999	Fórmula Renault Argentina	?	6	1	1	1	3	61	5th
2000	Fórmula Renault Argentina	?	12	3	0	4	6	110	3rd
2001	TC Pista	?	11	1	2	1	3	82.5	10th
2002	TC Pista	?	?	1	0	0	1	30	21st
2002	TC2000	Belloso Competición	7	0	0	0	0	0	NC
2003	TC Pista	?	5	1	0	0	2	38	19th
2003	TC2000	Pro Rally	4	0	0	0	0	7	24th
2004	TC2000	MD Racing	9	0	0	0	0	0	NC
2005	TC2000	Italcred Fineschi Racing Team	13	0	0	0	0	4	23rd
2006	TC2000	Fineschi Racing	4	0	0	0	0	0	NC
2006	Turismo Nacional - Clase 3	Pezzini Competición	7	0	0	0	0	56	22nd
2007	Turismo Nacional - Clase 3	?	11	0	1	0	0	121	11th
2008	TC2000	Bainotti Dowen Pagio	5	0	0	0	0	0	NC
2008	Turismo Nacional - Clase 3	?	7	0	0	0	0	21	36th
2009	TC2000	Escudería Río de la Plata Vitelli Competición	7	0	0	0	0	8	21st
2009	Turismo Nacional - Clase 3	Pezzini Competición	8	0	0	0	0	55	23rd
2010	TC2000	Escudería Río de la Plata	2	0	0	0	0	0	NC
2010	Turismo Nacional - Clase 3	FP Competición	8	0	0	0	0	25	40th
2011	TC2000	Orbis Seguros Racing	3	0	0	0	0	0	NC
2011	Turismo Nacional - Clase 3	?	11	0	0	0	0	96	13th
2012	Súper TC2000	Escudería Río de la Plata	1	0	0	0	0	0	NC
2012	Turismo Nacional - Clase 3	FP Competición	12	0	0	0	4	173	5th
2013	Turismo Nacional - Clase 3	Pezzini Competición	12	0	0	0	0	148	7th
2014	Turismo Nacional - Clase 3	Pezzini Competición	11	0	0	0	0	31	30th
2015	Turismo Nacional - Clase 3	GR Competición	9	0	0	0	0	37	31st
2016	Súper TC2000	Escudería Río de la Plata	1	0	0	0	0	18	22nd
2016	Turismo Nacional - Clase 3	?	11	1	0	1	1	126	16th
2017	Súper TC2000	Fiat Petronas	1	0	0	0	0	0	NC
2017	Turismo Nacional - Clase 3	Pezzini Competición	12	0	0	0	0	75.5	21st
2017	TC2000	?	2	0	0	0	0	1.5	33rd
2018	Turismo Nacional - Clase 3	Tito Bessone Carrera Toyota Team	12	1	0	0	3	189.5	6th
2019	Turismo Nacional - Clase 3	Tito Bessone Toyota Team	9	1	0	0	1	157	10th
2020	Turismo Nacional - Clase 3	Tito Bessone Carrera Toyota Racing	8	0	0	0	0	93	14th
2021	TCR South America Touring Car Championship	PMO Motorsport	4	2	1	0	2	90	7th
2021	Turismo Nacional - Clase 3	Bessone Toyota Racing	10	0	0	0	0	143	15th
2022	TCR South America Touring Car Championship	PMO Motorsport	14	2	1	1	9	486	1st
2022	Turismo Nacional - Clase 3	Tito Bessone Toyota Racing	2	0	0	0	1	33	38th
2023	TCR South America Touring Car Championship	PMO Motorsport	4	0	0	0	0	112	14th
2023	TCR South America Touring Car Championship	Paladini Racing	5	0	0	0	0	112	14th
2023	TCR World Tour	Paladini Racing	2	0	0	0	0	0	NC
2024	TCR South America Touring Car Championship	Paladini Racing	3	0	0	0	0	11	51st
2024	Turismo Nacional - Clase 3	Scuderia Prema							
2026	TCR South America Touring Car Championship	Paladini Racing							

Sporting positions
Preceded by Pepe Oriola	TCR South America Touring Car Championship; Champion; 2022	Succeeded by
