= 2023 El Pinar TCR World Tour round =

Fifth round of 2023 TCR World Tour

(Uruguay) 2023 El Pinar TCR World Tour round
Race details
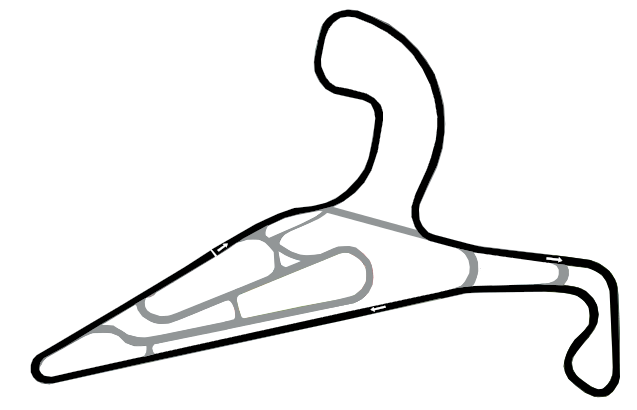
- Round 5 of 9 in the 2023 World Touring Car Championship at Autódromo Víctor Borrat Fabini in El Pinar, Uruguay.
- Date: 18–20 August, 2023
- Location: El Pinar, Uruguay
- Course: Autódromo Víctor Borrat Fabini; 3.120 kilometres (1.939 mi)

Race One
- Laps: 20
Pole position
Driver		(Uruguay) Santiago Urrutia	Cyan Racing
Time		1:19.800	
Podium
First		(Uruguay) Santiago Urrutia	Cyan Racing
Second		(Sweden) Thed Björk	Cyan Racing
Third		(Belgium) Frédéric Vervisch	Comtoyou Racing
Fastest Lap
Driver		(Uruguay) Santiago Urrutia	Cyan Racing
Time		1:20.774	

Race Two
- Laps: 21
Podium
First		(China) Ma Qinghua	Cyan Racing
Second		(Spain) Mikel Azcona	BRC Racing Team
Third		(France) Yann Ehrlacher	Cyan Racing
Fastest Lap
Driver		(Spain) Mikel Azcona	BRC Racing Team
Time		1:20.797	

The 2023 El Pinar TCR World Tour round was the fifth round of the 2023 TCR World Tour. It was held on 18–20 August 2023 at the Autódromo Víctor Borrat Fabini in El Pinar, Uruguay. The event was also the sixth round of the 2023 TCR South America Touring Car Championship. Santiago Urrutia scored pole position for Cyan Racing Lynk&Co. Urrutia managed to keep his lead, winning the first race. Urrutia's teammate Ma Qing Hua won the second race after leading from the start, scoring his first win of the season.

== Entry list ==
A total of 30 cars have been entered, including entries from TCR World Tour and TCR South America.

Team	Car	No.	Drivers
(Argentina) Paladini Racing	Audi RS 3 LMS TCR (2017)	1	(Argentina) Fabricio Pezzini
(Argentina) Paladini Racing	Toyota GR Corolla Sport TCR	2	(Argentina) Juan Ángel Rosso
(Argentina) Paladini Racing	Toyota GR Corolla Sport TCR	5	(Argentina) Fabián Yannantuoni
(Argentina) PMO Motorsport	Lynk & Co 03 TCR	8	(Brazil) Rafael Suzuki
(Brazil) Cobra Racing Team	Toyota GR Corolla Sport TCR	10	(Brazil) Adalberto Baptista
(Italy) Alfa Racing	Alfa Romeo Giulietta Veloce TCR	13	(Uruguay) Carlos Silva
(Argentina) Squadra Martino	Honda Civic Type R TCR (FK8)	15	(Uruguay) Enrique Maglione
Toyota Team Argentina	Toyota GR Corolla Sport TCR	17	(Argentina) Bernardo Llaver
(Argentina) Squadra Martino	Honda Civic Type R TCR (FK8)	23	(Argentina) Ignacio Montenegro
(Argentina) PMO Motorsport	Lynk & Co 03 TCR	24	(Uruguay) Frederick Balbi
(Brazil) W2 ProGP	CUPRA Leon Competicion TCR	28	(Brazil) Galid Osman
Toyota Team Argentina	Toyota GR Corolla Sport TCR	33	(Argentina) José Manuel Sapag
(Argentina) Squadra Martino	Honda Civic Type R TCR (FK8)	34	(Brazil) Fabio Casagrande
(Argentina) PMO Racing	Peugeot 308 TCR	35	(Uruguay) Gonzalo Reilly
(Argentina) PMO Racing	Peugeot 308 TCR	36	(Argentina) Damián Fineschi
(Brazil) Scuderia Chiarelli	Hyundai Elantra N TCR	43	(Brazil) Pedro Cardoso
(Argentina) Squadra Martino	Honda Civic Type R TCR (FK8)	60	(Uruguay) Juan Manuel Casella
(Brazil) Cobra Racing Team	Toyota GR Corolla Sport TCR	70	(Brazil) Diego Nunes
(Brazil) W2 ProGP	CUPRA Leon Competicion TCR	77	(Brazil) Raphael Reis
(Argentina) Bratton Tito Bessone Team	Toyota GR Corolla Sport TCR	86	(Argentina) Esteban Guerrieri
(Italy) Alfa Racing	Alfa Romeo Giulietta Veloce TCR	90	(Uruguay) Michell Bonnin
(Italy) BRC Hyundai N Squadra Corse	Hyundai Elantra N TCR	105	(Hungary) Norbert Michelisz
(Sweden) Cyan Racing Lynk&Co	Lynk & Co 03 FL TCR	111	(Sweden) Thed Björk
(Sweden) Cyan Racing Lynk&Co	Lynk & Co 03 FL TCR	112	(Uruguay) Santiago Urrutia
(Belgium) Audi Sport Team Comtoyou	Audi RS 3 LMS TCR (2021)	122	(Belgium) Frédéric Vervisch
(Argentina) Squadra Martino	Honda Civic Type R TCR (FL5)	129	(Argentina) Néstor Girolami
(Sweden) Cyan Racing Lynk&Co	Lynk & Co 03 FL TCR	155	(China) Ma Qing Hua
(Sweden) Cyan Racing Lynk&Co	Lynk & Co 03 FL TCR	168	(France) Yann Ehrlacher
(Belgium) Audi Sport Team Comtoyou	Audi RS 3 LMS TCR (2021)	179	(United Kingdom) Robert Huff
(Italy) BRC Hyundai N Squadra Corse	Hyundai Elantra N TCR	196	(Spain) Mikel Azcona

== Results ==
=== Qualifying ===
Due to the circuit being short and 30 cars entering, the Q1 qualifying session was separated into 2 groups. The top 6 drivers from each group were eligible to compete in the Q2 session.

Pos.	No.	Name	Team	Car	Group	Q1 Time	Q2 Time	Points
1	112	(Uruguay) Santiago Urrutia	Cyan Racing Lynk&Co	Lynk & Co 03 FL TCR	B	1:20.300	1:19.800	15
2	111	(Sweden) Thed Björk	Cyan Racing Lynk&Co	Lynk & Co 03 FL TCR	B	1:19.917	1:19.885	10
3	129	(Argentina) Néstor Girolami	Squadra Martino	Honda Civic Type R TCR (FL5)	A	1:20.810	1:20.118	8
4	105	(Hungary) Norbert Michelisz	BRC Hyundai N Squadra Corse	Hyundai Elantra N TCR	B	1:20.361	1:20.200	6
5	122	(Belgium) Frédéric Vervisch	Audi Sport Team Comtoyou	Audi RS 3 LMS TCR (2021)	A	1:20.875	1:20.457	4
6	179	(United Kingdom) Robert Huff	Audi Sport Team Comtoyou	Audi RS 3 LMS TCR (2021)	B	1:20.852	1:20.457	2
7	60	(Uruguay) Juan Manuel Casella	Squadra Martino	Honda Civic Type R TCR (FK8)	A	1:20.810	1:20.733	
8	196	(Spain) Mikel Azcona	BRC Hyundai N Squadra Corse	Hyundai Elantra N TCR	A	1:20.545	1:20.846	
9	168	(France) Yann Ehrlacher	Cyan Racing Lynk&Co	Lynk & Co 03 FL TCR	A	1:20.443	1:20.922	
10	155	(China) Ma Qing Hua	Cyan Racing Lynk&Co	Lynk & Co 03 FL TCR	A	1:20.871	1:21.162	
11	23	(Argentina) Ignacio Montenegro	Squadra Martino	Honda Civic Type R TCR (FK8)	B	1:21.389	1:21.209	
12	86	(Argentina) Esteban Guerrieri	Bratton Tito Bessone Team	Toyota GR Corolla Sport TCR	B	1:21.054	1:21.356	
13	2	(Argentina) Juan Ángel Rosso	Paladini Racing	Toyota GR Corolla Sport TCR	A	1:21.365	-	
14	28	(Brazil) Galid Osman	W2 ProGP	CUPRA Leon Competicion TCR	B	1:21.405	-	
15	8	(Brazil) Rafael Suzuki	PMO Motorsport	Lynk & Co 03 TCR	A	1:21.563	-	
16	77	(Brazil) Raphael Reis	W2 ProGP	CUPRA Leon Competicion TCR	A	1:21.716	-	
17	24	(Uruguay) Frederick Balbi	PMO Motorsport	Lynk & Co 03 TCR	B	1:21.834	-	
18	17	(Argentina) Bernardo Llaver	Toyota Team Argentina	Toyota GR Corolla Sport TCR	B	1:21.854	-	
19	43	(Brazil) Pedro Cardoso	Scuderia Chiarelli	Hyundai Elantra N TCR	B	1:22.004	-	
20	15	(Uruguay) Enrique Maglione	Squadra Martino	Honda Civic Type R TCR (FK8)	B	1:22.170	-	
21	5	(Argentina) Fabián Yannantuoni	Paladini Racing	Toyota GR Corolla Sport TCR	A	1:22.186	-	
22	1	(Argentina) Fabricio Pezzini	Paladini Racing	Audi RS 3 LMS TCR (2017)	B	1:22.456	-	
23	70	(Brazil) Diego Nunes	Cobra Racing Team	Toyota GR Corolla Sport TCR	A	1:22.574	-	
24	33	(Argentina) José Manuel Sapag	Toyota Team Argentina	Toyota GR Corolla Sport TCR	B	1:22.819	-	
25	34	(Brazil) Fabio Casagrande	Squadra Martino	Honda Civic Type R TCR (FK8)	B	1:23.278	-	
26	35	(Uruguay) Gonzalo Reilly	PMO Racing	Peugeot 308 TCR	B	1:23.403	-	
27	13	(Uruguay) Carlos Silva	Alfa Racing	Alfa Romeo Giulietta Veloce TCR	A	1:24.112	-	
28	10	(Brazil) Adalberto Baptista	Cobra Racing Team	Toyota GR Corolla Sport TCR	A	1:25.177	-	
29	36	(Argentina) Damián Fineschi	PMO Racing	Peugeot 308 TCR	A	No time set	-	
30	90	(Uruguay) Michell Bonnin	Alfa Racing	Alfa Romeo Giulietta Veloce TCR	A	No time set	-	

=== Race 1 ===
Santiago Urrutia managed to keep his lead after the start, with teammate Thed Björk right behind him. Fabricio Pezzini and Carlos Silva made contact at the back of the field, resulting in the latter retiring. Girolami overtook Björk in the early part of the race but later dropped behind both Björk and Frédéric Vervisch, where he would remain for the rest of the race. Raphael Reis pulled into the pit lane on lap 4 with smoke coming under the hood of his Cupra, leading to his retirement. Enrique Maglione retired on the same lap due to damage done to the front of his Honda. Yann Ehrlacher eventually caught the group and attempted to attack Michelisz for 5th place, but unsuccessfully, and both of them lost time doing so. This allowed Girolami a chance to attack Vervisch for 3rd place with no threat from behind, but the Honda driver made a mistake and compromised his chances for a podium finish. Fabián Yannantuoni came into the pit lane to retire with possible suspension damage following an accident. Björk started to close in on Urrutia but remained 2nd, allowing his teammate to take a victory on home soil. Further down the order, Esteban Guerrieri passed Juan Ángel Rosso for 12th place on the final straight, with just 0.019 seconds separating them at the finish line. Ignacio Montenegro claimed the win in TCR South America, finishing 10th overall.

Pos.	No.	Name	Team	Car	Laps	Time/retired	Grid	Points
1	112	(Uruguay) Santiago Urrutia	Cyan Racing Lynk&Co	Lynk & Co 03 FL TCR	20	27:29.487	1	30
2	111	(Sweden) Thed Björk	Cyan Racing Lynk&Co	Lynk & Co 03 FL TCR	20	+0.479	2	25
3	122	(Belgium) Frédéric Vervisch	Audi Sport Team Comtoyou	Audi RS 3 LMS TCR (2021)	20	+3.131	5	22
4	129	(Argentina) Néstor Girolami	Squadra Martino	Honda Civic Type R TCR (FL5)	20	+3.544	3	20
5	105	(Hungary) Norbert Michelisz	BRC Hyundai N Squadra Corse	Hyundai Elantra N TCR	20	+4.184	4	18
6	168	(France) Yann Ehrlacher	Cyan Racing Lynk&Co	Lynk & Co 03 FL TCR	20	+5.633	9	16
7	179	(United Kingdom) Robert Huff	Audi Sport Team Comtoyou	Audi RS 3 LMS TCR (2021)	20	+14.938	6	14
8	196	(Spain) Mikel Azcona	BRC Hyundai N Squadra Corse	Hyundai Elantra N TCR	20	+16.420	8	12
9	155	(China) Ma Qing Hua	Cyan Racing Lynk&Co	Lynk & Co 03 FL TCR	20	+20.037	10	10
10	23	(Argentina) Ignacio Montenegro	Squadra Martino	Honda Civic Type R TCR (FK8)	20	+21.409	11	8
11	60	(Uruguay) Juan Manuel Casella	Squadra Martino	Honda Civic Type R TCR (FK8)	20	+22.408	7	6
12	86	(Argentina) Esteban Guerrieri	Bratton Tito Bessone Team	Toyota GR Corolla Sport TCR	20	+23.985	12	4
13	2	(Argentina) Juan Ángel Rosso	Paladini Racing	Toyota GR Corolla Sport TCR	20	+24.004	13	3
14	17	(Argentina) Bernardo Llaver	Toyota Team Argentina	Toyota GR Corolla Sport TCR	20	+25.995	18	2
15	8	(Brazil) Rafael Suzuki	PMO Motorsport	Lynk & Co 03 TCR	20	+29.452	15	1
16	28	(Brazil) Galid Osman	W2 ProGP	CUPRA Leon Competicion TCR	20	+34.223	14	
17	24	(Uruguay) Frederick Balbi	PMO Motorsport	Lynk & Co 03 TCR	20	+35.108	16	
18	43	(Brazil) Pedro Cardoso	Scuderia Chiarelli	Hyundai Elantra N TCR	20	+41.317	20	
19	33	(Argentina) José Manuel Sapag	Toyota Team Argentina	Toyota GR Corolla Sport TCR	20	+48.163	26	
20	70	(Brazil) Diego Nunes	Cobra Racing Team	Toyota GR Corolla Sport TCR	20	+48.534	21	
21	1	(Argentina) Fabricio Pezzini	Paladini Racing	Audi RS 3 LMS TCR (2017)	20	+1:01.778	24	
22	35	(Uruguay) Gonzalo Reilly	PMO Racing	Peugeot 308 TCR	20	+1:02.672	28	
23	10	(Brazil) Adalberto Baptista	Cobra Racing Team	Toyota GR Corolla Sport TCR	19	+1 lap	25	
24	34	(Brazil) Fabio Casagrande	Squadra Martino	Honda Civic Type R TCR (FK8)	18	+2 laps	27	
25	5	(Argentina) Fabián Yannantuoni	Paladini Racing	Toyota GR Corolla Sport TCR	13	Accident damage	19	
26	15	(Uruguay) Enrique Maglione	Squadra Martino	Honda Civic Type R TCR (FK8)	4	Accident damage	22	
27	77	(Brazil) Raphael Reis	W2 ProGP	CUPRA Leon Competicion TCR	4	Mechanical	17	
28	13	(Uruguay) Carlos Silva	Alfa Racing	Alfa Romeo Giulietta Veloce TCR	1	Accident	23	
Fastest lap: Santiago Urrutia, lap time 1:20.774 / Source:

=== Race 2 ===
The top 10 from qualifying is reversed for the race 2 grid.

Ma Qing Hua kept his lead after the start. Azcona collided with Ehrlacher right after the start, claiming 2nd place. Enrique Maglione received a drive-through penalty for driving a damaged car, as seemingly it wasn't fixed after his Race 1 accident. The safety car was brought out on lap 7 due to one of the drivers knocking over a tyre barrier. The race was resumed on lap 10, with Ma Qing Hua remaining in the lead, followed by Azcona, Ehrlacher, and both Comtoyou drivers. Ignacio Montenegro retired due to a wheel coming loose on his Honda on lap 13. Michelisz, Girolami, and Björk were fighting for 6th place but made several contacts on lap 15, with Girolami and Michelisz both overtaken by Urrutia. The safety car came out right after, because Gonzalo Reilly stopped his Peugeot on the track. Ma Qing Hua made a perfect restart yet again, staying ahead of Azcona for the final two laps and claiming a victory. During an interview, he claimed the race was a highlight of his career because he became the first Chinese driver to win a world championship event driving a Chinese car.

Pos.	No.	Name	Team	Car	Laps	Time/retired	Grid	Points
1	155	(China) Ma Qing Hua	Cyan Racing Lynk&Co	Lynk & Co 03 FL TCR	21	32:14.778	1	30
2	196	(Spain) Mikel Azcona	BRC Hyundai N Squadra Corse	Hyundai Elantra N TCR	21	+0.685	3	25
3	168	(France) Yann Ehrlacher	Cyan Racing Lynk&Co	Lynk & Co 03 FL TCR	21	+2.344	2	22
4	179	(United Kingdom) Robert Huff	Audi Sport Team Comtoyou	Audi RS 3 LMS TCR (2021)	21	+3.160	5	20
5	122	(Belgium) Frédéric Vervisch	Audi Sport Team Comtoyou	Audi RS 3 LMS TCR (2021)	21	+3.587	6	18
6	112	(Uruguay) Santiago Urrutia	Cyan Racing Lynk&Co	Lynk & Co 03 FL TCR	21	+4.925	10	16
7	105	(Hungary) Norbert Michelisz	BRC Hyundai N Squadra Corse	Hyundai Elantra N TCR	21	+5.469	7	14
8	129	(Argentina) Néstor Girolami	Squadra Martino	Honda Civic Type R TCR (FL5)	21	+6.082	8	12
9	111	(Sweden) Thed Björk	Cyan Racing Lynk&Co	Lynk & Co 03 FL TCR	21	+9.304^{1}	9	10
10	86	(Argentina) Esteban Guerrieri	Bratton Tito Bessone Team	Toyota GR Corolla Sport TCR	21	+10.594	12	8
11	2	(Argentina) Juan Ángel Rosso	Paladini Racing	Toyota GR Corolla Sport TCR	21	+12.351	13	6
12	8	(Brazil) Rafael Suzuki	PMO Motorsport	Lynk & Co 03 TCR	21	+12.933	15	4
13	60	(Uruguay) Juan Manuel Casella	Squadra Martino	Honda Civic Type R TCR (FK8)	21	+13.432	4	3
14	24	(Uruguay) Frederick Balbi	PMO Motorsport	Lynk & Co 03 TCR	21	+13.721	16	2
15	77	(Brazil) Raphael Reis	W2 ProGP	CUPRA Leon Competicion TCR	21	+14.466	17	1
16	17	(Argentina) Bernardo Llaver	Toyota Team Argentina	Toyota GR Corolla Sport TCR	21	+14.694	18	
17	28	(Brazil) Galid Osman	W2 ProGP	CUPRA Leon Competicion TCR	21	+14.924	14	
18	70	(Brazil) Diego Nunes	Cobra Racing Team	Toyota GR Corolla Sport TCR	21	+15.676	20	
19	1	(Argentina) Fabricio Pezzini	Paladini Racing	Audi RS 3 LMS TCR (2017)	21	+17.043	21	
20	5	(Argentina) Fabián Yannantuoni	Paladini Racing	Toyota GR Corolla Sport TCR	21	+19.039	19	
21	33	(Argentina) José Manuel Sapag	Toyota Team Argentina	Toyota GR Corolla Sport TCR	21	+20.303	23	
22	43	(Brazil) Pedro Cardoso	Scuderia Chiarelli	Hyundai Elantra N TCR	21	+21.404	26	
23	34	(Brazil) Fabio Casagrande	Squadra Martino	Honda Civic Type R TCR (FK8)	21	+23.794	24	
24	10	(Brazil) Adalberto Baptista	Cobra Racing Team	Toyota GR Corolla Sport TCR	21	+26.131	22	
25	13	(Uruguay) Carlos Silva	Alfa Racing	Alfa Romeo Giulietta Veloce TCR	21	+27.204	27	
26	15	(Uruguay) Enrique Maglione	Squadra Martino	Honda Civic Type R TCR (FK8)	18	+3 laps	28	
27	35	(Uruguay) Gonzalo Reilly	PMO Racing	Peugeot 308 TCR	16	Retired	25	
28	23	(Argentina) Ignacio Montenegro	Squadra Martino	Honda Civic Type R TCR (FK8)	13	Lost wheel	11	
Fastest lap: Mikel Azcona, lap time 1:20.797 / Source:

- ^1 – Thed Björk received a 5-second time penalty for causing a collision with Norbert Michelisz. As a result, he dropped from 6th place to 9th.

== Standings after the round ==
Drivers' championship standings

Pos	Driver	Points	Change
1	(France) Yann Ehrlacher	235	
2	(Hungary) Norbert Michelisz	215	
3	(Spain) Mikel Azcona	205	
4	(United Kingdom) Robert Huff	197	
5	(Sweden) Thed Björk	190	1

Teams' championship standings

Pos	Driver	Points	Change
1	(Sweden) Cyan Racing Lynk & Co	546	
2	(Italy) BRC Hyundai N Squadra Corse	430	
3	(Belgium) Audi Sport Team Comtoyou	401	
4	(Estonia) ALM Motorsport	182	
5	(Belgium) Comtoyou Racing	148	
