= 2025 Fórmula 2 Argentina =

Argentine motorsport season

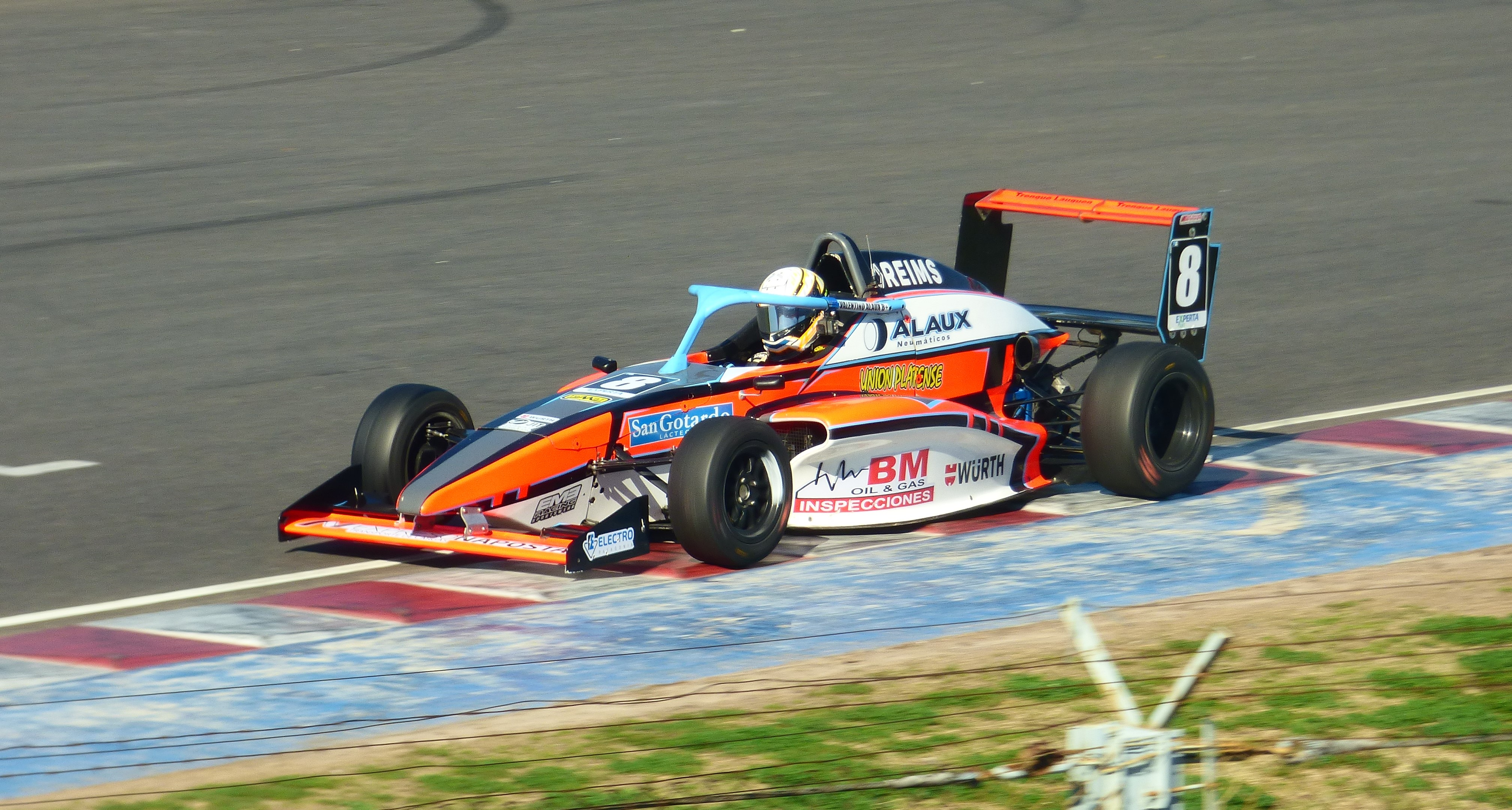
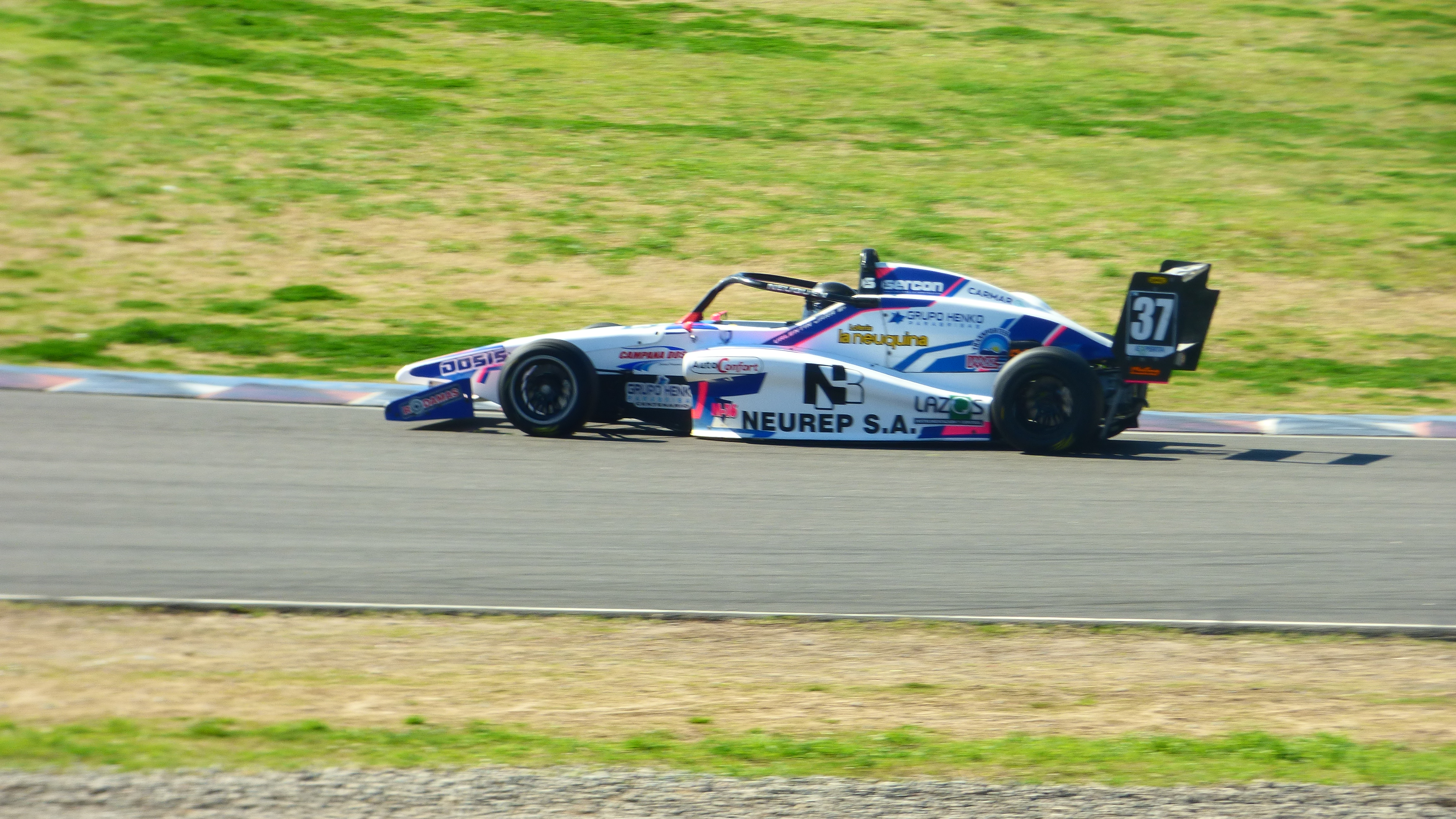
Gabriel Werner Competición's Valentino Alaux (top) won the Drivers' Championship title, while Valentín Jara (bottom) came runner-up and led his Martínez Competición team to its second Teams' Championship title.

The 2025 Fórmula 2 Argentina was the second season of Fórmula 2 Argentina, a single-seater championship created following the split of the two major Argentine motorsport governing bodies in Argentina, ACTC and ACA, in 2024. Fórmula 2 Argentina is overseen by the ACTC.

The season began at Autódromo Ciudad de Viedma on 16 February, and was held over twelve race weekends. Gabriel Werner Competición's Valentino Alaux won the Drivers' Championship at the final race of the season as Martínez Competición, the team of his closest competitor, defended its Teams' Championship title.

== Teams and drivers ==
2025 saw the introduction of an engine lottery system designed to close up competition. All teams were Argentine-registered.

Team	No.	Drivers	Status	Rounds
Martínez Competición (Note: Some drivers competed under the Martínez Competición name, while others competed as MM Competición.); MM Competición	1	(Argentina) Nicolás Suárez		3
Martínez Competición; MM Competición	29	(Argentina) Joaquín Rubino		All
Martínez Competición; MM Competición	37	(Argentina) Valentín Jara		All
Martínez Competición; MM Competición	44	(Argentina) Stefano Polini		All
Gabriel Werner Competición (Note: Some drivers competed under the Gabriel Werner Competición name, while others competed as Werner Competición Satelite and Werner JR.); Werner Competición Satelite; Werner JR	8	(Argentina) Valentino Alaux		All
Gabriel Werner Competición; Werner Competición Satelite; Werner JR	27	(Argentina) Federico Piper		All
Gabriel Werner Competición; Werner Competición Satelite; Werner JR	31	(Uruguay) Máximo Castro		2–6, 8–11
Gabriel Werner Competición; Werner Competición Satelite; Werner JR	33	(Argentina) Salvador Audisio		10–12
Gabriel Werner Competición; Werner Competición Satelite; Werner JR	36	(Argentina) Ignacio Sachs	G	12
Gabriel Werner Competición; Werner Competición Satelite; Werner JR	41	(Argentina) Andrés Brion		6
Gabriel Werner Competición; Werner Competición Satelite; Werner JR	103	(Argentina) Franco Ledesma		3–12
Aimar Motorsport (Note: Some drivers competed under the Aimar Motorsport name, while others competed under Aimar Motorsport Satelite.); Aimar Motorsport Satelite	9	(Argentina) Ignacio Monti		All
Aimar Motorsport; Aimar Motorsport Satelite	73	(Argentina) Brian Massa		1–2
Aimar Motorsport; Aimar Motorsport Satelite	103	(Argentina) Franco Ledesma		1–2
LR Team (Note: Some drivers competed under the LR Team name, while others competed under LR Team Satelite.); LR Team Satelite	26	(Argentina) Lautaro Videla		3–12
LR Team; LR Team Satelite	72	(Argentina) Ignacio Diaz		All
LR Team; LR Team Satelite	76	(Argentina) Jorge Bruno		1–9
LR Team; LR Team Satelite	118	(Argentina) Ramiro Cuenca		1–4, 6–7
DIM Motorsport	43	(Argentina) Agustín Ortega		5
Escuderia Ferreira	45	(Argentina) Ayton Chorne		6
Cepeda Racing	59	(Argentina) Cristian Galeano	G	12
Escudería Vicino	77	(Argentina) Luciano Vicino		7–9
ESG Fórmula (Note: Some drivers competed under ESG Fórmula name, while others competed under ESG Fórmula Satelite.); ESG Fórmula Satelite	87	(Argentina) Thiago Bettino		1–4
ESG Fórmula; ESG Fórmula Satelite	116	(Argentina) Simón Volpi		3–6, 8
ESG Fórmula; ESG Fórmula Satelite	117	(Argentina) Joaquín Pagola		11–12
ESG Fórmula; ESG Fórmula Satelite	120	(Argentina) Mateo Ferlindo		4

Icon	Class
G	Guest driver

== Race calendar ==
The 2025 calendar initially saw its first few rounds confirmed, before the whole calendar was announced in May 2025. The championship visited twelve locations and made its debut at Autódromo Termas de Río Hondo and Circuito San Juan Villicum. All its races supported ACTC's Turismo Carretera and TC Pista series.

Round		Circuit	Date	Map of circuit locations
1	PF	(Río Negro Province) Autódromo Ciudad de Viedma, Viedma	15 February	2025 Fórmula 2 Argentina is located in Argentina
1	F	(Río Negro Province) Autódromo Ciudad de Viedma, Viedma	16 February	2025 Fórmula 2 Argentina is located in Argentina
2	PF	(Neuquén Province) Autódromo Parque Provincia del Neuquén, Centenario	29 March	2025 Fórmula 2 Argentina is located in Argentina
2	F	(Neuquén Province) Autódromo Parque Provincia del Neuquén, Centenario	30 March	2025 Fórmula 2 Argentina is located in Argentina
3	PF	(La Pampa Province) Autódromo Provincia de La Pampa, Toay	19 April	2025 Fórmula 2 Argentina is located in Argentina
3	F	(La Pampa Province) Autódromo Provincia de La Pampa, Toay	20 April	2025 Fórmula 2 Argentina is located in Argentina
4	PF	(Santiago del Estero Province) Autódromo Termas de Río Hondo, Termas de Río Hondo	10 May	2025 Fórmula 2 Argentina is located in Argentina
4	F	(Santiago del Estero Province) Autódromo Termas de Río Hondo, Termas de Río Hondo	11 May	2025 Fórmula 2 Argentina is located in Argentina
5	PF	(Misiones Province) Autódromo Rosamonte, Posadas	21 June	2025 Fórmula 2 Argentina is located in Argentina
5	F	(Misiones Province) Autódromo Rosamonte, Posadas	22 June	2025 Fórmula 2 Argentina is located in Argentina
6	PF	(Entre Ríos Province) Autódromo de Concepción del Uruguay, Concepción del Uruguay	12 July	2025 Fórmula 2 Argentina is located in Argentina
6	F	(Entre Ríos Province) Autódromo de Concepción del Uruguay, Concepción del Uruguay	13 July	2025 Fórmula 2 Argentina is located in Argentina
7	PF	(San Juan Province, Argentina) Circuito San Juan Villicum, Albardón	9 August	2025 Fórmula 2 Argentina is located in Argentina
7	F	(San Juan Province, Argentina) Circuito San Juan Villicum, Albardón	10 August	2025 Fórmula 2 Argentina is located in Argentina
8	PF	Autódromo Oscar y Juan Gálvez, Buenos Aires	23 August	2025 Fórmula 2 Argentina is located in Argentina
8	F	Autódromo Oscar y Juan Gálvez, Buenos Aires	24 August	2025 Fórmula 2 Argentina is located in Argentina
9	PF	(San Luis Province) Autódromo Rosendo Hernández, San Luis	13 September	2025 Fórmula 2 Argentina is located in Argentina
9	F	(San Luis Province) Autódromo Rosendo Hernández, San Luis	14 September	2025 Fórmula 2 Argentina is located in Argentina
10	PF	(Buenos Aires Province) Autódromo Juan María Traverso, San Nicolás de los Arroyos	4 October	2025 Fórmula 2 Argentina is located in Argentina
10	F	(Buenos Aires Province) Autódromo Juan María Traverso, San Nicolás de los Arroyos	5 October	2025 Fórmula 2 Argentina is located in Argentina
11	PF	(Entre Ríos Province) Autódromo Ciudad de Paraná, Paraná	1 November	2025 Fórmula 2 Argentina is located in Argentina
11	F	(Entre Ríos Province) Autódromo Ciudad de Paraná, Paraná	2 November	2025 Fórmula 2 Argentina is located in Argentina
12	PF	(Buenos Aires Province) Autódromo Roberto Mouras, La Plata	6 December	2025 Fórmula 2 Argentina is located in Argentina
12	F	(Buenos Aires Province) Autódromo Roberto Mouras, La Plata	7 December	2025 Fórmula 2 Argentina is located in Argentina

== Race results ==
Round		Circuit	Pole position	Fastest lap	Winning driver	Winning team
1	PF	(Río Negro Province) Autódromo Ciudad de Viedma	(Argentina) Valentín Jara	(Argentina) Valentín Jara	(Argentina) Valentín Jara	Martínez Competición
1	F	(Río Negro Province) Autódromo Ciudad de Viedma		(Argentina) Valentín Jara	(Argentina) Valentín Jara	Martínez Competición
2	PF	(Neuquén Province) Autódromo Parque Provincia del Neuquén	(Argentina) Ignacio Monti	(Argentina) Valentino Alaux	(Argentina) Valentino Alaux	Gabriel Werner Competición
2	F	(Neuquén Province) Autódromo Parque Provincia del Neuquén		(Argentina) Ignacio Diaz	(Argentina) Ignacio Diaz	LR Team
3	PF	(La Pampa Province) Autódromo Provincia de La Pampa	(Argentina) Valentín Jara	(Argentina) Federico Piper	(Argentina) Valentín Jara	Martínez Competición
3	F	(La Pampa Province) Autódromo Provincia de La Pampa		(Argentina) Stefano Polini	(Argentina) Stefano Polini	Martínez Competición
4	PF	(Santiago del Estero Province) Autódromo Termas de Río Hondo	(Argentina) Valentín Jara	(Argentina) Ignacio Diaz	(Argentina) Valentín Jara	Martínez Competición
4	F	(Santiago del Estero Province) Autódromo Termas de Río Hondo		(Argentina) Valentín Jara	(Argentina) Valentín Jara	Martínez Competición
5	PF	(Misiones Province) Autódromo Rosamonte	(Argentina) Ignacio Diaz	(Argentina) Ignacio Monti	(Argentina) Ignacio Diaz	LR Team
5	F	(Misiones Province) Autódromo Rosamonte		(Argentina) Ignacio Diaz	(Argentina) Ignacio Diaz	LR Team
6	PF	(Entre Ríos Province) Autódromo de Concepción del Uruguay	(Uruguay) Máximo Castro	(Argentina) Stefano Polini	(Argentina) Stefano Polini	Martínez Competición
6	F	(Entre Ríos Province) Autódromo de Concepción del Uruguay		(Argentina) Stefano Polini	(Argentina) Jorge Bruno	LR Team
7	PF	(San Juan Province, Argentina) Circuito San Juan Villicum	(Argentina) Franco Ledesma	(Argentina) Franco Ledesma	(Argentina) Franco Ledesma	Aimar Motorsport
7	F	(San Juan Province, Argentina) Circuito San Juan Villicum		(Argentina) Stefano Polini	(Argentina) Stefano Polini	Martínez Competición
8	PF	(Buenos Aires) Autódromo Oscar y Juan Gálvez	(Argentina) Ignacio Diaz	(Argentina) Ignacio Monti	(Argentina) Valentino Alaux	Gabriel Werner Competición
8	F	(Buenos Aires) Autódromo Oscar y Juan Gálvez		(Argentina) Valentín Jara	(Argentina) Ignacio Diaz	LR Team
9	PF	(San Luis Province) Autódromo Rosendo Hernández	(Argentina) Franco Ledesma	(Argentina) Ignacio Monti	(Argentina) Valentino Alaux	Gabriel Werner Competición
9	F	(San Luis Province) Autódromo Rosendo Hernández		(Argentina) Ignacio Monti	(Argentina) Ignacio Monti	Aimar Motorsport
10	PF	(Buenos Aires Province) Autódromo Juan María Traverso	(Argentina) Valentín Jara	(Argentina) Valentín Jara	(Argentina) Valentín Jara	Martínez Competición
10	F	(Buenos Aires Province) Autódromo Juan María Traverso		(Argentina) Valentín Jara	(Argentina) Valentín Jara	Martínez Competición
11	PF	(Entre Ríos Province) Autódromo Ciudad de Paraná	(Argentina) Valentino Alaux	(Argentina) Valentino Alaux	(Argentina) Ignacio Diaz	LR Team
11	F	(Entre Ríos Province) Autódromo Ciudad de Paraná		(Argentina) Valentino Alaux	(Argentina) Ignacio Diaz	LR Team
12	PF	(Buenos Aires Province) Autódromo Roberto Mouras	(Argentina) Valentino Alaux	(Argentina) Valentino Alaux	(Argentina) Valentino Alaux	Gabriel Werner Competición
12	F	(Buenos Aires Province) Autódromo Roberto Mouras		(Argentina) Valentino Alaux	(Argentina) Valentino Alaux	Gabriel Werner Competición

== Season report ==
=== First half ===
The 2025 Fórmula 2 Argentina season began in February at Autódromo Ciudad de Viedma with Martínez Competición's Valentín Jara dominating both qualifying and the pre-final, claiming a new track record upon setting pole position and leading series debutants and teammates Stefano Polini and Joaquín Rubino lights-to-flag in the opening race. Jara doubled down in the final on Sunday, claiming a second unchallenged victory to end the weekend with a substantial championship lead. Polini and Rubino once again made up the rest of the podium to give Martínez Competición a second podium lockout in as many races.

The Autódromo Parque Provincia del Neuquén hosted round two, where Aimar Motorsport's Ignacio Monti claimed pole position for the pre-final. However, it was Gabriel Werner Competición's Valentino Alaux who starred in the first race, taking the lead by turn two and claiming the victory. Monti dropped to fourth, behind Ignacio Diaz of LR Team and Federico Piper of Gabriel Werner as points leader Jara was unable to start the race. The second race saw a three-way battle for the lead between Alaux, Piper and Diaz, with the latter eventually coming out on top to take the victory. Jara bounced back to claim second place, while third went to LR Team's Jorge Bruno.

Round three was held at Autódromo Provincia de La Pampa. Jara led the field in qualifying to take pole position, before repeating the feat in the pre-final. He converted his grid position into a lights-to-flag victory ahead of Piper and Alaux, bolstering his championship lead in the process. That handed him pole position for the final on Sunday. He kept Piper in check behind him and looked set to win, until Piper attacked. That brought other cars behind closer to the battle, and Polini pounced to take a lead he would not give up. He took his maiden win in the series ahead of Bruno and Alaux, with Jara relegated to fourth and Piper unable to finish the race in the end.

Teams and drivers traveled north to the Autódromo Termas de Río Hondo for round four, and Jara was once the man with the best single-lap pace as he took another pole position in qualifying. The pre-final was closely contested between polesitter Jara, Diaz and ESG Fórmula's Simón Volpi, but Jara held on to take victory. He doubled down on his efforts in the final on Sunday, taking another win and further growing his championship lead over the chasing field. Volpi climbed one spot in the race to take second place and leave his second weekend of the championship with two podiums, while Diaz claimed third place to move into second place in the championship standings.

Round five at Autódromo Rosamonte was next, where Diaz became the season's third different polesitter. Alaux started the pre-final alongside him, and the pair finished the race in the same order. Monti took third place as points leader Jara was off the pace in ninth, allowing Diaz to shorten his points lead. The top three from the pre-final also became the top three in the final, with Diaz claiming back-to-back victories in a dominant display for his LR Team. Jara managed fourth in the second race, reducing the damage to his points lead, but Diaz and Alaux still closed up to him in the standings.

The Autódromo de Concepción del Uruguay brought an end to the first half of the season. Gabriel Werner Competición's Maximo Castro was fastest in qualifying to start the pre-final from pole position. He was unable to convert his maiden pole position into a victory, however, having to cede the lead to Polini. Castro finished second, ahead of LR Team's Lautaro Videla. The final then saw a brilliant display for Bruno, who started ninth and made his way up the order past the leading group to take his maiden win in the series. Piper had a similar rise from eighth to second, while Castro took third. An anonymous weekend for Diaz saw Alaux take second in the standings with two fourth-place finishes.

=== Second half ===
Round seven saw the series debut at Circuito San Juan Villicum. Aimar Motorsport's Franco Ledesma took his maiden pole position in qualifying ahead of Polini and Monti. He led every lap of the pre-final to convert his pole position into his maiden victory, with Polini and Monti also finishing on the podium where they had qualified. Ledesma looked set to sweep the weekend in the final race as he led from pole position once more. However, engine issues caused him to slow down in the final stages of the race. He dropped behind Polini, who took the win and with it rose to second in the standings. Jara took third to extend his championship lead over the field once again.

Round eight saw the drivers compete around the Autódromo Oscar y Juan Gálvez, and Diaz led Jara and Alaux to claim pole position in qualifying. However, Alaux was the fastest man in the pre-final as he moved past both of them to clinch the victory and take second in the standings. Jara dropped down to finish eleventh as Videla completed the podium. Diaz bounced back to win the final race, with Alaux having to settle for second place this time and Monti back on the podium in third. Jara was able to recover to fifth after his pointless finish in the pre-final, but both Alaux and Diaz still closed up to him significantly in the championship standings.

Up next was the Autódromo Rosendo Hernández for round nine of the season. Ledesma returned to pole position in qualifying, leading title challengers Jara and Alaux. He failed to convert his pole position into a victory, however, as he finished second behind Alaux. Third went to Piper, while Jara only managed sixth. The final race saw a remarkable victory for Monti, who started in eleventh place and moved up through the field during the race. Diaz was second on the road, but a post-race disqualification saw Ledesma inherit the place, with Rubino moving up to third. Alaux took fourth place, while Jara retired, which saw him lose the championship lead he had held since the first race to Alaux.

The Autódromo Juan María Traverso was the venue for round ten. Jara, fresh off losing his long-time championship lead, set the fastest time in qualifying to take pole position. He followed up his qualifying success with a victory in the pre-final, where he led Ledesma and Rubino, who returned to the podium for the first time since the opening round. That saw him completely close the gap to Alaux in the standings as the latter only finished sixth. Jara then doubled up in the final race, taking another win, with Ledesma second again and Polini in third this time. That allowed Jara to quickly reclaim his championship lead as Alaux finished outside the top four places once again, in fifth this time.

Alaux bounced back by taking his maiden pole position for the penultimate pre-final at Autódromo Ciudad de Paraná. He failed to convert it, however, as he faded to ninth in the race, which was won by Diaz ahead of Ledesma and Videla. Jara finished fifth, collecting valuable points ahead of Alaux. The final race shook up the championship picture when Jara was forced to retire after a collision. That, coupled with a great race for Alaux that saw him rise from ninth on the grid into second place behind lights-to-flag winner Diaz, saw Alaux reclaim the championship lead ahead of the final round. Polini completed the podium in third.

The Autódromo Roberto Mouras hosted the season final. With 50% more points on offer, Alaux got to work right away by claiming pole position for the pre-final. He led every lap of the penultimate race of the season to win ahead of Cepeda Racing's guest driver Cristian Galeano and Monti, with Jara coming fourth to keep the fight open heading into the final race of the year. But Jara would only finish tenth in the final race, handing Alaux every chance to wrap up the title, which he did in style by taking another unchallenged race win. This time he took victory ahead of Polini as Monti claimed another third place.

Jara won the most races, taking home seven race wins to Alaux' five, and took four pole positions while Alaux only managed two. He led the championship from the very first race up until race eighteen of the year. Still, Alaux was the one who won the title in the end, and did so by utilizing his superior consistency. Alaux was the only driver in the field to finish every race of the season, only ending one race outside the top ten, while Jara recorded three retirements, one non-points finish and failed to start one race. That allowed Alaux to close up to Jara throughout the middle part of the season, before he claimed the championship lead and wrapped up his championship with a double win at the final.

== Championship standings ==
=== Scoring system ===
Points were given to top 10 in the first race, called the Pre-final, and to the top 15 in the second race, called the Final.

Pre-final
Position	**1st**	**2nd**	**3rd**	**4th**	**5th**	**6th**	**7th**	**8th**	**9th**	**10th**	**Pole**
Points	15	12	10	8	6	5	4	3	2	1	3

Final
Position	**1st**	**2nd**	**3rd**	**4th**	**5th**	**6th**	**7th**	**8th**	**9th**	**10th**	**11th**	**12th**	**13th**	**14th**	**15th**
Points	25	20	17	15	13	11	9	8	7	6	5	4	3	2	1

In every round, every driver who competed in at least one training session was awarded five points.

The first and the final round of the season awarded 50% more points.

=== Drivers' championship ===
Pos.	Driver	(Río Negro Province) VIE		(Neuquén Province) NEU		(La Pampa Province) TOA		(Santiago del Estero Province) TER		(Misiones Province) POS		(Entre Ríos Province) CON		(San Juan Province, Argentina) VIL		(Buenos Aires) BUA		(San Luis Province) SLU		(Buenos Aires Province) SNI		(Entre Ríos Province) PAR		(Buenos Aires Province) LAP		Points
Pos.	Driver	PF	F	PF	F	PF	F	PF	F	PF	F	PF	F	PF	F	PF	F	PF	F	PF	F	PF	F	PF	F	Points
1	(Argentina) Valentino Alaux	6	5	1	6	3	3	10	7	2	2	4	4	11†	4	1	2	1	4	6	5	**9**	2	**1**	1	416.5
2	(Argentina) Valentín Jara	**1**	1	DNS	2	**1**	4	**1**	1	9	4	5	Ret	4	3	11	5	6	Ret	**1**	1	5	Ret	4	10	364.5
3	(Argentina) Ignacio Diaz	7	6	2	1	9	8	2	3	**1**	1	11	10†	5	Ret	**2**	1	7	DSQ	10	6	1	1	9	5	346
4	(Argentina) Stefano Polini	2	2	10	Ret	4	1	9	6	12	9	1	7	2	1	WD	WD	10	8	5	3	4	3	5	2	337
5	(Argentina) Ignacio Monti	Ret	7	**4**	Ret	5	DNS	7	8	3	3	7	5	3	5	4	3	11	1	Ret	Ret	Ret	7	3	3	299.5
6	(Argentina) Franco Ledesma	5	Ret	6	Ret	12	DNS	NC	11	4	Ret	Ret	6	**1**	2	10	Ret	**2**	2	2	2	2	8	7	6	253
7	(Argentina) Lautaro Videla					10	6	4	14	5	6	3	Ret	6	11†	3	4	5	7	4	4	3	5	6	4	244
8	(Argentina) Federico Piper	Ret	9	3	4	2	Ret	12	15	10	10	8	2	7	10	6	7	3	5	7	8	6	Ret	10	9	241
9	(Argentina) Joaquín Rubino	3	3	Ret	Ret	Ret	5	6	9	11	7	Ret	Ret	Ret	7	7	9	8	6	3	7	7	4	11	7	236.5
10	(Argentina) Jorge Bruno	8	8	5	3	6	2	5	5	Ret	11†	6	1	8	6	9	11	9	9†							210
11	(Uruguay) Máximo Castro			8	7	8	DNS	11	10	8	8	**2**	3			8	6	4	3	8	10	11	10			181
12	(Argentina) Ramiro Cuenca	Ret	10	9	5	13	9	13	13			12	9	10	8											87
13	(Argentina) Simón Volpi					11	DNS	3	2	7	Ret	10	Ret			5	8									78
14	(Argentina) Thiago Bettino	Ret	EX	7	8	14†	7	8	4																	67
15	(Argentina) Salvador Audisio																			9	9	8	6	8	12†	56
16	(Argentina) Brian Massa	4	4	DNS	DNS																					40
17	(Argentina) Luciano Vicino													9	9	12	10	12	10†							37
18	(Argentina) Agustín Ortega									6	5															26
19	(Argentina) Andrés Brion											9	8													17
20	(Argentina) Joaquín Pagola																					10	9	Ret	Ret	17
21	(Argentina) Nicolás Suárez					7	Ret																			9
22	(Argentina) Mateo Ferlindo							14†	12																	9
23	(Argentina) Ayton Chorne											Ret	Ret													5
guest drivers ineligible to score points
—	(Argentina) Cristian Galeano																							2	8	0
—	(Argentina) Ignacio Sachs																							12	11	0
Pos.	Driver	PF	F	PF	F	PF	F	PF	F	PF	F	PF	F	PF	F	PF	F	PF	F	PF	F	PF	F	PF	F	Points
Pos.	Driver	(Río Negro Province) VIE		(Neuquén Province) NEU		(La Pampa Province) TOA		(Santiago del Estero Province) TER		(Misiones Province) POS		(Entre Ríos Province) CON		(San Juan Province, Argentina) VIL		(Buenos Aires) BUA		(San Luis Province) SLU		(Buenos Aires Province) SNI		(Entre Ríos Province) PAR		(Buenos Aires Province) LAP		Points

Colour	Result
Gold	Winner
Silver	Second place
Bronze	Third place
Green	Points classification
Blue	Non-points classification
Blue	Non-classified finish (NC)
Purple	Retired, not classified (Ret)
Red	Did not qualify (DNQ)
Red	Did not pre-qualify (DNPQ)
Black	Disqualified (DSQ)
White	Did not start (DNS)
White	Withdrew (WD)
White	Race cancelled (C)
Blank	Did not practice (DNP)
Blank	Did not arrive (DNA)
Blank	Excluded (EX)

**Bold** – Pole

Italics – Fastest Lap

† – Did not finish, but classified

=== Teams' championship ===
Pos.	Team	Points
1	Martínez Competición	558
2	Gabriel Werner Competición	521
3	LR Team	454
4	Werner Competición Satelite	347
5	Aimar Motorsport	261
6	LR Team Satelite	236
7	MM Competición	162
8	ESG Fórmula	148
9	DIM Motorsport	38
10	Werner JR	32
11	Aimar Motorsport Satelite	22
12	ESG Fórmula Satelite	9
13	Escuderia Ferreira	5
