= 2021 TCR South America Touring Car Championship =

Motor racing competition

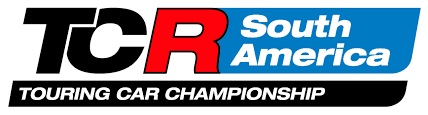
Official Logo

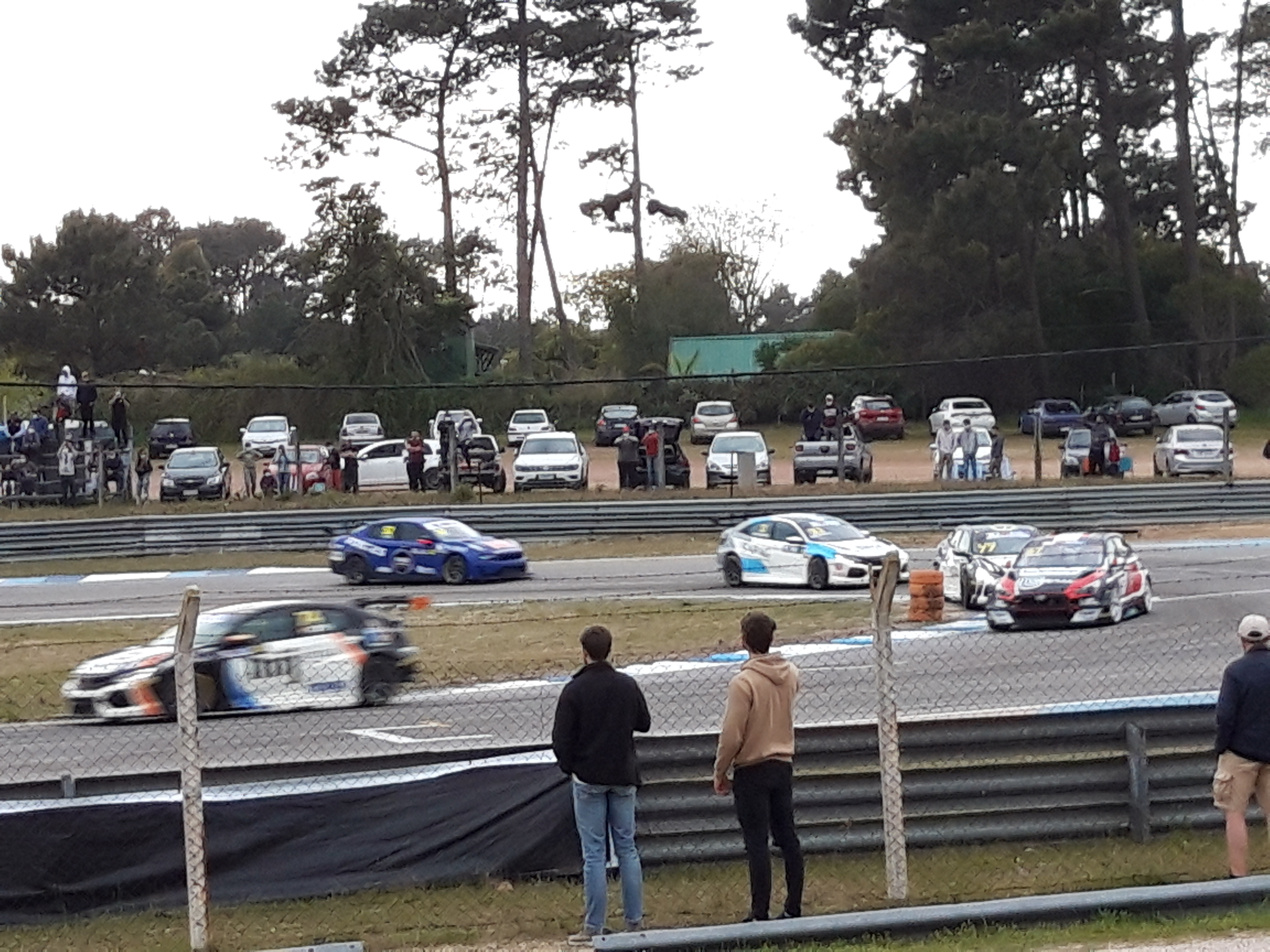
El Pinar race

The 2021 TCR South America Touring Car Championship was the first season of TCR South America Touring Car Championship.

== Calendar ==
The championship is to begin in May 2021, with a maximum of 40 entries, eight rounds consisting of sixteen 35-minute races would be run in Argentina, Brazil and Uruguay.

Race is an Endurance Event

Rnd.	Circuit/Location	Date
1	(Brazil) Autódromo José Carlos Pace, São Paulo	25–27 June
2	(Brazil) Autódromo Internacional de Curitiba, Pinhais	24–25 July
3	(Uruguay) Autódromo Eduardo Prudêncio Cabrera, Rivera	11–12 September
4	(Uruguay) Autódromo Víctor Borrat Fabini, El Pinar	2–3 October
5	(Argentina) Autódromo Parque Ciudad de Río Cuarto, Río Cuarto	30–31 October
6	(Argentina) Autódromo Oscar y Juan Gálvez, Buenos Aires	12–13 November
7	(Argentina) Autódromo Oscar Cabalén, Alta Gracia	4–5 December
8	(Argentina) Autódromo de Concepción del Uruguay, Entre Ríos Province	18–19 December

== Teams and drivers ==
It was announced on 1 August 2020, that 35 entry applications had been made for the 2021 season, and that the entry list would be published in late August. The entry applications included drivers from countries such as Argentina, Chile, Uruguay, Brazil, Paraguay, Peru and Mexico with six car marques on the entry applications.

Team	Car	No.	Drivers	Class	Rounds	Ref.	Co-Driver name	Rounds	Ref.
(Brazil) Cobra Racing Team	Audi RS 3 LMS TCR	10	(Brazil) Adalberto Baptista	T	All		(Brazil) Alan Hellmeister	2	
(Brazil) Cobra Racing Team	Audi RS 3 LMS TCR	10	(Brazil) Adalberto Baptista	T	All		(Brazil) Nono Figueiredo	6	
(Brazil) Cobra Racing Team	Audi RS 3 LMS TCR	13	(Brazil) Rodrigo Baptista		All		(Netherlands) Tom Coronel	2, 6	
(United States) KMW Motorsports with PropCar	Alfa Romeo Giulietta TCR	11	(United States) Paul Holton		1		—N/a		
(United States) KMW Motorsports with PropCar	Alfa Romeo Giulietta TCR	16	(Brazil) Fabio Casagrande	T	1–3		(Canada) James Vance	2	
(United States) KMW Motorsports with PropCar	Alfa Romeo Giulietta TCR	17	(Argentina) Roy Block	T	2, 5		(United States) Tim Lewis Jr.	2	
(United States) KMW Motorsports with PropCar	Alfa Romeo Giulietta TCR	25	(Argentina) Ayrton Chorne		4		—N/a		
(United States) KMW Motorsports with PropCar	Alfa Romeo Giulietta TCR	38	(Uruguay) Diego Martinez	T	4		—N/a		
(United States) KMW Motorsports with PropCar	Alfa Romeo Giulietta TCR	70	(Argentina) Matías Cravero		5–6		(Argentina) Juan Pablo Bessone	6	
(United States) KMW Motorsports with PropCar	Alfa Romeo Giulietta TCR	95	(Argentina) Javier Manta	T	6–7		(Argentina) Gonzalo Fernández	6	
(United States) KMW Motorsports with PropCar	Alfa Romeo Giulietta TCR	111	(Uruguay) Fabricio Larratea		3		—N/a		
(United States) KMW Motorsports with PropCar	Alfa Romeo Giulietta TCR	177	(Brazil) Valdeno Brito		7		—N/a		
(Brazil) MC Tubarão	Audi RS 3 LMS TCR	12	(Brazil) Marcio Basso (Note: Marcio Basso was entered for the Round 1 but withdrew after taking part in extra practice. He was replaced by Geciel de Andrade.)	T	1		—N/a		
(Brazil) MC Tubarão	Audi RS 3 LMS TCR	37	(Brazil) Guilherme Reischl	T	1		—N/a		
(Brazil) MC Tubarão	Audi RS 3 LMS TCR	55	(Brazil) Geciel de Andrade	T	1–2		(Brazil) Ruslan Carta Filho	2	
(Brazil) Scuderia Chiarelli	Hyundai Elantra N TCR	12	(Brazil) Sérgio Jimenez		2		(Brazil) Beto Monteiro	2	
(Brazil) Scuderia Chiarelli	Hyundai Elantra N TCR	15	(Uruguay) Enrique Maglione	T	3		—N/a		
(Brazil) Scuderia Chiarelli	Hyundai Elantra N TCR	18	(Brazil) Thiago Marques	T	2		(Brazil) Giovani Girotto	2	
(Brazil) Scuderia Chiarelli	Hyundai Elantra N TCR	27	(Uruguay) Rodrigo Aramendia		3		—N/a		
(Brazil) Scuderia Chiarelli	Hyundai Elantra N TCR	35	(Brazil) Pedro Aizza		6		(Argentina) Damián Fineschi	6	
(Brazil) Scuderia Chiarelli	Hyundai Elantra N TCR	53	(Argentina) Eugenio Provens		6		(Argentina) Nicolás Palau	6	
(Argentina) Squadra Martino	Honda Civic Type R TCR (FK2)	16	(Brazil) Fabio Casagrande	T	4–8		(Argentina) Facundo Márques	6	
(Argentina) Squadra Martino	Honda Civic Type R TCR (FK2)	25	(Argentina) Ayrton Chorne		3		—N/a		
(Argentina) Squadra Martino	Honda Civic Type R TCR (FK2)	60	(Uruguay) Juan Manuel Casella		4		—N/a		
(Argentina) Squadra Martino	Honda Civic Type R TCR (FK8)	22	(Argentina) Juan Ángel Rosso		6		(Argentina) Matías Milla	6	
(Argentina) Squadra Martino	Honda Civic Type R TCR (FK8)	25	(Argentina) Ayrton Chorne		1–2		(Brazil) Pedro Aizza	2	
(Argentina) Squadra Martino	Honda Civic Type R TCR (FK8)	33	(Argentina) José Manuel Sapag		1–2, 4–7		(Argentina) Esteban Guerrieri	2, 6	
(Argentina) Squadra Martino	Honda Civic Type R TCR (FK8)	52	(Uruguay) Cyro Fontes		3		—N/a		
(Argentina) Squadra Martino	Honda Civic Type R TCR (FK8)	70	(Argentina) Matías Cravero		7		—N/a		
(Argentina) Squadra Martino	Honda Civic Type R TCR (FK8)	88	(Argentina) Facundo Márques		5		—N/a		
(Argentina) Squadra Martino	Honda Civic Type R TCR (FK8)	133	(Argentina) Juan Pablo Bessone		8		—N/a		
(Argentina) Squadra Martino	Honda Civic Type R TCR (FK8)	155	(Uruguay) Gonzalo Reilly		3–4		—N/a		
(Argentina) Squadra Martino	Honda Civic Type R TCR (FK8)	170	(Argentina) Dorian Mansilla		8		—N/a		
(Argentina) / PMO Motorsport (Note: Lynk & Co cars entered as PMO Motorsport and Peugeot cars entered as PMO Racing.); (Argentina) / PMO Racing	Lynk & Co 03 TCR	30	(Argentina) Pablo Otero	T	3–4		—N/a		
(Argentina) / PMO Motorsport; (Argentina) / PMO Racing	Lynk & Co 03 TCR	44	(Argentina) Ernesto Bessone	T	5–6		(Argentina) Fabricio Pezzini	6	
(Argentina) / PMO Motorsport; (Argentina) / PMO Racing	Lynk & Co 03 TCR	52	(Uruguay) Cyro Fontes		4		—N/a		
(Argentina) / PMO Motorsport; (Argentina) / PMO Racing	Lynk & Co 03 TCR	81	(Argentina) Claudio Rama	T	6		(Argentina) Leandro Rama	6	
(Argentina) / PMO Motorsport; (Argentina) / PMO Racing	Lynk & Co 03 TCR	96	(Uruguay) Santiago Urrutia		3, 7		—N/a		
(Argentina) / PMO Motorsport; (Argentina) / PMO Racing	Lynk & Co 03 TCR	113	(Argentina) Fabricio Pezzini		7–8		—N/a		
(Argentina) / PMO Motorsport; (Argentina) / PMO Racing	Lynk & Co 03 TCR	114	(Argentina) Ever Franetovich		5		—N/a		
(Argentina) / PMO Motorsport; (Argentina) / PMO Racing	Peugeot 308 TCR	44	(Argentina) Ernesto Bessone	T	7–8		—N/a		
(Peru) Perú Racing Team	Hyundai i30 N TCR	47	(Peru) Rodrigo Pflucker		3–5		—N/a		
(Brazil) W2 ProGP	Honda Civic Type R TCR (FK8)	74	(Spain) Pepe Oriola		All		(Brazil) Marcelo Costa	2	
(Brazil) W2 ProGP	Honda Civic Type R TCR (FK8)	74	(Spain) Pepe Oriola		All		(Slovakia) Martin Ryba	6	
(Brazil) W2 ProGP	Honda Civic Type R TCR (FK8)	77	(Brazil) Raphael Reis		All		(Brazil) Valdeno Brito	2	
(Brazil) W2 ProGP	Honda Civic Type R TCR (FK8)	77	(Brazil) Raphael Reis		All		(Argentina) Néstor Girolami	6	

Icon	Class
T	Trophy

== Results and standings ==
=== Season summary ===
Rnd.		Circuit	Pole position	Fastest lap	Winning driver	Winning team	Winning Trophy driver
1	R1	(Brazil) Interlagos	(Brazil) Raphael Reis	(Spain) Pepe Oriola	(Spain) Pepe Oriola	(Brazil) W2 ProGP	(Brazil) Adalberto Baptista
1	R2	(Brazil) Interlagos		(Spain) Pepe Oriola	(Spain) Pepe Oriola	(Brazil) W2 ProGP	(Brazil) Adalberto Baptista
2	R3	(Brazil) Curitiba	(Argentina) José Manuel Sapag (Argentina) Esteban Guerrieri	(Brazil) Rodrigo Baptista	(Brazil) Rodrigo Baptista (Netherlands) Tom Coronel	(Brazil) Cobra Racing	(Brazil) Fábio Casagrande
3	R4	(Uruguay) Rivera	(Uruguay) Santiago Urrutia	(Spain) Pepe Oriola	(Uruguay) Santiago Urrutia	(Argentina) PMO Motorsport	(Argentina) Pablo Otero
3	R5	(Uruguay) Rivera		(Spain) Pepe Oriola	(Spain) Pepe Oriola	(Brazil) W2 ProGP	(Argentina) Pablo Otero
4	R6	(Uruguay) El Pinar	(Brazil) Rodrigo Baptista	(Brazil) Rodrigo Baptista	(Brazil) Rodrigo Baptista	(Brazil) Cobra Racing	(Uruguay) Diego Martinez
4	R7	(Uruguay) El Pinar		(Brazil) Rodrigo Baptista	(Brazil) Rodrigo Baptista	(Brazil) Cobra Racing	(Argentina) Pablo Otero
5	R8	(Argentina) Río Cuarto	(Argentina) Ever Franetovich	(Spain) Pepe Oriola	(Argentina) Ever Franetovich	(Argentina) PMO Motorsport	(Argentina) Ernesto Bessone
5	R9	(Argentina) Río Cuarto		(Peru) Rodrigo Pflucker	(Peru) Rodrigo Pflucker	(Peru) Perú Racing Team	(Argentina) Ernesto Bessone
6	R10	(Argentina) Buenos Aires	(Argentina) Juan Ángel Rosso (Argentina) Matías Milla	(Brazil) Raphael Reis	(Brazil) Raphael Reis (Argentina) Néstor Girolami	(Brazil) W2 ProGP	(Argentina) Ernesto Bessone
7	R11	(Argentina) Alta Gracia		(Brazil) Rodrigo Baptista	(Uruguay) Santiago Urrutia	(Argentina) PMO Motorsport	(Brazil) Adalberto Baptista
7	R12	(Argentina) Alta Gracia	(Argentina) Fabricio Pezzini	(Uruguay) Santiago Urrutia	(Argentina) Fabricio Pezzini	(Argentina) PMO Motorsport	(Argentina) Javier Manta
8	R13	(Argentina) Concepción del Uruguay	(Brazil) Rodrigo Baptista	(Spain) Pepe Oriola	(Spain) Pepe Oriola	(Brazil) W2 ProGP	(Argentina) Ernesto Bessone
8	R14	(Argentina) Concepción del Uruguay		(Brazil) Raphael Reis	(Argentina) Fabricio Pezzini	(Argentina) PMO Motorsport	(Brazil) Fábio Casagrande

=== Scoring system ===
Position	1st	2nd	3rd	4th	5th	6th	7th	8th	9th	10th	11th	12th	13th	14th	15th
Qualifying	5	4	3	2	1	—N/a									
Sprint races	25	20	16	13	11	10	9	8	7	6	5	4	3	2	1
Endurance races	50	40	32	26	22	20	18	16	14	12	10	8	6	4	2

=== Drivers' championship ===
Pos.	Driver	INT (Brazil)		CUR (Brazil)	RIV (Uruguay)		ELP (Uruguay)		RCU (Argentina)		BUE (Argentina)	AGR (Argentina)		CDU (Argentina)		Pts.
Pos.	Driver	RD1	RD2	RD1	RD2	RDU	RD1	RD2	RD1	RD2	RDU	RD1	RD2	RD1	RD2	Pts.
1	(Spain) Pepe Oriola	1^{2}	1	6^{5}	2^{2}	1	2^{4}	Ret	3	4	5^{5}	2	5	1^{2}	2	278
2	(Brazil) Rodrigo Baptista	3^{4}	Ret	1	5	2	1^{1}	1	8	DSQ	4^{4}	5	4^{5}	3^{1}	5	247
3	(Brazil) Raphael Reis	2^{1}	DSQ	4^{3}	4	9	4^{3}	5	5	5	1^{3}	6	3	2^{3}	8†	236
4	(Argentina) José Manuel Sapag	5^{3}	5	Ret^{1}			3^{5}	3	4^{5}	Ret	3^{2}	3	7			138
5	(Brazil) Adalberto Baptista	7	4	7†	8	7	8	7	10	6	12	9	9	6	9	130
6	(Brazil) Fabio Casagrande	9†	Ret	3	9	8	WD	WD	9	7	10	9	10	5	6	116
7	(Argentina) Fabricio Pezzini										6	4	1^{1}	DNS^{4}	1	90
8	(Uruguay) Santiago Urrutia				1^{1}	10†						1	2^{2}			85
9	(Netherlands) Tom Coronel			1							4^{4}					78
10	(Peru) Rodrigo Pflucker				WD	WD	7^{2}	4	2^{2}	1						75
11	(Argentina) Ernesto Bessone								7^{3}	3	6	DNS	DNS^{4}	4	7	72
12	(Argentina) Ayrton Chorne	6	3	5	7^{5}	DNS	DNS	DNS								60
13	(Argentina) Pablo Otero				3	4	9	2								56
14	(Argentina) Néstor Girolami										1^{3}					53
15	(Argentina) Ever Franetovich								1^{1}	2						50
16	(Argentina) Juan Ángel Rosso										2^{1}					45
16	(Argentina) Matías Milla										2^{1}					45
17	(Brazil) Sérgio Jimenez			2^{2}												44
17	(Brazil) Beto Monteiro			2^{2}												44
18	(Brazil) Pedro Aizza			5^{4}							7					42
19	(Argentina) Esteban Guerrieri			Ret^{1}							3^{2}					41
20	(United States) Paul Holton	4^{5}	2													34
21	(Brazil) Valdeno Brito			4^{3}								Ret	11†			34
22	(Canada) James Vance			3												32
23	(Argentina) Facundo Marques								6^{4}	8	10					32
24	(Uruguay) Fabricio Larratea				6	3										26
25	(Argentina) Dorian Mansilla													7^{5}	3	26
26	(Slovakia) Martin Ryba										5^{5}					23
27	(Uruguay) Diego Martínez						5	6								21
28	(Brazil) Marcelo Costa			6^{5}												21
29	(Uruguay) Rodrigo Aramendía				11^{3}	5										19
30	(Argentina) Matías Cravero								Ret	Ret	Ret	7	6			19
31	(Brazil) Guilherme Reischl	8	6													18
32	(Brazil) Alan Hellmeister			7†												18
33	(Argentina) Damián Fineschi										7					18
34	(Uruguay) Gonzalo Reilly				12†	DNS	10†	8								18
35	(Argentina) Javier Manta										11	Ret	8			18
36	(Uruguay) Enrique Maglione				10	6										16
37	(Argentina) Eugenio Provens										8					16
37	(Argentina) Nicolás Palau										8					16
38	(Argentina) Claudio Rama										9					14
38	(Argentina) Leandro Rama										9					16
39	(Argentina) Juan Pablo Bessone										Ret			Ret	4	13
40	(Uruguay) Cyro Fontes				Ret^{4}	DNS	6	Ret								12
41	(Argentina) Roy Block			Ret					11	9						12
42	(Argentina) Gonzalo Fernández										11					10
43	(Brazil) Nonô Figueiredo										12					8
-	(Brazil) Geciel de Andrade	Ret	Ret	Ret												0
-	(United States) Tim Lewis Jr.			Ret												0
-	(Brazil) Thiago Marques			Ret												0
-	(Brazil) Giovanni Girotto			Ret												0
-	(Brazil) Ruslan Carta Filho			Ret												0
-	(Uruguay) Juan Manuel Casella						DNS	DNS								0
-	(Brazil) Marcio Basso	WD	WD													0
Pos.	Driver	INT (Brazil)		CUR (Brazil)	RIV (Uruguay)		ELP (Uruguay)		RCU (Argentina)		BUE (Argentina)	AGR (Argentina)		CDU (Argentina)		Pts.

Colour	Result
Gold	Winner
Silver	Second place
Bronze	Third place
Green	Points classification
Blue	Non-points classification
Blue	Non-classified finish (NC)
Purple	Retired, not classified (Ret)
Red	Did not qualify (DNQ)
Red	Did not pre-qualify (DNPQ)
Black	Disqualified (DSQ)
White	Did not start (DNS)
White	Withdrew (WD)
White	Race cancelled (C)
Blank	Did not practice (DNP)
Blank	Did not arrive (DNA)
Blank	Excluded (EX)

† – Drivers did not finish the race, but were classified as they completed over 75% of the race distance.

=== Teams' championship ===
Pos.	Team	INT (Brazil)		CUR (Brazil)	RIV (Uruguay)		ELP (Uruguay)		RCU (Argentina)		BUE (Argentina)	AGR (Argentina)		CDU (Argentina)		Pts.
Pos.	Team	RD1	RD2	RD1	RD2	RDU	RD1	RD2	RD1	RD2	RDU	RD1	RD2	RD1	RD2	Pts.
1	(Brazil) W2 ProGP	1^{2}	1	4^{3}	2^{2}	1	2^{4}	5	3	4	1^{3}	2	3^{3}	1^{2}	2	514
1	(Brazil) W2 ProGP	2^{1}	DSQ	6	4	9	4^{3}	Ret	5	5	5^{5}	6	5	2^{3}	8†	514
2	(Brazil) Cobra Racing Team	3^{4}	4	1	5	2	1^{1}	1	8	6	4^{4}	5	4^{5}	3^{1}	5	377
2	(Brazil) Cobra Racing Team	7	Ret	7†	8	7	8	8	10	DSQ	12	8	9	6	9	377
3	(Argentina) Squadra Martino	5^{3}	3	5^{4}	7^{5}	DNS	3^{5}	3	6^{4}	7	2^{1}	3	6	5	3	349
3	(Argentina) Squadra Martino	6	5	Ret^{1}	12†	DNS	10†	8	9	8	3^{2}	7	7	7†^{5}	6	349
4	(Argentina) PMO Motorsport				1^{1}	4	6	2	1^{1}	2	6	1	1^{1}	DNS^{4}	1	333
4	(Argentina) PMO Motorsport				3	10†	9	Ret	7^{3}	3	9	4	2^{2}			333
5	(United States) KMW Motorsports with PropCar	4^{5}	2	3	6	3	5	6	11	9	11	Ret	8			170
5	(United States) KMW Motorsports with PropCar	9†	Ret	Ret	9	8	DNS	DNS	Ret	Ret	Ret	Ret	11†			170
6	(Brazil) Scuderia Chiarelli			2^{2}	10	5					7					113
6	(Brazil) Scuderia Chiarelli			Ret	11^{3}	6					8					113
7	(Peru) Perú Racing Team				WD	WD	7^{2}	4	2^{2}	1						75
8	(Argentina) PMO Racing											DNS	DNS^{4}	4	7	24
9	(Brazil) MC Tubarão	8	6	Ret												18
9	(Brazil) MC Tubarão	Ret	Ret													18
Pos.	Team	INT (Brazil)		CUR (Brazil)	RIV (Uruguay)		ELP (Uruguay)		RCU (Argentina)		BUE (Argentina)	AGR (Argentina)		CDU (Argentina)		Pts.

Colour	Result
Gold	Winner
Silver	Second place
Bronze	Third place
Green	Points classification
Blue	Non-points classification
Blue	Non-classified finish (NC)
Purple	Retired, not classified (Ret)
Red	Did not qualify (DNQ)
Red	Did not pre-qualify (DNPQ)
Black	Disqualified (DSQ)
White	Did not start (DNS)
White	Withdrew (WD)
White	Race cancelled (C)
Blank	Did not practice (DNP)
Blank	Did not arrive (DNA)
Blank	Excluded (EX)

† – Drivers did not finish the race, but were classified as they completed over 75% of the race distance.

=== Trophy' championship ===
Pos.	Driver	Pts.
1	(Brazil) Adalberto Baptista	324
2	(Brazil) Fabio Casagrande	266
3	(Argentina) Ernesto Bessone	165
4	(Argentina) Pablo Otero	100
5	(Argentina) Javier Manta	55
6	(Uruguay) Diego Martínez	48
7	(Brazil) Guilherme Reischl	44
8	(Argentina) Claudio Rama	44
9	(Uruguay) Enrique Maglione	36
10	(Argentina) Roy Block	31
11	(Brazil) Thiago Marques	5
12	(Brazil) Geciel de Andrade	1
NC	(Brazil) Marcio Basso	0
