= Mygale M14-F4 =

French race car

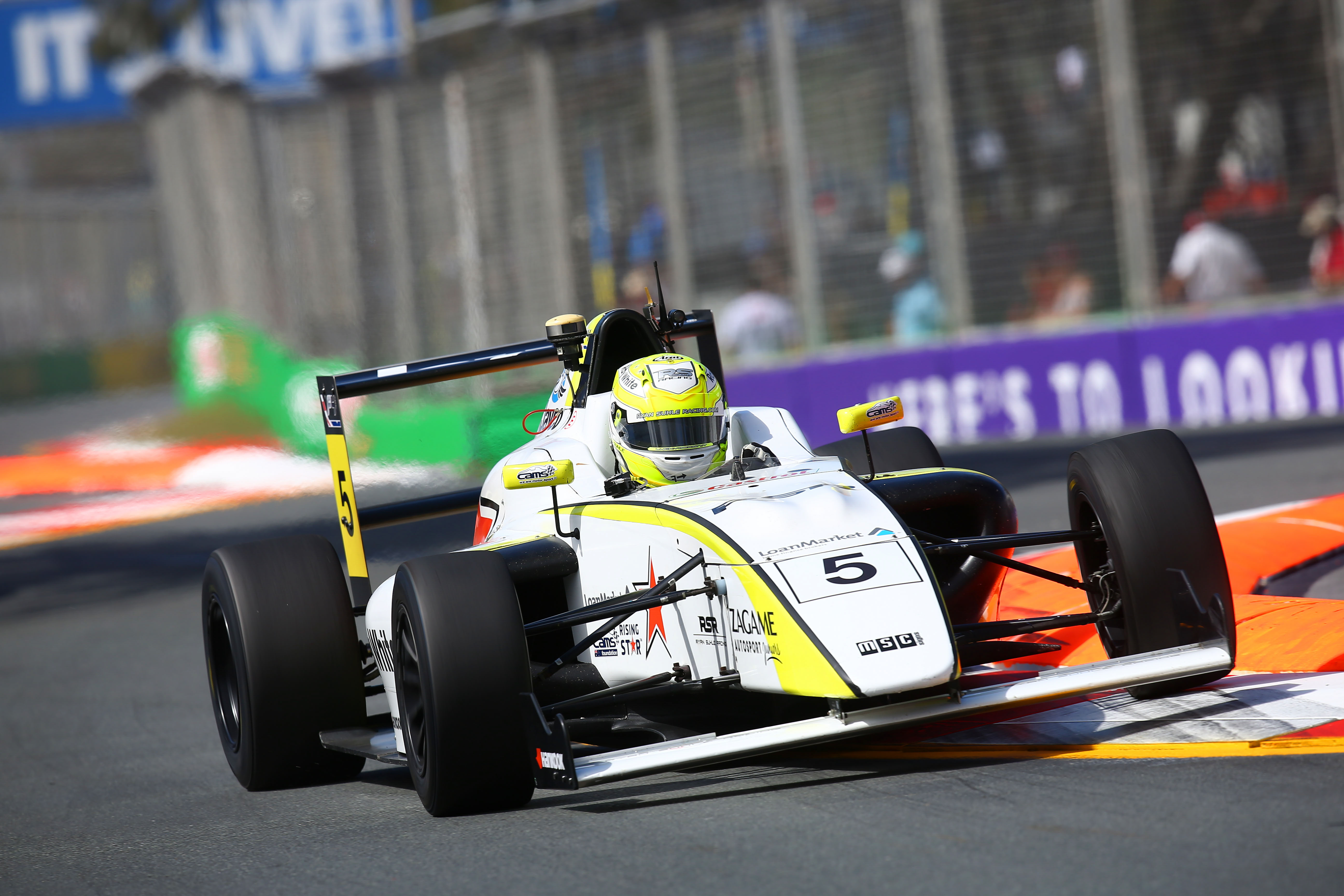
- Constructor: Mygale
- Successor: Mygale M21-F4

Technical specifications
- Chassis: Carbon-fiber monocoque
- Suspension (front): Push-rod with twin non-adjustable shock absorbers, adjustable anti-roll bar and third element
- Suspension (rear): Push-rod with twin non-adjustable shock absorbers, adjustable anti-roll bar and third element
- Length: 4,475 mm (176 in)
- Width: 1,715–1,725 mm (68–68 in) including tyres
- Height: 958 mm (38 in)
- Axle track: 1,493.5 mm (59 in) (front); 1,430.4 mm (56 in) (rear)
- Wheelbase: 2,742 mm (108 in)
- Engine: Geely-Renault 2.0 L (122 cu in) DOHC inline-4 naturally-aspirated, longitudinally mounted in a mid-engined, rear-wheel drive layout Ford 1.6 L (98 cu in) DOHC inline-4 turbocharged, longitudinally mounted in a mid-engined, rear-wheel drive layout
- Transmission: SADEV SL75-14 6-speed semi-automatic sequential gearbox
- Power: 160 hp (119 kW)
- Weight: 585 kg (1,290 lb) including driver
- Fuel: Various unleaded control fuel
- Lubricants: Various
- Brakes: 2-piston calipers Ventilated cast iron brake discs
- Tyres: Various

Competition history
- Debut: 2014

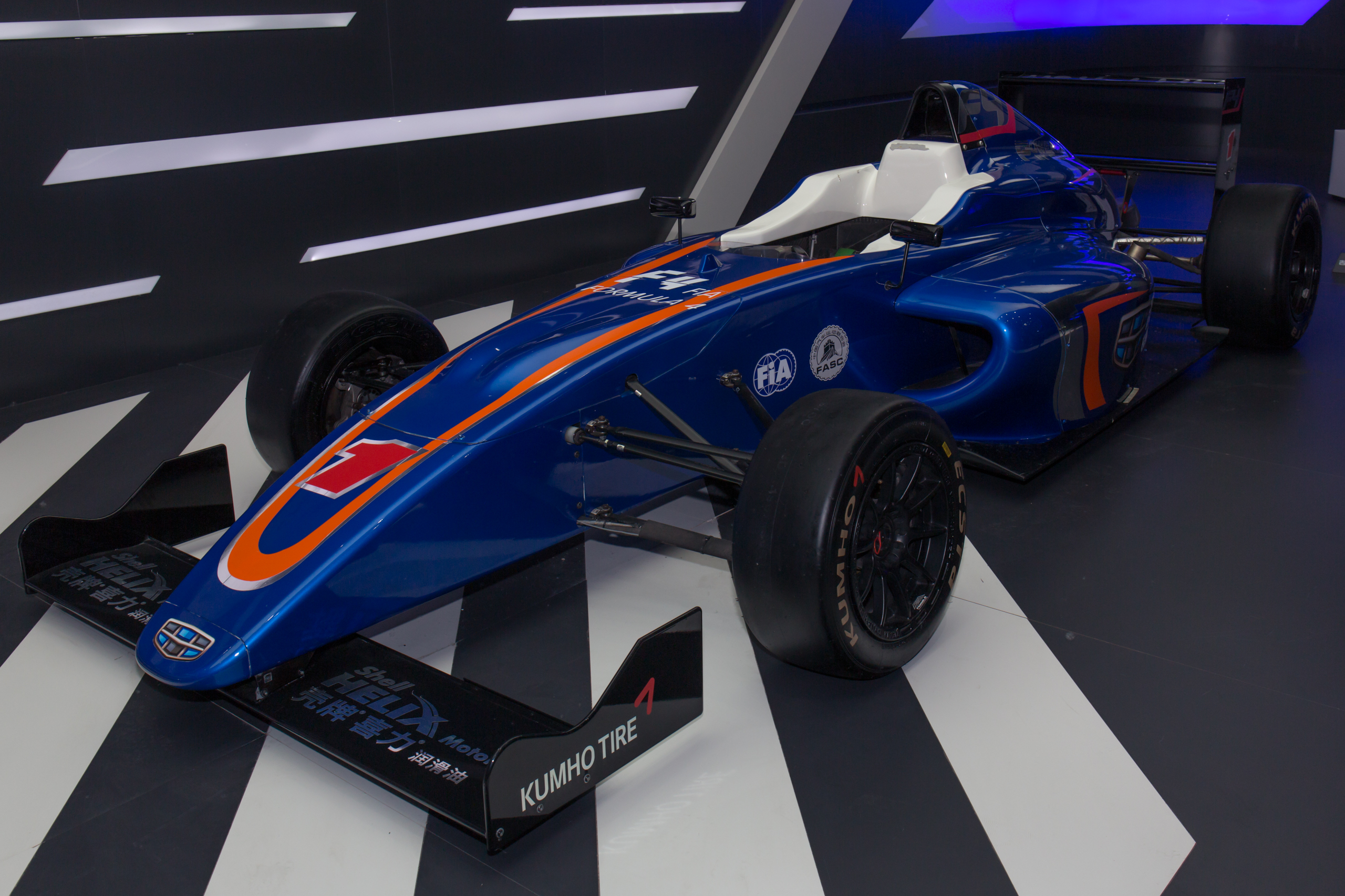
Mygale M14-F4 on display.

The Mygale M14-F4 is an open-wheel formula race car, designed and built by French manufacturer Mygale, for Formula 4 junior categories, since 2014.

The car has been used in several championships across the world:

- NACAM Formula 4 Championship (2015–2023)
- Formula 4 Australian Championship (2015–2019)
- F4 British Championship (2015–2021)
- F4 Chinese Championship (2015–2023)
- F4 South East Asia Championship (2016–2019)
- F4 Danish Championship (2017–2023)
- F4 French Championship (2018–2021)
- F4 Argentina Championship (2021) - F4 Indian Championship
