= List of Formula Renault 2.0 champions =

This is a list of Formula Renault 2.0 Champions, a list of racing drivers who have been named champions in a variety of Formula Renault championships. This list does not include champions of the World Series by Renault or Formula V6 Asia competitions.

== By year ==
=== Europe ===
Year	(France) (Spain) (Portugal) (Belgium) Western Europe(1)	Europe	United Kingdom		(Germany) (Netherlands) (Belgium) Northern Europe	Italy	(Denmark) (Sweden) Nordic		Spain	(Switzerland) (France) (Germany) (Austria) Middle Europe(2)	Portugal
Year	(France) (Spain) (Portugal) (Belgium) Western Europe(1)	Europe	UK	BARC	(Germany) (Netherlands) (Belgium) Northern Europe	Italy	Finland	Sweden	Spain	(Switzerland) (France) (Germany) (Austria) Middle Europe(2)	Portugal
2020	not held	(France) Victor Martins	not held	not held	not held	not held	not held	not held	not held	not held	not held
2019	not held	(New Zealand) Oscar Piastri	not held	not held	not held	not held	not held	not held	not held	not held	not held
2018	not held	(United Kingdom) Max Fewtrell	not held	not held	(Germany) Doureid Ghattas	not held	not held	not held	not held	not held	not held
2017	not held	(France) Sacha Fenestraz	not held	not held	(Morocco) Michaël Benyahia	not held	not held	not held	not held	not held	not held
2016	not held	(United Kingdom) Lando Norris	not held	not held	(United Kingdom) Lando Norris	not held	not held	not held	not held	not held	not held
2015	not held	(United Kingdom) Jack Aitken	not held	not held	(Switzerland) Louis Deletraz	not held	not held	not held	not held	(United Kingdom) Jack Aitken	not held
2014	not held	(Netherlands) Nyck de Vries	not held	(Brazil) Pietro Fittipaldi	(United Kingdom) Ben Barnicoat	not held	not held	not held	not held	(Netherlands) Nyck de Vries	not held
2013	not held	(France) Pierre Gasly	not held	(United Kingdom) Chris Middlehurst	(United Kingdom) Matt Parry	not held	not held	not held	not held	(Italy) Antonio Fuoco	not held
2012	not held	(Belgium) Stoffel Vandoorne	not held	(United Kingdom) Scott Malvern	(United Kingdom) Jake Dennis	(Italy) Kevin Gilardoni	not held	not held	not held	(Russia) Daniil Kvyat	not held
2011	not held	(Netherlands) Robin Frijns	(United Kingdom) Alex Lynn	(United Kingdom) Dino Zamparelli	(Spain) Carlos Sainz Jr.	(Italy) Andrea Boffo	not held	not held	not held	(Spain) Javier Tarancón	not held
2010	not held	(Estonia) Kevin Korjus	(Sweden) Tom Blomqvist (United Kingdom) Alex Lynn	(United Kingdom) Alice Powell (United Kingdom) Josh Webster	(Belgium) Ludwig Ghidi (Denmark) Dear Schilling	(Italy) Francesco Frisone	(Finland) Miika Kunranta	(Sweden) Daniel Roos	not held	(Switzerland) Zoël Amberg	not held
2009	(Spain) Albert Costa	(Spain) Albert Costa	(United Kingdom) Dean Smith (United Kingdom) Harry Tincknell	(United Kingdom) Kieren Clark	(Portugal) António Félix da Costa	(Italy) Daniel Mancinelli	(Finland) Jukka Honkavuori	(Sweden) Felix Rosenqvist	not held	(Switzerland) Nico Müller	not held
2008	(Australia) Daniel Ricciardo	(Finland) Valtteri Bottas	(United Kingdom) Adam Christodoulou (United Kingdom) James Calado	(United Kingdom) Ollie Hancock (United Kingdom) James Theodore	(Finland) Valtteri Bottas	(Norway) Pål Varhaug (Italy) Daniel Mancinelli	(Finland) Jesse Krohn	not held	not held	(Switzerland) Christopher Zanella	(Portugal) Gonçalo Araújo (United Kingdom) James Calado
2007	(France) Jules Bianchi	(New Zealand) Brendon Hartley	(United Kingdom) Duncan Tappy (United Kingdom) Richard Singleton	(United Kingdom) Hywel Lloyd (United Kingdom) Hywel Lloyd	(Germany) Frank Kechele	(Finland) Mika Mäki (Brazil) César Ramos	not held		not held	(Czech Republic) Adam Kout	not held
2006	(France) Laurent Groppi	(Portugal) Filipe Albuquerque	(Sweden) Sebastian Hohenthal (France) Franck Mailleux	(United Kingdom) Ian Pearson	(Portugal) Filipe Albuquerque	(Spain) Dani Clos (Spain) Jaime Alguersuari	(Denmark) Steffen Møller		not held	(Switzerland) Jonathan Hirschi	not held
2005	(France) Romain Grosjean	(Japan) Kamui Kobayashi	(United Kingdom) Oliver Jarvis (Netherlands) Junior Strous	(United Kingdom) Nick Wilcox	(Finland) Pekka Saarinen (Netherlands) Renger van der Zande (NLD)	(Japan) Kamui Kobayashi (Finland) Atte Mustonen	(Denmark) Jesper Wulff Laursen		not held	(Switzerland) Ralph Meichtry	not held
2004	(France) Patrick Pilet	(United States) Scott Speed	(United Kingdom) Mike Conway (United Kingdom) Stuart Hall	(United Kingdom) Nicky Wilson	(United States) Scott Speed (Netherlands) Junior Strous (NLD)	(Venezuela) Pastor Maldonado (Russia) Mikhail Aleshin	(Denmark) Kasper Andersen		not held	(Switzerland) Nicolas Maulini	not held
2003	(France) Loïc Duval	(Argentina) Esteban Guerrieri	(United Kingdom) Lewis Hamilton (United Kingdom) Jay Howard	(United Kingdom) James Gornall	(United Kingdom) Ryan Sharp (Netherlands) Paul Meijer (NLD)	(France) Franck Perera (Venezuela) Pastor Maldonado	(Denmark) Tom Pedersen		not held	(Switzerland) Manuel Benz	not held
2002	(France) Alexandre Prémat	(France) Eric Salignon	(United Kingdom) Danny Watts (United Kingdom) Robert Bell	(United Kingdom) Jeremy Smith	(Austria) Christian Klien	(Argentina) José María López (Finland) Toni Vilander	(Denmark) Philip Andersen		not held	(Germany) Thomas Conrad	not held
2001	(France) Eric Salignon	(Brazil) Augusto Farfus	(United Kingdom) Carl Breeze (United Kingdom) Robert Bell	(United Kingdom) Martin Wallbank	(Germany) Marcel Lasée	(Australia) Ryan Briscoe (Brazil) Roberto Streit	not held		not held	not held	not held
2000	(France) Renaud Derlot	(Brazil) Felipe Massa	(Finland) Kimi Räikkönen (United Kingdom) Mark McLoughlin	(United Kingdom) Jamie Beales	not held	(Brazil) Felipe Massa	not held		not held	not held	not held
1999	(France) Lucas Lassere	(Italy) Gianmaria Bruni	(Brazil) Antônio Pizzonia (Finland) Kimi Räikkönen	(United Kingdom) Elliot Lewis	(Finland) Kari Mäenpää	not held	not held		not held	not held	not held
1998	(United Kingdom) Matthew Davies	(France) Bruno Besson	(Brazil) Aluizio Coelho (Brazil) Antônio Pizzonia	(United Kingdom) Nick Dudfield	(Netherlands) Hugo van der Ham	not held	not held		not held	not held	not held
1997	(France) Jonathan Cochet	(Belgium) Jeffrey van Hooydonk	(United Kingdom) Marc Hynes	(United Kingdom) Peter Clarke	(Austria) Robert Lechner	not held	not held		(Spain) Polo Villaamil	not held	not held
1996	(France) Sébastien Enjolras	(Brazil) Enrique Bernoldi	(United Kingdom) David Cook	(United Kingdom) Ian Astley	(Germany) Alexander Müller	not held	not held		(Portugal) Bruno Correia	not held	not held
1995	(France) Cyrille Sauvage	(France) Cyrille Sauvage	(United Kingdom) Guy Smith	(United Kingdom) David Henderson	(Germany) Ralf Druckenmüller	not held	not held		(Spain) Javier Díaz	not held	not held
1994	(France) Stéphane Sarrazin	(United Kingdom) James Matthews	(United Kingdom) James Matthews	not held	(Germany) Marcel Tiemann	not held	not held		(Spain) Javier Díaz	not held	not held
1993	(France) David Dussau	(France) Olivier Couvreur	(Spain) Ivan Arias	not held	(Germany) Arnd Meier	not held	not held		(Spain) David Bosch	not held	not held
1992	(France) Jean-Philippe Belloc	(Spain) Pedro de la Rosa	(Spain) Pedro de la Rosa	not held	(Germany) Thomas Wöhrle	not held	not held		(Spain) Ricardo García Galiano	not held	not held
1991	(France) Olivier Couvreur	(United Kingdom) Jason Plato	(United Kingdom) Bobby Verdon-Roe	not held	(Germany) Joachim Beule (Netherlands) Frank ten Wolde (NLD)	not held	not held		(Spain) Antonio Albacete	not held	not held
1990	(France) Emmanuel Collard	not held	(Brazil) Thomas Erdos	not held	not held	not held	not held		not held	not held	not held
1989	(France) Olivier Panis	not held	(United Kingdom) Neil Riddiford	not held	not held	not held	not held		not held	not held	not held
1988	(France) Ludovic Faure	not held	not held	not held	not held	not held	not held		not held	not held	not held
1987	(France) Claude Degremont	not held	not held	not held	not held	not held	not held		not held	not held	not held
1986	(France) Érik Comas	not held	not held	not held	not held	not held	not held		not held	not held	not held
1985	(France) Éric Bernard	not held	not held	not held	not held	not held	not held		not held	not held	not held
1984	(France) Yannick Dalmas	not held	not held	not held	not held	not held	not held		not held	not held	not held
1983	(France) Jean-Pierre Hoursourigaray	not held	not held	not held	not held	not held	not held		not held	not held	not held
1982	(France) Gilles Lempereur	not held	not held	not held	not held	not held	not held		not held	not held	not held
1981	(France) Philippe Renault	not held	not held	not held	not held	not held	not held		not held	not held	not held
1980	(France) Denis Morin	not held	not held	not held	not held	not held	not held		not held	not held	not held
1979	(France) Alain Ferté	not held	not held	not held	not held	not held	not held		not held	not held	not held
1978	(France) Philippe Alliot	not held	not held	not held	not held	not held	not held		not held	not held	not held
1977	(France) Joel Gouhier	(France) Alain Prost	not held	not held	not held	not held	not held		not held	not held	not held
1976	(France) Alain Prost	(France) Didier Pironi	not held	not held	not held	not held	not held		not held	not held	not held
1975	(France) Christian Debias	(France) René Arnoux	not held	not held	not held	not held	not held		not held	not held	not held
1974	not held	(France) Didier Pironi	not held	not held	not held	not held	not held		not held	not held	not held
1973	not held	(France) René Arnoux	not held	not held	not held	not held	not held		not held	not held	not held
1972	(France) Jacques Laffite	(France) Alain Cudini	not held	not held	not held	not held	not held		not held	not held	not held
1971	(France) Michel Leclère	not held	not held	not held	not held	not held	not held		not held	not held	not held
1970	(France) François Lacarrau	not held	not held	not held	not held	not held	not held		not held	not held	not held
1969	(France) Denis Dayan	not held	not held	not held	not held	not held	not held		not held	not held	not held
1968	(France) Max Jean	not held	not held	not held	not held	not held	not held		not held	not held	not held

=== America and Asia ===
American and Asian Formula Renault 2.0L championships winners
Year	Latin America (Mexico before 2005)	Brazil	Argentina	(United States) USA (North America before 2004)	Asia	China
2024	not held	not held	Santiago Chiarello	not held	not held	not held
2023	not held	not held	Nicolás Suárez	not held	not held	not held
2022	not held	not held	Tiago Pernía	not held	(Hong Kong) Gerrard Xie	not held
2021	not held	not held	Jorge Barrio	not held	not held	not held
2020	not held	not held	Jorge Barrio	not held	not held	not held
2019	not held	not held	Guido Moggia	not held	(Netherlands) Joey Alders	not held
2018	not held	not held	Lucas Vicino	not held	(China) Daniel Cao	not held
2017	not held	not held	Hernán Satler	not held	(Macau) Charles Leong	not held
2016	not held	not held	Rudi Bundziak	not held	(Australia) Josh Burdon	not held
2015	not held	not held	Martín Moggia	not held	(United Kingdom) Dan Wells	not held
2014	not held	not held	Manuel Mallo	not held	(United Kingdom) Alice Powell	not held
2013	not held	not held	Julián Santero	not held	(Colombia) Julio Acosta	not held
2012	not held	not held	Carlos Javier Merlo	not held	(Japan) Yosuke Yamazaki	not held
2011	not held	not held	Rodrigo Rogani	not held	(Finland) Leopold Ringbom	not held
2010	not held	not held	Nicolás Trosset	not held	(Thailand) Sandy Nicholas Stuvik	not held
2009	not held	not held	not held	not held	(Israel) Alon Day	not held
2008	(Mexico) Xavier Razo	not held	not held	not held	(Hong Kong) Jim Ka To	(United States) Geoffrey Kwong
2007	(Mexico) Victor Hugo Oliveras	not held	not held	(United States) Bill Goshen	(Finland) Pekka Saarinen	(Finland) Pekka Saarinen
2006	(Mexico) Homero Richards	(Brazil) Felipe Lapenna	not held	(United States) Carl Skerlong	(Finland) Pekka Saarinen	(Switzerland) Alexandre Imperatori
2005	(Mexico) Germán Quiroga	(Brazil) Nelson Merlo	not held	(United States) Seth Ingham	(Taiwan) Hanss Lin	(Taiwan) Hanss Lin
2004	(Mexico) Homero Richards	(Brazil) Daniel Serra	not held	(United States) Colin Braun; Junior Strous	(Japan) Hideaki Nakao	not held
2003	(Mexico) Homero Richards	(Brazil) Allam Khodair	not held	(Canada) Andrew Ranger; Charles Hall	(Macau) Rodolfo Ávila	not held
2002	(Mexico) David Martínez	(Brazil) Sérgio Jimenez	not held	(Canada) Bruno Spengler	(China) Congfu Cheng	not held

- (1) = French Formula Renault before 2008.
- (2) = Formula Renault 2.0 Switzerland up to 2009.
- small writing and flags indicate Winter Series champion.
- (NLD) = Formula Renault Netherlands champions.
- The French championships from 1968 to 1970 were held as the "Formula France".

== Multiple-champions ==
	Driver	Titles
3	(Mexico) Homero Richards	2003, 2004 and 2006 Latin America
3	(Finland) Pekka Saarinen	2005 Germany, 2006 and 2007 Asia
2 same season	(United Kingdom) Jack Aitken	2015 Europe and NEC
2 same season	(Portugal) Filipe Albuquerque	2006 Europe and NEC
2 same season	(Finland) Valtteri Bottas	2008 Europe and NEC
2 same season	(Spain) Albert Costa	2009 Europe and WEC
2 same season	(Spain) Pedro de la Rosa	1992 Europe and United Kingdom
2 same season	(Japan) Kamui Kobayashi	2005 Europe and Italy
2 same season	(Brazil) Felipe Massa	2000 Europe and Italy
2 same season	(United Kingdom) James Matthews	1994 Europe and United Kingdom
2 same season	(United Kingdom) Lando Norris	2016 Europe and NEC
2 same season	(France) Cyrille Sauvage	1995 Europe and France
2 same season	(United States) Scott Speed	2004 Europe and Germany
2 same season	(Netherlands) Nyck de Vries	2014 Europe and MEC
2	(France) René Arnoux	1973 and 1975 Europe
2	(France) Olivier Couvreur	1991 France, 1993 Europe
2	(Spain) Javier Díaz	1993 and 1994 Spain
2	(France) Didier Pironi	1974 and 1976 Europe
2	(France) Alain Prost	1976 France, 1977 Europe
2	(France) Eric Salignon	2001 France, 2002 Europe
