= Nicolás Varrone =

Argentine racing driver

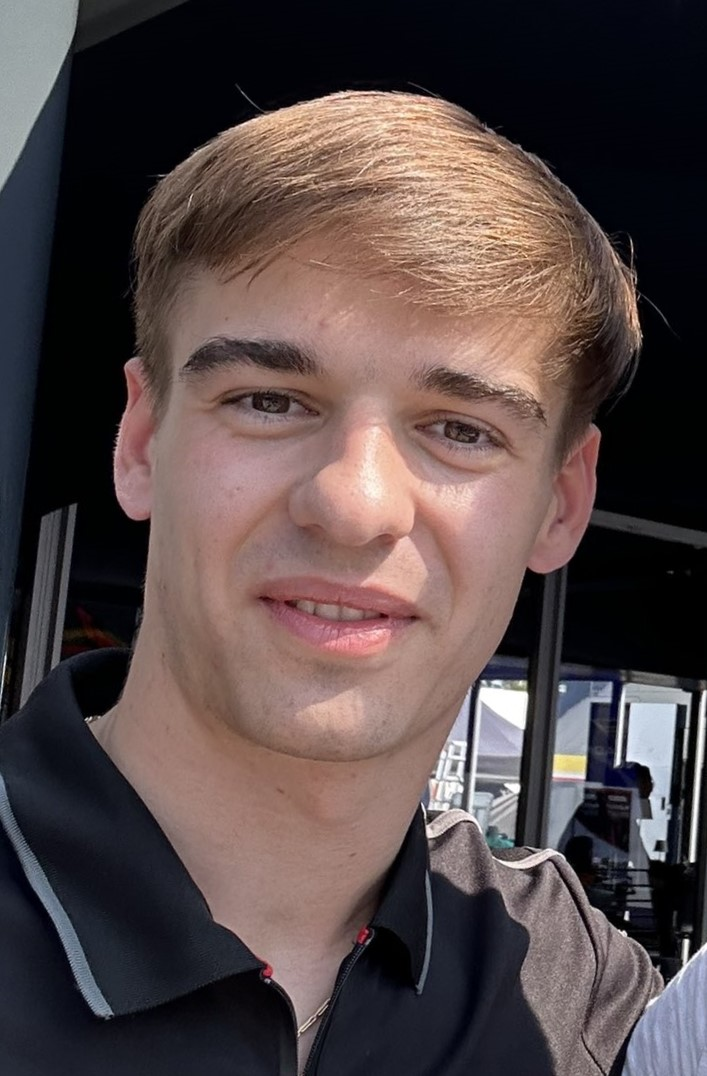
- Varrone in 2023
- Nationality: (Argentina) Argentine
- Born: Nicolás Martín Varrone; 6 December 2000 (age 25) Ingeniero Maschwitz, Buenos Aires, Argentina

FIA Formula 2 Championship career
- Debut season: 2026
- Current team: Van Amersfoort Racing
- Categorisation: FIA Silver (until 2023); FIA Gold (2024–)
- Car number: 22
- Starts: 22
- Wins: 0
- Poles: 0
- Fastest laps: 1
- Best finish: TBD in 2026

Previous series
- 2023, 2025; 2023–2024-25; 2022, 2024 2022; 2022, 2024; 2021; 2020–2021; 2020; 2019–2020; 2019; 2018; 2018; 2016–2018: FIA World Endurance Championship; Asian Le Mans Series; Nürburgring Langstrecken-Serie; 24H GT Series; European Le Mans Series; GT World Challenge Europe Endurance Cup; Le Mans Cup; International GT Open; BRDC British Formula 3; Porsche GT3 Cup Trophy Argentina TC2000 V de V Challenge Monoplace; Formula Renault 2.0 Argentina
- Statistics up to date as of 25 August 2026.

Nicolás Martín "Nico" Varrone (born 6 December 2000) is an Argentine racing driver who last competed in the FIA Formula 2 Championship for Van Amersfoort Racing. He is a factory driver for Corvette Racing.

Born and raised in Buenos Aires, Varrone began in competitive karting before graduating to junior formulae in 2016. After debuting in Formula Renault 2.0 Argentina, he won the 2018 V de V Challenge Monoplace as a rookie. He was forced to exit formula racing in 2020 due to a lack of funding, leading to a transition to sports car racing full-time in 2021 with support from Rinaldi Racing, finishing third in the Le Mans Cup's LMP3 class.

Varrone previously competed in the FIA World Endurance Championship in LM GTE and Le Mans Hypercar. In his rookie season in 2023, he won the LMGTE Am class title with Corvette Racing alongside Nicky Catsburg and Ben Keating. He is a two-time class winner at the 24 Hours of Le Mans, winning in LMGTE Am in 2023 with Catsburg and Keating, and in LMP2 Pro-Am in 2024 with Ben Barnicoat and François Perrodo.

== Early career ==
Having competed in karting, Varrone made his car racing debut in the national Formula Renault category at the end of 2016. He remained in the series the following year and ended up 20th in the standings.

A move to Europe followed in 2018, as Varrone joined the V de V Challenge Monoplace, first driving for Inter Europol Competition before switching to TS Corse. The Argentine dominated, taking six wins from 14 races and claiming the title. This made him the final champion of the series' history.

In a 2019 season plagued by monetary concerns, Varrone took part in three rounds of the BRDC British Formula 3 Championship with Hillspeed, where he was able to win the reversed-grid race at Spa-Francorchamps. As a consequence, he signed for Chris Dittmann Racing for the 2020 season. However, plans of running the entire season were scuppered by the COVID-19 pandemic, which meant that Varrone was forced to abandon his season after the opening pair of events.

== Sportscar career ==
After being forced to stop his British F3 campaign, Varrone returned home to Buenos Aires, thinking that he would have to abandon his racing career to work in the family business. However, manager Jose Balbiani managed to connect Varrone to Rinaldi Racing owner Michele Rinaldi, giving Varrone the chance to test an LMP3 car and subsequently partake in the final round of that year's Le Mans Cup.

In 2021, Rinaldi paired Varrone with Alexander Mattschull for the entire Le Mans Cup season, where three podiums earned the duo third place overall.

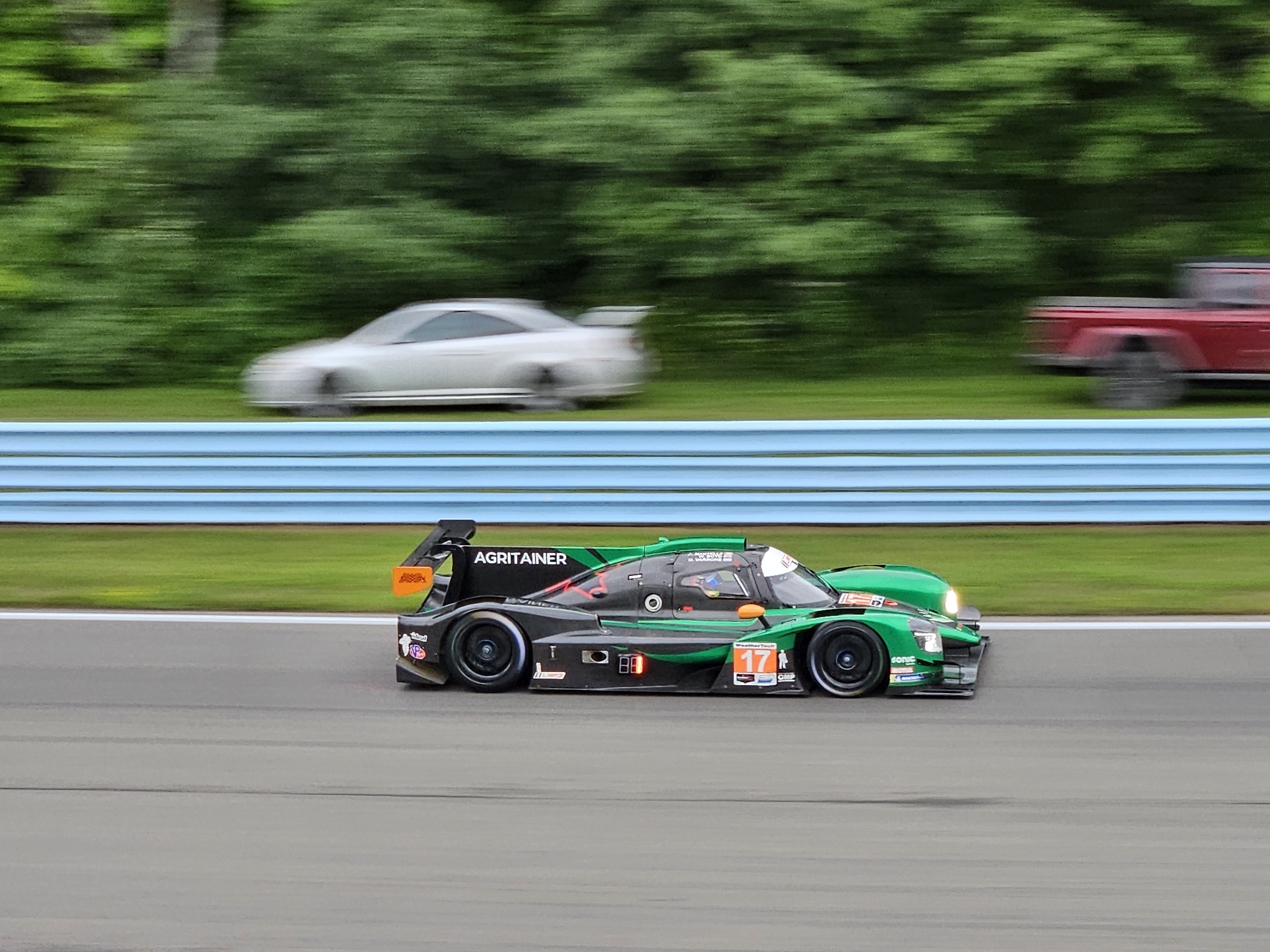
Varrone driving the No. 17 Duqueine M30 - D08 at the 2023 6 Hours of The Glen

In 2022, Varrone made his debut at the IMSA SportsCar Championship where he entered the Six Hours of The Glen in the LMP3 category. He then signed with the Canadian racing team AWA for the 2023 season.

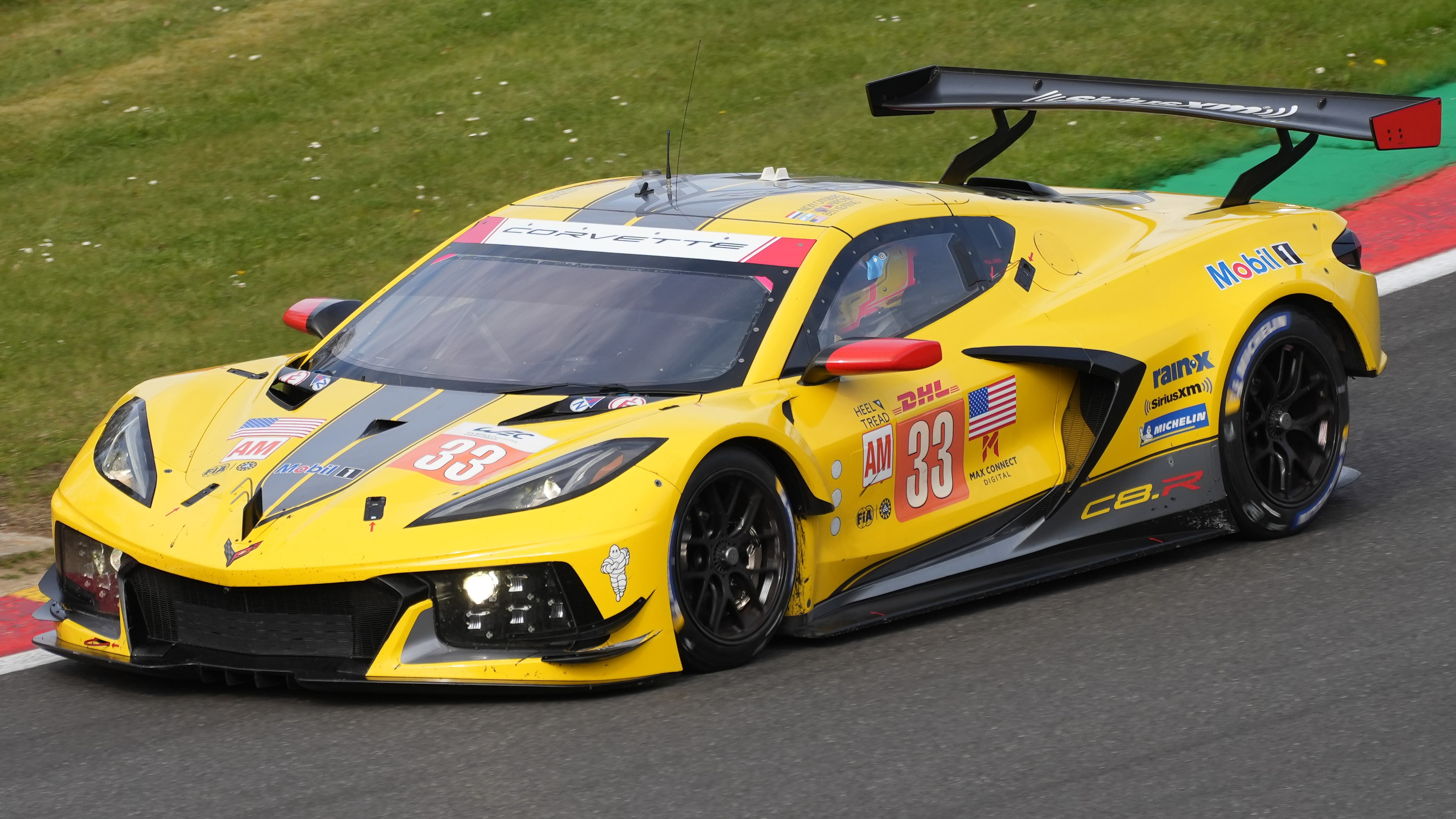
Varrone's No. 33 Corvette at the 2023 6 Hours of Spa

In January 2023, Varrone signed for Corvette Racing to contest the LMGTE Am class of the 2023 FIA World Endurance Championship, driving a Chevrolet Corvette C8.R alongside Nicky Catsburg and Ben Keating. He and his team had a successful year, not only winning their 24 Hours of Le Mans category but also their whole World Endurance Championship category. The campaign contained three race wins, as well as a fastest lap set by Varrone at Le Mans. As a result, Varrone was upgraded to the FIA Gold ranking ahead of 2024.

Ahead of the 2024 season, Varrone became a Corvette factory driver in light of a campaign in the GTD class of the IMSA SportsCar Championship. However, after retiring from the opening two races of the campaign due to car issues, Varrone's AWA Racing teammate Anthony Mantella decided to withdraw from the series. Varrone would soon find another drive, joining reigning 24 Hours of Nürburgring winners Frikadelli Racing for the 2024 event together with Luca Ludwig, Daniel Keilwitz, and Felipe Fernández Laser. The team finished 12th in the red-flagged race, with Varrone setting the fastest lap overall. Varrone also drove for AF Corse in the latter five rounds of the six-race ELMS campaign, where he scored a podium in Spa-Francorchamps.

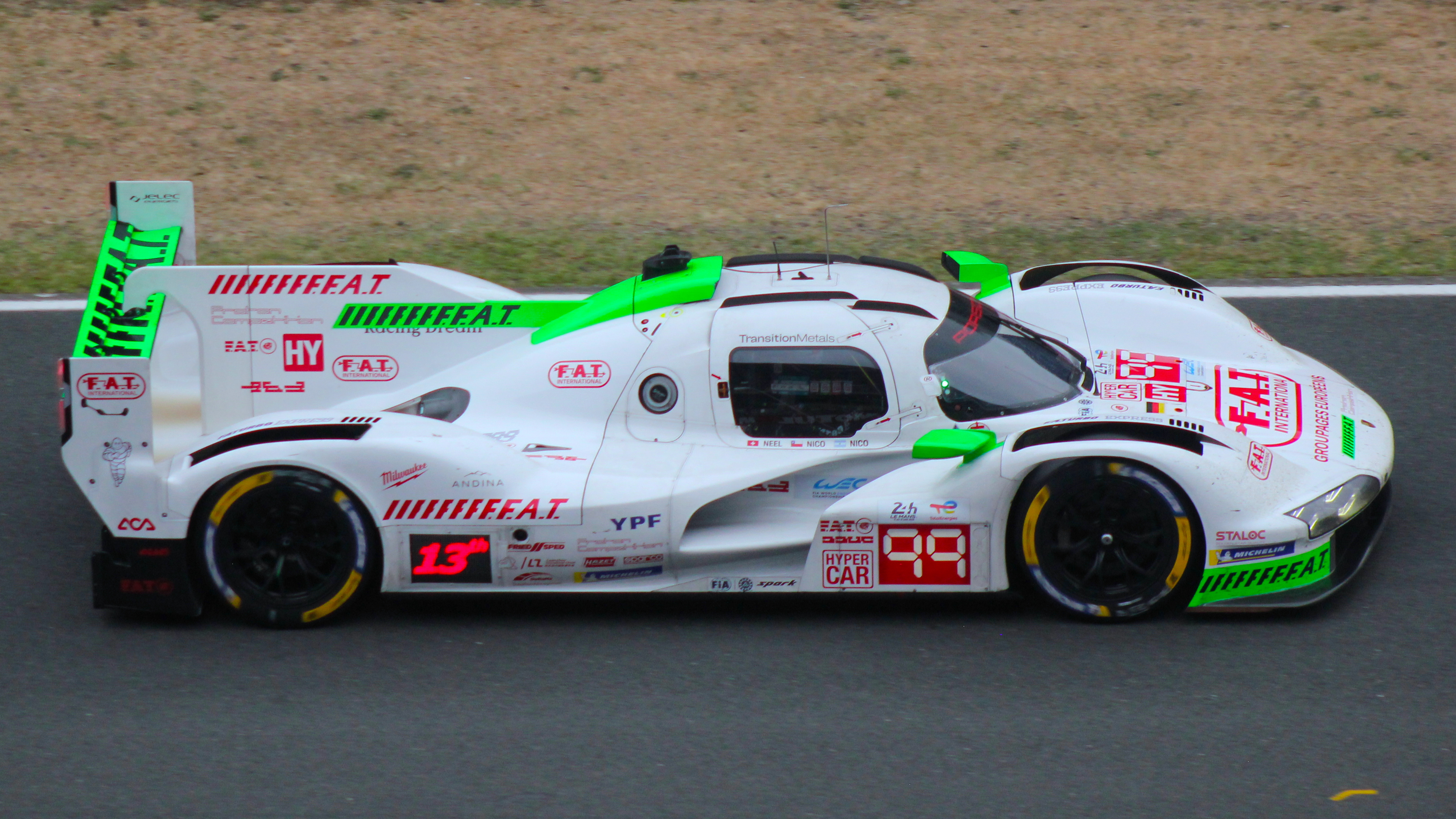
Varrone' No. 99 car at the 2025 24 Hours of Le Mans

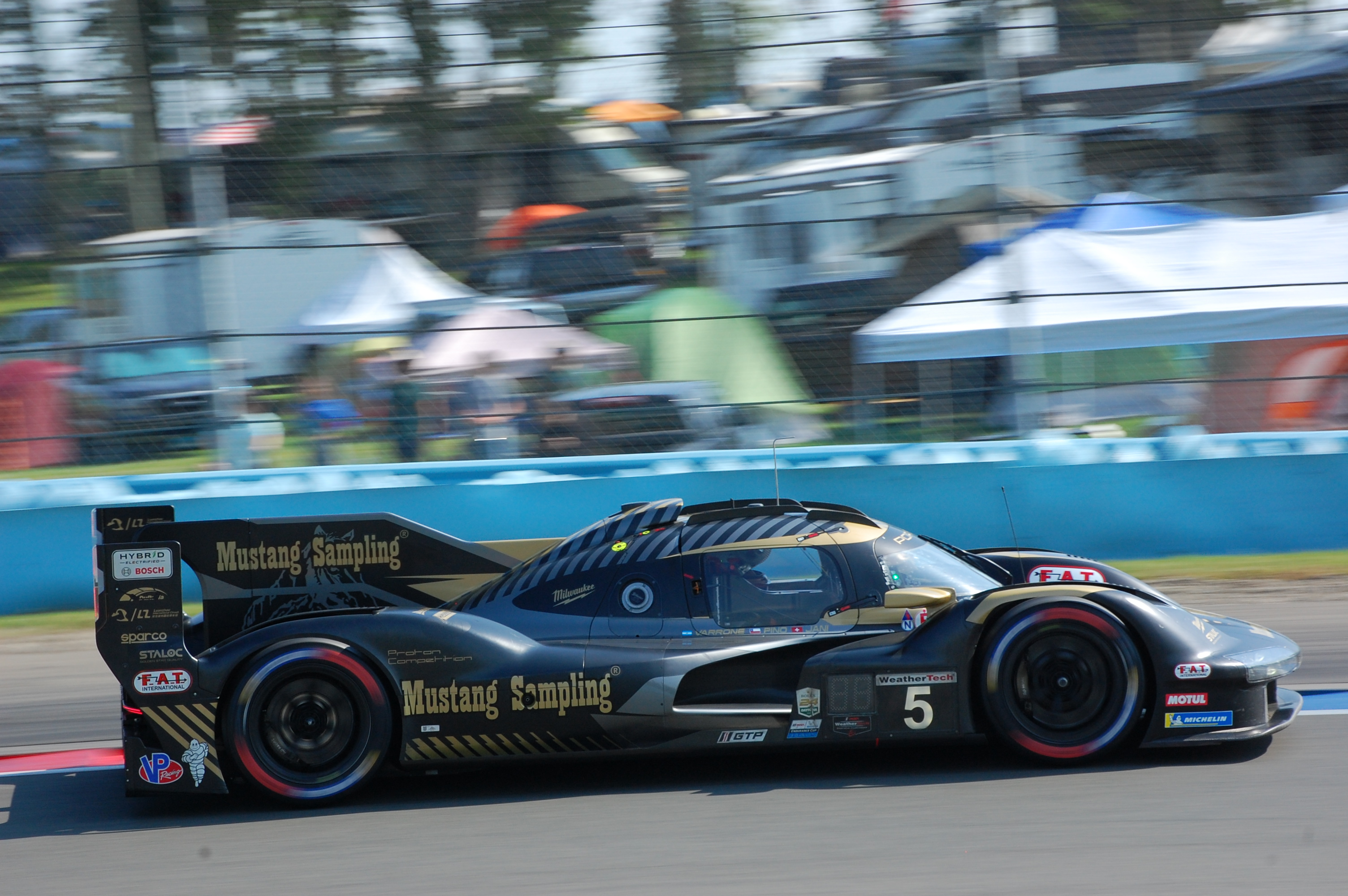
Varrone at Watkins Glen in 2025

Varrone made his LMP2 debut at the 2024 24 Hours of Le Mans, partnering Ben Barnicoat and gentleman driver François Perrodo in the LMP2 Pro-Am subclass. Despite lacking pace in the closing hours held under wet conditions, the trio won the Pro-Am subclass. Varrone made his contribution by taking and extending the overall lead during the night. The week after, Varrone raced in LMP2 once again, driving for DragonSpeed in the 6 Hours of The Glen.

For 2025, Varrone stepped up to the Hypercar class, taking part in a full-season drive alongside Neel Jani and Nico Pino for Porsche customer team Proton Competition. Varrone stated that the program was long in the making, and cited his relationship with Proton team manager Christian Ried as critical for his spot on the driver roster. Varrone also competed with the team in IMSA, provided that the races did not clash with his Michelin Endurance Cup commitments for Corvette Racing.

== Return to formula racing ==
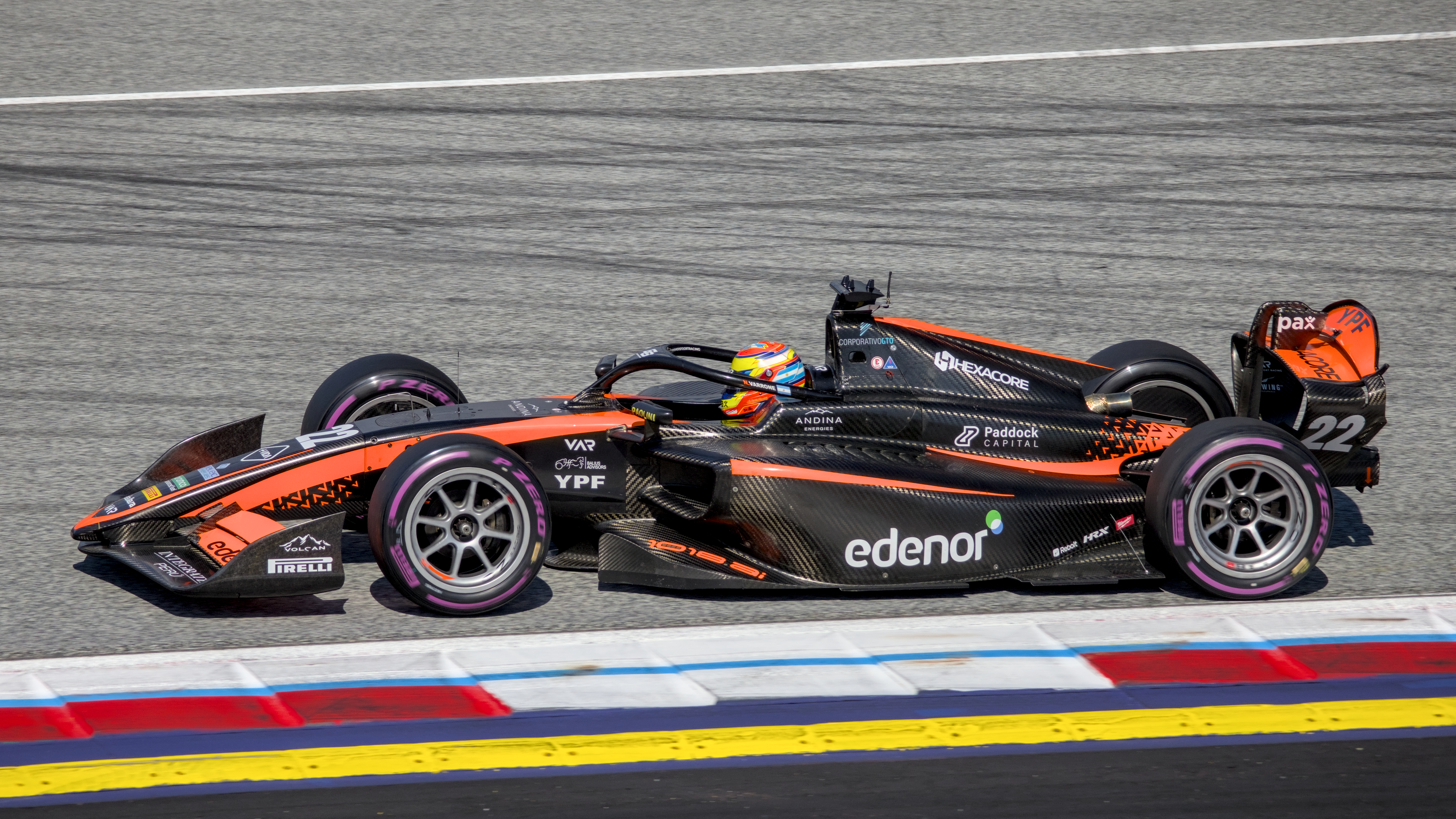
Varrone driving the Dallara F2 2024 during the 2026 Spielberg Formula 2 round

For the 2026 season, Varrone returned to formula racing as he made the move to Formula 2, signing for Van Amersfoort Racing. Prior to the Baku round, Varrone departed the team and the championship with immediate effect.

== Racing record ==
=== Career summary ===
| Season | Series | Team | Races | Wins | Poles | F/Laps | Podiums | Points | Position |
|---|---|---|---|---|---|---|---|---|---|
| 2016 | Fórmula Renault 2.0 Argentina | MS Racing Car | 4 | 0 | 0 | 0 | 0 | 15 | 27th |
| 2017 | Fórmula Renault 2.0 Argentina | MS Racing | 24 | 0 | 0 | 0 | 0 | 103 | 20th |
| 2018 | V de V Challenge Monoplace | Inter Europol Competition | 4 | 1 | 3 | 2 | 3 | 546 | **1st** |
| 2018 | V de V Challenge Monoplace | TS Corse | 10 | 5 | 10 | 6 | 8 | 546 | **1st** |
| 2018 | Fórmula Renault 2.0 Argentina | MS Racing | 14 | 0 | 0 | 0 | 0 | 107 | 18th |
| 2018 | TC2000 Championship | Riva Racing | 1 | 0 | 0 | 0 | 0 | 0 | NC† |
| 2019 | Porsche GT3 Cup Trophy Argentina | | ? | ? | ? | ? | ? | 14 | 9th |
| 2019 | BRDC British Formula 3 Championship | Hillspeed | 9 | 1 | 0 | 0 | 2 | 109 | 17th |
| 2020 | International GT Open | Team Lazarus | 1 | 0 | 0 | 0 | 0 | 0 | NC |
| 2020 | Le Mans Cup - LMP3 | Rinaldi Racing | 1 | 0 | 0 | 0 | 0 | 10 | 24th |
| 2020 | BRDC British Formula 3 Championship | Chris Dittmann Racing | 7 | 0 | 0 | 0 | 0 | 58 | 20th |
| 2021 | GT World Challenge Europe Endurance Cup | Rinaldi Racing | 1 | 0 | 0 | 0 | 0 | 0 | NC |
| 2021 | Le Mans Cup - LMP3 | Rinaldi Racing | 7 | 0 | 0 | 2 | 3 | 68 | **3rd** |
| 2022 | European Le Mans Series - LMGTE | Rinaldi Racing | 6 | 1 | 1 | 0 | 1 | 39 | 11th |
| 2022 | IMSA SportsCar Championship - LMP3 | FastMD Racing | 1 | 0 | 1 | 0 | 0 | 315 | 29th |
| 2022 | 24H GT Series - GT3 | Wochenspiegel Team Monschau | 1 | 1 | 0 | 1 | 1 | 0 | NC |
| 2022 | 24 Hours of Le Mans - LMGTE Am | Iron Lynx | 1 | 0 | 0 | 0 | 0 | N/A | 17th |
| 2022 | Nürburgring Langstrecken-Serie - VT3 | Team Mathol Racing e.V. | 3 | 2 | 2 | 2 | 2 | 0 | NC† |
| 2022 | Nürburgring Langstrecken-Serie - VT2-FWD | | 1 | 0 | 0 | 0 | 0 | 0 | NC† |
| 2023 | Asian Le Mans Series - LMP3 | WTM by Rinaldi Racing | 4 | 0 | 4 | 1 | 1 | 31 | 5th |
| 2023 | FIA World Endurance Championship - LMGTE Am | Corvette Racing | 7 | 3 | 0 | 1 | 5 | 173 | **1st** |
| 2023 | 24 Hours of Le Mans - LMGTE Am | Corvette Racing | 1 | 1 | 1 | 1 | 1 | N/A | **1st** |
| 2023 | IMSA SportsCar Championship - LMP3 | AWA | 4 | 1 | 0 | 0 | 2 | 882 | 13th |
| 2023 | GT World Challenge Europe Endurance Cup | AF Corse | 1 | 0 | 0 | 0 | 0 | 0 | NC |
| 2024 | IMSA SportsCar Championship - GTD | AWA | 2 | 0 | 0 | 0 | 0 | 251 | 56th |
| 2024 | IMSA SportsCar Championship - LMP2 | DragonSpeed | 1 | 0 | 0 | 1 | 0 | 230 | 54th |
| 2024 | Nürburgring Langstrecken-Serie - SP9 | Frikadelli Racing Team | 1 | 0 | 0 | 0 | 0 | * | * |
| 2024 | 24 Hours of Nürburgring - SP9 | Frikadelli Racing Team | 1 | 0 | 0 | 1 | 0 | N/A | 12th |
| 2024 | European Le Mans Series - LMGT3 | AF Corse | 5 | 0 | 0 | 1 | 1 | 43 | 12th |
| 2024 | 24 Hours of Le Mans - LMP2 Pro-Am | AF Corse | 1 | 1 | 0 | 0 | 1 | N/A | **1st** |
| 2024-25 | Asian Le Mans Series - GT | AF Corse | 4 | 0 | 0 | 0 | 0 | 9 | 19th |
| 2025 | FIA World Endurance Championship - Hypercar | Proton Competition | 8 | 0 | 0 | 0 | 0 | 1 | 27th |
| 2025 | IMSA SportsCar Championship - GTP | Proton Competition | 1 | 0 | 0 | 0 | 0 | 199 | 42nd |
| 2025 | IMSA SportsCar Championship - GTD Pro | Corvette Racing by Pratt Miller Motorsports | 3 | 0 | 0 | 0 | 1 | 860 | 18th |
| 2026 | FIA Formula 2 Championship | Van Amersfoort Racing | 20 | 0 | 0 | 1 | 0 | 15 | 19th* |
| 2026 | IMSA SportsCar Championship - GTD Pro | Corvette Racing by Pratt Miller Motorsports | 3 | 0 | 0 | 1 | 1 | 848 | 17th |
| 2026 | FIA World Endurance Championship - LMGT3 | TF Sport | 1 | 0 | 0 | 0 | 0 | 4 | 25th |
| 2026-27 | Asian Le Mans Series - LMP2 | AF Corse | | | | | | | |

† As he was a guest driver, Varrone was ineligible to score points.

=== Complete BRDC British Formula 3 Championship results ===
(key) (Races in bold indicate pole position) (Races in italics indicate fastest lap)

| Year | Team | 1 | 2 | 3 | 4 | 5 | 6 | 7 | 8 | 9 | 10 | 11 | 12 | 13 | 14 | 15 | 16 | 17 | 18 | 19 | 20 | 21 | 22 | 23 | 24 | Pos | Points |
|---|---|---|---|---|---|---|---|---|---|---|---|---|---|---|---|---|---|---|---|---|---|---|---|---|---|---|---|
| 2019 | Hillspeed | OUL; 1 | OUL; 2 | OUL; 3 | SNE; 1 | SNE; 2 | SNE; 3 | SIL1; 1; 17 | SIL1; 2; 4 | SIL1; 3; 14 | DON1; 1 | DON1; 2 | DON1; 3 | SPA; 1; 11 | SPA; 2; 1^{7} | SPA; 3; 8 | BRH; 1 | BRH; 2 | BRH; 3 | SIL2; 1; 13 | SIL2; 2; 2^{2} | SIL2; 3; 13 | DON2; 1 | DON2; 2 | DON2; 3 | 17th | 109 |
| 2020 | Chris Dittmann Racing | OUL; 1; 9 | OUL; 2; 5^{1} | OUL; 3 Ret | OUL; 4 Ret | DON1; 1 Ret | DON1; 2; 11^{8} | DON1; 3; 4 | BRH; 1 | BRH; 2 | BRH; 3 | BRH; 4 | DON2; 1 | DON2; 2 | DON2; 3 | SNE; 1 | SNE; 2 | SNE; 3 | SNE; 4 | DON3; 1 | DON3; 2 | DON3; 3 | SIL; 1 | SIL; 2 | SIL; 3 | 20th | 58 |

=== Complete 24 Hours of Le Mans results ===
| Year | Team | Co-Drivers | Car | Class | Laps | Pos. | Class Pos. |
|---|---|---|---|---|---|---|---|
| 2022 | (Italy) Iron Lynx | (Germany) Pierre Ehret (Germany) Christian Hook | Ferrari 488 GTE Evo | GTE Am | 324 | 53rd | 17th |
| 2023 | (United States) Corvette Racing | (Netherlands) Nicky Catsburg (United States) Ben Keating | Chevrolet Corvette C8.R | GTE; Am | 313 | 26th | **1st** |
| 2024 | (Italy) AF Corse | (United Kingdom) Ben Barnicoat (France) François Perrodo | Oreca 07-Gibson | LMP2 | 297 | 18th | 4th |
| 2024 | (Italy) AF Corse | (United Kingdom) Ben Barnicoat (France) François Perrodo | Oreca 07-Gibson | LMP2 Pro-Am | 297 | 18th | **1st** |
| 2025 | (Germany) Proton Competition | (Switzerland) Neel Jani (Chile) Nico Pino | Porsche 963 | Hypercar | 383 | 13th | 13th |

=== Complete European Le Mans Series results ===
(key) (Races in bold indicate pole position; races in italics indicate fastest lap)

| Year | Entrant | Class | Chassis | Engine | 1 | 2 | 3 | 4 | 5 | 6 | Rank | Points |
|---|---|---|---|---|---|---|---|---|---|---|---|---|
| 2022 | Rinaldi Racing | LMGTE | Ferrari 488 GTE Evo | Ferrari F154CB 3.9 L Turbo V8 | LEC; 1 | IMO; Ret | MNZ; 6 | CAT; 9 | SPA; 10 | ALG; 9 | 11th | 39 |
| 2024 | AF Corse | LMGT3 | Ferrari 296 GT3 | Ferrari F163CE 3.0 L Turbo V6 | CAT | LEC; 6 | IMO; 6 | SPA; 3 | MUG; 4 | ALG; Ret | 12th | 43 |

=== Complete FIA World Endurance Championship results ===
(key) (Races in bold indicate pole position; races in italics indicate fastest lap)

| Year | Entrant | Class | Chassis | Engine | 1 | 2 | 3 | 4 | 5 | 6 | 7 | 8 | Rank | Points |
|---|---|---|---|---|---|---|---|---|---|---|---|---|---|---|
| 2023 | Corvette Racing | LMGTE Am | Chevrolet Corvette C8.R | Chevrolet 5.5 L V8 | SEB; 1 | PRT; 1 | SPA; 2 | LMS; 1 | MNZ; 4 | FUJ; 2 | BHR; 7 | | 1st | 173 |
| 2025 | Proton Competition | Hypercar | Porsche 963 | Porsche 4.6 L Turbo V8 | QAT; 15 | IMO; 14 | SPA; Ret | LMS; 13 | SÃO; 10 | COA; 13 | FUJ; 12 | BHR; 17 | 27th | 1 |
| 2026 | TF Sport | LMGT3 | Chevrolet Corvette Z06 GT3.R | Chevrolet 5.5 L V8 | IMO | SPA | LMS | SÃO; 8 | COA | FUJ | CAT | MNZ | 25th | 4 |

=== Complete IMSA SportsCar Championship results ===
(key) (Races in bold indicate pole position; results in italics indicate fastest lap)

| Year | Team | Class | Make | Engine | 1 | 2 | 3 | 4 | 5 | 6 | 7 | 8 | 9 | 10 | 11 | Pos. | Points | Ref |
|---|---|---|---|---|---|---|---|---|---|---|---|---|---|---|---|---|---|---|
| 2022 | FastMD Racing | LMP3 | Ligier JS P320 | Nissan VK56DE 5.6 L V8 | DAY | SEB | MDO | WGL; 4 | MOS | ELK | PET | | | | | 29rd | 315 | |
| 2023 | AWA | LMP3 | Duqueine M30 – D08 | Nissan VK56DE 5.6 L V8 | DAY; 1 | SEB; 4 | WGL; 3 | MOS | ELK | IMS | PET; 6 | | | | | 13th | 882 | |
| 2024 | AWA | GTD | Chevrolet Corvette Z06 GT3.R | Chevrolet LT6.R 5.5 L V8 | DAY; 18 | SEB; 22 | LBH | LGA | | MOS | ELK | VIR | IMS | PET | | 56th | 251 | |
| 2024 | DragonSpeed | LMP2 | Oreca 07 | Gibson GK428 4.2 L V8 | | | | | WGL; 10 | | | | | | | 54th | 230 | |
| 2025 | Corvette Racing by Pratt Miller Motorsports | GTD Pro | Chevrolet Corvette Z06 GT3.R | Chevrolet LT6.R 5.5 L V8 | DAY; 7 | SEB; 9 | | LGA | DET | | MOS | ELK | VIR | IMS | PET; 2 | 18th | 860 | |
| 2025 | Proton Competition | GTP | Porsche 963 | Porsche 9RD 4.6 L V8 | | | LBH | | | WGL; 13 | | | | | | 42nd | 199 | |
| 2026 | Corvette Racing by Pratt Miller Motorsports | GTD Pro | Chevrolet Corvette Z06 GT3.R | Chevrolet LT6.R 5.5 L V8 | DAY; 4 | SEB; 3 | LGA | DET | WGL | MOS | ELK | VIR | IMS | PET; 12 | | 17th | 848 | |

=== Complete FIA Formula 2 Championship results ===
(key) (Races in bold indicate pole position) (Races in italics indicate fastest lap)

| Year | Entrant | 1 | 2 | 3 | 4 | 5 | 6 | 7 | 8 | 9 | 10 | 11 | 12 | 13 | 14 | 15 | 16 | 17 | 18 | 19 | 20 | 21 | 22 | 23 | 24 | 25 | 26 | 27 | 28 | 29 | DC | Points |
|---|---|---|---|---|---|---|---|---|---|---|---|---|---|---|---|---|---|---|---|---|---|---|---|---|---|---|---|---|---|---|---|---|
| 2026 | Van Amersfoort Racing | MEL; SPR; 21 | MEL; FEA; 17 | MIA; SPR; 4 | MIA; FEA; 13 | MTL; SPR; 16 | MTL; FEA; 6 | MON; SPR; 12 | MON; FEA; 20 | CAT; SPR; 12 | CAT; FEA; 13 | RBR; SPR; 12 | RBR; FEA; 16 | SIL; SPR; 18 | SIL; FEA; 13 | SPA; SPR; NC | SPA; FEA; 13 | HUN; SPR; 11 | HUN; FEA; 12 | MNZ; SPR; 11 | MNZ; FEA; 10 | MAD; SPR; Ret | MAD; FEA; 15 | BAK; SPR | BAK; FEA1 | BAK; FEA2 | LSL; SPR | LSL; FEA | YMC; SPR | YMC; FEA | 21st* | 15* |

* Season still in progress.
