= 2016 Formula Renault seasons =

2016 Formula Renault

Seasons
- ← 2015 2017 →

This article describes all the 2016 seasons of Formula Renault series across the world.

== Unofficial Formula Renault championships ==
=== 2016 Remus Formel Renault 2.0 Pokal season ===
The season was held between 13 May and 11 September and raced across Austria, Italy, Czech Republic and Germany. The races occur with other categories cars as part of the 2016 Austria Formula 3 Cup, this section presents only the Austrian Formula Renault 2.0L classification.

Position	1st	2nd	3rd	4th	5th	6th	7th	8th	9th	10th
Points	12.5	9	7.5	6	5	4	3	2	1	0.5

Pos	Driver	Team	(Austria) RBR 13-15 May		(Italy) IMO 27-29 May	(Czech Republic) MOS 17-19 Jun		(Germany) HOC 8-9 Jul		(Germany) LAU 15-16 Jul		(Austria) SAL 5-7 Aug		(Czech Republic) BRN 9-11 Sept		Pts
1	(Germany) Maggy Spahn	Team HES-Gerüstbau	2	DNS				1	DNS			DNS	1	3	3	49
2	(Austria) Josef Kandler	Josef Kandler	1	1		1	2									46.5
3	(Czech Republic) Petr Samek	Sape Motorsport				Ret	1							1	1	37.5
4	(Switzerland) Adrian Knapp	Adrian Knapp								1	1					25
5	(Germany) Hartmut Bertsch	Conrad Motorsport						2	1							21.5
6	(Austria) Josef Halwachs	F&F MenedzmentKft.												2	2	18

=== 2016 Formula Renault 2.0 Argentina season ===
All cars use Tito 02 chassis, all races were held in Argentina.

Position	1st	2nd	3rd	4th	5th	6th	7th	8th	9th	10th	Pole
Points	20	15	12	10	8	6	4	3	2	1	1

1 extra point in each race for regularly qualified drivers.

Pos	Driver	Team	TRE 19-20 Mar		SAN 7-8 May		OCA1 28-29 May	CON 4-5 Jun	RHO 18-19 Jun	OBE 2-3 Jul	BUA 30-31 Jul	PAM 24-25 Sept	RIC 8-9 Oct	ZON 22-23 Oct	GRN 5-6 Nov		OCA2 26-27 Nov		Points
1	(Argentina) Rudi Samuel Bundziak	Litoral Group	2	8	1		1								1	2	2	4	420
2	(Argentina) Emiliano Marino	Gabriel Werner Competición	11	1	4	14	4								3	3	3	3	411
3	(Argentina) Gastón Cabrera	LR Team		6	2	1	2								2	1	6	2	392
4	(Argentina) Ricardo Rolando	Litoral Group	6	14	16	2	16								4	4	1	1	350
5	(Argentina) Hernán Satler	Gabriel Werner Competición	17	3	5	13	5								17	16		8	283
6	(Argentina) Nicolás Dominici	Gabriel Werner Competición	1	2	6	17	6								12	10	8	5	281
7	(Argentina) Gabriel Gandulia	Croizet Racing	5	13	15	5	15								11	6	5	13	272
8	(Argentina) Martin Chialvo	JLS Motorsport													15	17	4		236
9	(Argentina) Santiago Rosso	JLS Motorsport	3			3									8	8	12	14	197
10	(Argentina) Nicolás Moscardini	Litoral Group	13	12	14	12	14								6	15	7	6	190
11	(Argentina) Juan Cruz Acosta Broda	Gabriel Werner Competición Junior																	187
12	(Argentina) José Hernán Palazzo	Litoral Group	4	4	17		17								5		18	15	181
13	(Argentina) Federico Barin	Gabriel Werner Competición Junior	16	5	7	16	7								19	5	15		165
14	(Argentina) Eduardo Moreno	BEXME Fórmula Renault	12		19	4	19								14	7	10	7	162
15	(Argentina) Exequiel Bastidas	Gabriel Werner Competición Junior	19	9	10	11	10										19	11	148
16	(Argentina) Mauro Cacciatore	Gabriel Werner Competición Junior	7		9	7	9								10	11	9	12	141
17	(Argentina) Gregorio Conta	Litoral Group	8		11	18	11								9	12	11		139
18	(Argentina) Marcos Zago	Castro Racing	9	10	12	19	12										16	17	66
19	(Argentina) Gastón Martínez	Martínez Competición	10	7	21	6	21												65
20	(Argentina) Matías Fernández	JLS Motorsport																16	64
21	(Argentina) Carlos Moreira Gibilisco	Lito Moreira Competición																	63
22	(Argentina) Guillermo Darío Morat	JLS Motorsport	15	11	20	10	20												47
23	(Argentina) Patricio Kissling	Croizet Racing			13	8	13												46
24	(Argentina) Franco Bosio	Castro Racing															13	10	31
25	(Argentina) Gastón Arriola	Croizet Racing																	16
26	(Argentina) Carlos Ruiz	Gabriel Werner Competición Junior													16	14			15
27	(Argentina) Nicolás Varrone	MS Racing Car													18	13	17	9	15
28	(Argentina) Franco Rossomanno	Gabriel Werner Competición													7				14
29	(Argentina) Baltazar Leguizamón	Werner Competición																	13
30	(Argentina) Lucas Rossomanno	Gabriel Werner Competición													20	9			12
31	(Argentina) Nicolas Cazal	JLS Motorsport	14	15		15													10
32	(Ecuador) José Enrico Brito Mendizabal	JLS Motorsport													13	18			8
33	(Argentina) Christian Abdala	Werner Competición	18																5
Pos	Driver	Team	TRE		SAN		OCA1	CON	RHO	OBE	BUA	PAM	RIC	ZON	GRN		OCA2		Points
