= 2018 V de V Challenge Monoplace =

The 2018 V de V Challenge Monoplace was a multi-event motor racing championship for open wheel, formula racing cars held across Europe. The championship features drivers competing mainly in 2 litre Formula Renault single seat race cars that conform to the technical regulations for the championship. The season began at Circuit de Barcelona-Catalunya on 23 March and will finish at Estoril on 4 November after seven double-header rounds.

Drivers compete in three classes depending on the type of car they drive. Those competing in the current Tatuus FR 2.0 2013 car, as well as the previous Barazi-Epsilon FR2.0–10 car, which are in use since 2010, are included in Class A. Older Formula Renault 2.0 machinery along with other cars such as Formula BMW and Formula Abarth encompass Class B. From 2018 on, Formula 4 cars built to FIA regulations are allowed to race in V de V Challenge Monoplace, being included in Class C.

== Teams and drivers ==
Entry list
Team	No.	Driver	Class		Rounds
(France) Formula Motorsport	1	(France) Erwin Creed	A		2
(France) Formula Motorsport	1	(France) Sébastien Perrot	A		4
(France) Formula Motorsport	2	(Switzerland) Walter Rykart	A	GD	1–5
(France) Formula Motorsport	3	(France) "Lebreton"	A	GD	1–5
(France) Formula Motorsport	4	(France) Michel Piroird	A	GD	1–5
(France) Formula Motorsport	5	(France) Xavier Benecchi	A	GD	2
(France) Formula Motorsport	6	(France) Vincent Iogna	A	GD	1, 3–4
(France) Formula Motorsport	7	(France) Nicolas Pironneau	A	GD	1
(France) Formula Motorsport	7	(France) Alexandre Bardinon	A		4
(France) Formula Motorsport	10	(France) Nicolas Melin	A	GD	2–5
(Poland) Inter Europol Competition	8	(Sweden) Edward Jonasson	A		1–5
(Poland) Inter Europol Competition	11	(Argentina) Nicolás Varrone	A		1–2
(Poland) Inter Europol Competition	20	(United States) Robert Siska	A	GD	3
(France) Zig Zag	14	(Monaco) Christian Carlesi Sorasio	A	GD	1
(France) Zig Zag	18	(Monaco) Nicolas Matile	A		1
(France) Zig Zag	54	(Madagascar) Jean-Christophe Peyre	A	GD	1
(France) Lamo Racing Car	14	(France) Victor Jabouille	A		5
(France) Lamo Racing Car	15	(France) Thierry Aimard	A	GD	1–4
(France) Lamo Racing Car	16	(France) Thierry Malhomme	A	GD	1–5
(France) Lamo Racing Car	17	(France) Grégory Segers	A		1–5
(France) Lamo Racing Car	41	(France) François Destandau	B	GD	1, 5
(France) Lamo Racing Car	53	(France) Grégory Choukroun	A	GD	1
(France) Lamo Racing Car	56	(France) Sebastien Geny-Gros	A	GD	3–4
(France) Lamo Racing Car	68	(France) Alain Bucher	A	GD	1–5
(Italy) TS Corse	25	(Argentina) Nicolás Varrone	A		3–5
(Italy) TS Corse	27	(United States) Howard Sklar	A	GD	1–4
(Italy) TS Corse	73	(Italy) Pietro Peccenini	A	GD	1–5
(France) CD Sport	30	(France) Augustin Collinot	A		4–5
(France) Lycée Pro D'Artagnan	34	(France) Daniel Harout	A	GD	1
(France) AGR Bleu Mercure	55	(France) Christophe Girardot	A	GD	1–5
(France) AGR Bleu Mercure	99	(France) Guillaume Veyrat	A	GD	1–2
(France) LSP Racing Team	87	(France) Baptiste Leonard	B		2–5

Icon	Class
A	Class A
B	Class B
C	Class C
GD	Gentleman Driver

== Race calendar and results ==
The calendar was published on 13 October 2017. In 2018, due to the race duration increasing from 20 to 30 minutes per race, each circuit will host two races instead of three.

Round		Circuit	Date	Pole position	Fastest lap	Winning driver	Winning team	Gentleman winner
1	R1	(Spain) Circuit de Barcelona-Catalunya, Montmeló	24 March	(Argentina) Nicolás Varrone	(Sweden) Edward Jonasson	(Italy) Pietro Peccenini	(Italy) TS Corse	(Italy) Pietro Peccenini
1	R2	(Spain) Circuit de Barcelona-Catalunya, Montmeló	24 March	(Argentina) Nicolás Varrone	(Argentina) Nicolás Varrone	(Argentina) Nicolás Varrone	(Poland) Inter Europol Competition	(France) Michel Piroird
2	R1	(France) Circuit de Nevers Magny-Cours, Magny-Cours	21 April	(France) Xavier Benecchi	(France) Erwin Creed	(France) Grégory Segers	(France) Lamo Racing Car	(France) "Lebreton"
2	R2	(France) Circuit de Nevers Magny-Cours, Magny-Cours	21 April	(Argentina) Nicolás Varrone	(Argentina) Nicolás Varrone	(Sweden) Edward Jonasson	(Poland) Inter Europol Competition	(France) Michel Piroird
3	R1	(France) Circuit Paul Ricard, Le Castellet	27 May	(Argentina) Nicolás Varrone	(Argentina) Nicolás Varrone	(Argentina) Nicolás Varrone	(Italy) TS Corse	(France) Nicolas Melin
3	R2	(France) Circuit Paul Ricard, Le Castellet	27 May	(Argentina) Nicolás Varrone	(France) Grégory Segers	(Argentina) Nicolás Varrone	(Italy) TS Corse	(France) Nicolas Melin
4	R1	(France) Dijon-Prenois, Prenois	1 July	(Argentina) Nicolás Varrone	(Argentina) Nicolás Varrone	(Argentina) Nicolás Varrone	(Italy) TS Corse	(Italy) Pietro Peccenini
4	R2	(France) Dijon-Prenois, Prenois	1 July	(Argentina) Nicolás Varrone	(France) Grégory Segers	(France) Grégory Segers	(France) Lamo Racing Car	(France) "Lebreton"
5	R1	(Spain) Circuito de Navarra, Los Arcos	2 September	(Argentina) Nicolás Varrone	(France) Grégory Segers	(France) Grégory Segers	(France) Lamo Racing Car	(France) Nicolas Melin
5	R2	(Spain) Circuito de Navarra, Los Arcos	2 September	(Argentina) Nicolás Varrone	(France) Grégory Segers	(France) Grégory Segers	(France) Lamo Racing Car	(France) Nicolas Melin
6	R1	(France) Circuit Bugatti, Le Mans	7 October	(Argentina) Nicolás Varrone	(Argentina) Nicolás Varrone	(Argentina) Nicolás Varrone	(Italy) TS Corse	(France) Nicolas Melin
6	R2	(France) Circuit Bugatti, Le Mans	7 October	(Argentina) Nicolás Varrone	(Sweden) Edward Jonasson	(Sweden) Edward Jonasson	(Poland) Inter Europol Competition	(Switzerland) Caryl Fritsche
7	R1	(Portugal) Autódromo Fernanda Pires da Silva, Estoril	4 November	(Argentina) Nicolás Varrone	(Argentina) Nicolás Varrone	(Argentina) Nicolás Varrone	(Italy) TS Corse	(France) Nicolas Melin
7	R2	(Portugal) Autódromo Fernanda Pires da Silva, Estoril	4 November	(Argentina) Nicolás Varrone	(Argentina) Nicolás Varrone	(France) Gregory Segers	(France) Lamo Racing Car	(Italy) Pietro Peccenini

== Standings ==
=== Points system ===
Points are awarded following a complex system. Drivers receive a set of points according to their overall position in each race, as well as an additional set of points according to their position within the class their car belongs to. No separated standings for classes A, B and C are issued. The points distribution is as follows:

Position		1st	2nd	3rd	4th	5th	6th	7th	8th	9th	10th	11th	12th	13th	14th	15th	16th	17th	18th	19th	20th	21st	22nd	23rd+
Points	Overall	25	23	21	20	19	18	17	16	15	14	13	12	11	10	9	8	7	6	5	4	3	2	1
Points	Per class (≥4 starters)	10	9	8	7	6	5	4	3	2	1													
Points	Per class (<4 starters)	3	2	1																				

The total number of points scored in each round is multiplied by a coefficient, depending on the round. Only the best 12 results are counted towards the overall standings, whereas all results are valid towards the Gentlemen Drivers standings.

Round	Coefficient
(France) Rounds 2–4, 6	x1
(Spain) Rounds 1, 5	x1.5
(Portugal) Round 7	x2
