= Olivier Couvreur =

Olivier Couvreur (born 23 May 1970) is a French champion driver in the Championnat de France Formula Renault 2.0 and the Eurocup Formula Renault.

Sporting positions
Preceded by Emmanuel Collard	Championnat de France Formule Renault champion 1991	Succeeded by Jean-Philippe Belloc
Preceded by Pedro de la Rosa	Eurocup Formula Renault 2.0; 1993	Succeeded by James Matthews
