= 2015 Formula Renault seasons =

2015 Formula Renault

Seasons
- ← 2014 2016 →

This article describes all the 2015 seasons of Formula Renault series across the world.

== Calendar ==
This table indicates the round number of each Formula Renault series according to weekend dates.

Formula; Renault	March		April				May					June				July				August					September				October
Formula; Renault	21–22	28–29	04–05	11–12	18–19	25–26	02–03	09–10	16–17	23–24	30–31	06–07	13–14	20–21	27–28	04–05	11–12	18–19	25–26	01–02	08–09	15–16	22–23	29–30	05–06	12–13	19–20	26–27	03–04	10–11	17–18	24–25
WSbR						1–2				3	4–5		6–7				8–9								10–11	12–13		14–15			16–17
Eurocup						1–3					4–5		6–7												8–10	11–12		13–14			15–17
NEC				1–2						3–4		5–7							8–9	10–11							12–13		14–16
Alps				1–2					3–4	5–7		8–9				10–12		13–14												15–16
Asia	1–2					3–4								5–6			7–8										9–10			11–12
French F4					1–3		4–6		7–9				10–12											13–15				16–18				19–21
1.6 Nordic								1–2			3–5	6–7					8–10						11–12			13		14–15
1.6 NEZ												1–2																3–4

== Other Formulas powered by Renault championships ==
=== 2015 Remus Formula Renault 2.0 Cup season ===
The season was held between 13 May and 11 September and raced across Austria, Germany, Italy and Czech Republic. The races occur with other categories as part of the Austria Formula 3 Cup, this section presents only the Austrian Formula Renault 2.0 classifications.

Position	1st	2nd	3rd	4th	5th	6th	7th	8th	9th	10th
Points	12.5	9	7.5	6	5	4	3	2	1	0.5

Pos	Driver	Team	(Italy) IMO 13-15 May	(Austria) RBR 27-29 May		(Germany) HOC 17-19 Jun		(Austria) SAL 8-9 Jul	(Czech Republic) MOS 15-16 Jul		(Germany) LAU 5-7 Aug		(Czech Republic) BRN 9-11 Sept		Pts
1	(Czech Republic) Jaroslav Pospisil	Krenek Motorsport		1	Ret				1	1			1	1	62.5
2	(Switzerland) Adrian Knapp	Adrian Knapp							2	2	1	1			43
3	(United States) Robert Siska	Inter Europol Competition		2	1								2	2	39.5
4	(Poland) Jakub Śmiechowski	Inter Europol Competition				1	2								21.5
=4	(Canada) David Richert	Inter Europol Competition				2	1								21.5
6	(Germany) Olaf Jahr	Olaf Jahr									2	2			18
7	(Germany) Hartmut Bertsch	Conrad Racing Sport				3	3								15
8	(Germany) Günter Weiss	Team Harder Motorsport		3											7.5

=== 2015 Formula Renault 2.0 Argentina season ===
All cars use Tito 02 chassis, all races were held in Argentina.

Position	1st	2nd	3rd	4th	5th	6th	7th	8th	9th	10th	Pole
Points	20	15	12	10	8	6	4	3	2	1	1

1 extra point in each race for regularly qualified drivers.

Pos	Driver	Team	JUN 28-29 Mar		RIC 3 May		OBE 16-17 May		RHO 6-7 Jun		RAF 27-28 Jun		SLU1 25-26 Jul		OCA1 15-16 Aug		PAM 26-27 Sept		GRN 17-18 Oct		SAN 7-8 Nov		OCA2 28-29 Nov		SLU2 19-20 Dec		Points
1	(Argentina) Martín Moggia	Litoral Group	1	19	1	2	1	2	1	2	2	1	3	1	3	1	2	2	1	1	?	4	3	2	1	1	389
2	(Argentina) Emiliano Marino	Gabriel Werner Competición	2	2	2	1	3	7	7	7	1	6	1	?	?	?	15	3	2	2	3	2	2	12	2	3	270
3	(Argentina) Marcelo Ciarrocchi	Litoral Group	10	1	3	5	2	1	4	2	15		?	?	1	2	3	6	12	18	1	1	1	6	4	2	261
4	(Argentina) Gastón Cabrera	LDR	5	5	5	3	14	11	1	9	3	5	2	?	?	?	9	10	3	13	2	10	19	1	6	4	187
5	(Argentina) Federico Cavagnero	JLS Motorsport							3	11	4	3	?	3	2	3	1	1	5	4	?	9	18	18			149
6	(Argentina) Nicolas Cazal	JLS Motorsport	17	7	14	7	8		17	18	14	2	?	2	?	?	19	4	4	6	?	16	4	4	7	8	127
7	(Argentina) Rudi Samuel Bundziak	Werner Competición	14	6	12	9	13	3	16	19	11	15	?	?	?	?	11	8	16	16	?	3	10	3	3	5	96
8	(Argentina) Hernán Satler	Werner Basalto	4	20	20	12	17	12	5			16	?	?	?	?	5	16	7	3	?	5	6	7	14	6	92
9	(Argentina) Nicolás Dominici	Gabriel Werner Competición	3	4	4	4	4	13	19	4	10	10	?	?	?	?											88
10	(Argentina) Ricardo Rolando	RNP Fórmulas	12	9	8	8	7	4	21	13	5	7	?	?	?	?	6	13	8	15	?		5	13	5	15	76
11	(Argentina) Nazareno Beguiristain	Litoral Group	20	8	17	13	6	9	15	3	9	14	?	?	?	?	13	11	6	5			13	5	16	11	66
12	(Chile) Maximiliano Matías Soto Zurita	JLS Fórmula	7	14	11	17			6	6	7	17	?	?	?	?	4	7		8	?		16	16	17	7	61
13	(Argentina) Agustín Lima Capitao	JLS Motorsport	6	3	9	6	5	6	11	5			?	?	?	?											52
14	(Argentina) Alex Conci	Croizet Racing	13	22	18	10	11		14	20	6	4	?	?	?	?	18	5	10	7	?	6	9	8			50
15	(Argentina) Gregorio Conta	Gabriel Werner Competición	9	15	16	14	9	5	13	17		8	?	?	?	?	16	9		11	?	14	14	17	11	14	37
16	(Argentina) Nicolas Antonio Salamone	JLS Fórmula		21	10	16	15	8	10	8	12	9	?	?	?	?	7	17					8	10			34
17	(Argentina) Santiago Mallo	Werner Basalto	21	16	7	11			22	16	16	13	?	?	?	?	20	18									20
18	(Argentina) Patricio Kissling	Croizet Racing	15	18	15	18	16	10	18		17	12	?	?	?	?	12	19	15	10	?	8	15	15	13	18	19
19	(Argentina) Carlos Moreira Gibilisco	Lito Moreira Competición			19	15	10	14	8	10	8	11	?	?	?	?	14	12									18
20	(Argentina) Federico Barin	Werner Competición											?	?	?	?			11	9	?	15	7	9	12	17	15
21	(Argentina) Nicolás Dapero	LDR	8	12	6								?	?	?	?											11
=21	(Chile) Lautaro Estrada	Croizet Racing							9	14			?	?	?	?	10	15			?	7					11
23	(Argentina) Mauro Cacciatore	Gabriel Werner Competición											?	?	?	?	17	14	14	12	?	12	12	11	18	9	9
=23	(Argentina) Gastón Martínez	Pampa Racing	16	17									?	?	?	?	8	20	13	17	?	13	17	14	10	16	9
25	(Argentina) Gabriel Gandulia	Croizet Racing											?	?	?	?									8	12	4
=25	(Argentina) Santiago Rosso	JLS Motorsport											?	?	?	?									9	10	4
=25	(Argentina) Pedro Sabella	M.S. Racing	11	13	13	19	12	15	12	12			?	?	?	?											4
28	(Argentina) Sami Fernandez Mendaña	JLS Fórmula											?	?	?	?			9	14							3
29	(Argentina) Julian Casagrande	RNP Fórmula							20	15			?	?	?	?											2
=29	(Brazil) Ariel Varella	Litoral Group Fórmulas	18	10									?	?	?	?											2
31	(Argentina) Maximiliano Battaglino	MR Racing									13	18	?	?	?	?											1
=31	(Argentina) Lucas Herasimchuk	Croizet Racing	19	11									?	?	?	?											1
=31	(Argentina) Guillermo Darío Morat	JLS Motorsport											?	?	?	?									15	13	1
=31	(Chile) Felipe Schmauk	Litoral Group											?	?	?	?					?	11	11	19			1
Pos	Driver	Team	JUN		RIC		OBE		RHO		RAF		SLU1		OCA1		PAM		GRN		SAN		OCA2		SLU2		Points
