= Florian Janits =

Austrian racing driver

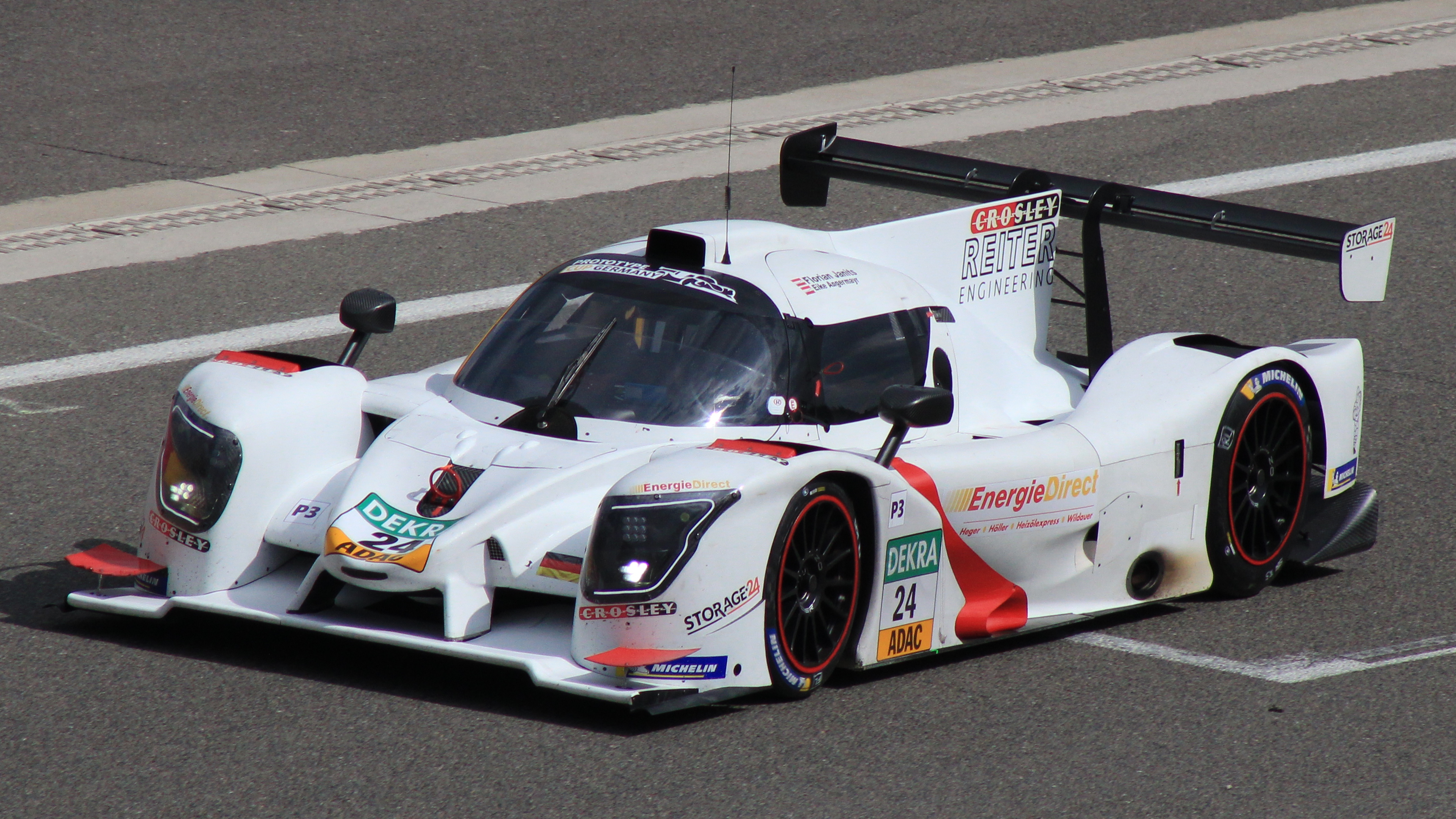
- Nationality: Austrian
- Born: 21 January 1998 (age 28) Steinberg-Dörfl, Austria

TCR International Series career
- Debut season: 2016
- Current team: Liqui Moly Team Engstler
- Car number: 45
- Starts: 2

Previous series
- 2015 2013-14 2007-13: ADAC Formula 4 Formula Renault 1.6 NEC; Karting

Florian Janits (born 21 January 1998) is an Austrian racing driver currently competing in the TCR International Series. Having previously competed in the ADAC Formula 4 & Formula Renault 1.6 NEC amongst others.

== Racing career ==
Janits began his career in 2007 in Karting, he raced there for many seasons up until 2013. In 2013, he switched to the Formula Renault 1.6 NEC championship, he raced there for two seasons and finished third in the championship in 2014, taking five podiums, two pole positions and one victory. He switched to the ADAC Formula 4 championship for 2015, finishing within the top-16 in most of the races he took part in.

In May 2016, it was announced that Janits would race in the TCR International Series, driving a Volkswagen Golf GTI TCR for Liqui Moly Team Engstler.

== Racing record ==
=== Career Summary ===
Season	Series	Team	Races	Wins	Poles	F/Laps	Podiums	Points	Position
2013	Formula Renault 1.6 NEC	Walter Lechner Racing	2	0	0	0	0	25	18th
2014	Formula Renault 1.6 NEC	Lechner Racing School	13	2	1	0	6	250	**3rd**
2015	ADAC Formula 4 Championship	Lechner Racing	12	0	0	0	0	0	37th
2016	TCR International Series	Liqui Moly Team Engstler	2	0	0	0	0	3	31st
2018	GT4 European Series	Lechner Racing	12	0	0	0	1	24	19th
2020	ADAC GT4 Germany	True Racing	12	2	0	1	5	148	4th
2021	DTM Trophy	True Racing by Reiter Engineering	6	0	0	0	0	31	12th
2022	Prototype Cup Germany	Reiter Engineering	2	0	1	0	1	16	18th
2022-23	Porsche Sprint Challenge Middle East	DHL Team	4	0	0	0	2	92	**3rd**
2023	Porsche Sprint Challenge Central Europe - GT3 Cup	OJ Racing							

=== Complete Formula Renault 1.6 NEC results ===
(key) (Races in bold indicate pole position) (Races in italics indicate fastest lap)

Year	Team	1	2	3	4	5	6	7	8	9	10	11	12	13	14	15	DC	Points
2013	Walter Lechner Racing	ZAN1; 1	ZAN1; 2	ASS1; 1	ASS1; 2	ZOL; 1	ZOL; 2	NÜR; 1	NÜR; 2	ZAN2; 1; 7	ZAN2; 2; 10	ASS2; 1	ASS2; 2				18th	25
2014	Lechner Racing School	ZAN1; 1; 4	ZAN1; 2; 8	SPA1; 1; 4	SPA1; 2; 12	NÜR; 1; 9	NÜR; 2; 7	ASS; 1; 5	ASS; 2; 3	ZOL; 1; 1	ZOL; 2; 4	**SPA2**; **1**; 3	SPA2; 2; 2	ZAN2; 1; 4	ZAN2; 2; 3	ZAN2; 3; 1	3rd	250

=== Complete ADAC Formula 4 Championship results ===
(key) (Races in bold indicate pole position) (Races in italics indicate fastest lap)

Year	Team	1	2	3	4	5	6	7	8	9	10	11	12	13	14	15	16	17	18	19	20	21	22	23	24	DC	Points
2015	Lechner Racing	OSC; 1; 15	OSC; 2; 16	OSC; 3; 16	RBR; 1; 21	RBR; 2; 15	RBR; 3; 31	SPA; 1; 12	SPA; 2; 13	SPA; 3; 33	LAU; 1	LAU; 2	LAU; 3	NÜR; 1	NÜR; 2	NÜR; 3	SAC; 1	SAC; 2	SAC; 3	OSC; 1; 25	OSC; 2; 16	OSC; 3; 25	HOC; 1	HOC; 2	HOC; 3	37th	0

=== Complete TCR International Series results ===
(key) (Races in bold indicate pole position) (Races in italics indicate fastest lap)

Year	Team	Car	1	2	3	4	5	6	7	8	9	10	11	12	13	14	15	16	17	18	19	20	21	22	DC	Points
2016	Liqui Moly Team Engstler	Volkswagen Golf GTI TCR	BHR; 1	BHR; 2	POR; 1	POR; 2	BEL; 1	BEL; 2	ITA; 1	ITA; 2	AUT; 1; 9	AUT; 2; 10	GER; 1	GER; 2	RUS; 1	RUS; 2	THA; 1	THA; 2	SIN; 1	SIN; 2	MYS; 1	MYS; 2	MAC; 1	MAC; 2	31st	3
