= Autódromo Parque Ciudad de General Roca =

- No.3 Circuit (2006–present)
- Location: General Roca, Río Negro, Argentina
- Coordinates: 39°4′33″S 67°34′47″W
- Opened: 19 September 1983; 43 years ago
- Major events: Current: TC2000 (1983–1989, 1991–1995, 1997–1999, 2002–2013, 2015–2017, 2019, 2025–present); Top Race V6 (1997, 2002, 2005–2008, 2017, 2026); Former: Turismo Nacional (1986–1990, 1992–1993, 1995, 1997–1999, 2010–2011)

No.3 Circuit (2006–present)
- Length: 3.625 km (2.252 mi)
- Turns: 13
- Race lap record: 1:32.378 ( (Argentina) José María López, Ford Focus II, 2012, Súper TC2000)

No.2 Circuit (1992–2005)
- Length: 2.600 km (1.616 mi)
- Turns: 12
- Race lap record: 1:08.176 ( (Argentina) Daniel Cingolani, Ford Escort VI, 1997, TC2000)

No.1 Circuit (1983–1991)
- Length: 2.012 km (1.250 mi)
- Turns: 5

Autódromo Parque Ciudad de General Roca is a 3.625 km (2.252 mi) motorsports circuit located in Rio Negro, Argentina. It has hosted events in the TC2000 and Formula Renault Argentina series. The track has 13 corners. The circuit was opened in September 1983.

== Lap records ==
As of June 2012, the fastest official race lap records at the Autódromo Parque Ciudad de General Roca are listed as:

Category	Time	Driver	Vehicle	Event
No.3 Circuit (2006–present): 3.625 km (2.252 mi)
Súper TC2000	1:32.378	José María López	Ford Focus II	2012 General Roca Súper TC2000 round
Formula Renault 2.0	1:33.673	Gianfranco Collino	Tito F4-A	2011 General Roca Formula Renault Argentina round
No.2 Circuit (1992–2005): 2.600 km (1.616 mi)
TC2000	1:08.176	Daniel Cingolani	Ford Escort VI	1997 General Roca TC2000 round
