= 2024 Fórmula Nacional Argentina =

The 2024 Fórmula Nacional Argentina was a multi-event Formula Renault 2.0 open-wheel single seater motor racing championship. The championship featured a mix of professional and amateur drivers. This championship was held under the Formula Renault Argentina moniker from 1980. This was the third season held under the Fórmula Nacional Argentina moniker.

The season started at Autódromo Oscar y Juan Gálvez on 13 April, and was held over 16 races spanning eight weekends.

Santiago Chiarello won the Drivers' Championship during the penultimate weekend, while his team, MG Competición won the Teams' Championship at the final race of the season.

== Teams and drivers ==
While the championship was a spec-chassis series until 2023, the 2024 season saw the teams able to choose to run either a Tito-built chassis or a Crespi Tulia 25 chassis, both running a 1600cc Renault engine.

Team	No.	Driver	Rounds
MR Racing	4	(Argentina) Santiago Cueto	1–2, 7
MR Racing	27	(Argentina) Tomás Fernández	3, 5–8
MR Racing	46	(Argentina) Bautista Faccioli	3, 5–8
MR Racing	59	(Argentina) Santiago López	8
MR Racing	81	(Argentina) Heber Lamboglia	1–6
MR Racing	83	(Uruguay) Kevin Ferreyra	All
MR Racing	33	(Argentina) Valentina Funes	2–8
Perotti Competición	33	(Argentina) Valentina Funes	1
JD Sport Team	5	(Argentina) Damián Sabbioni	3–5, 7–8
JD Sport Team	96	(Argentina) Leonardo Roberi	6
MG Competición	9	(Argentina) Santiago Chiarello	All
MG Competición	22	(Argentina) Ayrton Gardoqui	All
MG Competición	317	(Argentina) Lautaro Campione	8
Della Santina Motorsport	10	(Argentina) Bautista della Santina	8
Jorge Typek Competición	12	(Argentina) Andrés Brion	1, 3
Jorge Typek Competición	14	(Argentina) Juan Cruz Farías	3–7
Jorge Typek Competición	53	(Argentina) Jorge Mario Typek	6
Jorge Typek Competición	62	(Argentina) Emiliano Stang	6
Jorge Typek Competición	65	(Argentina) Emanuel Casella	8
Jorge Typek Competición	77	(Argentina) Julio Velázquez	8
Jorge Typek Competición	122	(Argentina) Lucas Martínez	1
CB Racing	17	(Peru) Daniella Ore	All
CB Racing	54	(Argentina) Julián Ramos	3–8
Broggi Sport	23	(Argentina) José Broggi	8
DC Competition	55	(Argentina) Francisco Guinda	8
DC Competition	72	(Argentina) Gerónimo Casale	7–8
Marinucci Competición	66	(Argentina) Ramiro Marinucci	6–8
Alessandrini Competición	67	(Argentina) Francisco Rohwein	1
RDQ Competition	86	(Argentina) Benjamín Squaglia	7–8
SV Fórmula	90	(Argentina) Alejandro Guttlein	2–4
SV Fórmula	107	(Argentina) Lucía González	8
SV Fórmula	110	(Argentina) Gastón Bernatta	7
Buenos Aires Racing	95	(Argentina) Santino Roberi	All
Domínguez Competition	99	(Argentina) Joaquín Domínguez	2–8
Porcelli Racing	111	(Argentina) Málek Fara	2–3
Basco Racing Team	113	(Argentina) Facundo Gutiérrez	5–8

- Agustín Callieri was announced to be competing with his eponymous Callieri Sport team, but did not enter any rounds.
- Nini Motorsport planned to enter the championship, but did not field any drivers at any of the events.

== Race calendar ==
The dates for the 2024 season were announced on 19 January 2024, with the exact circuits announced in the days leading up to the events. The championship downsized from twelve to eight events.

Round		Circuit	Date	Support bill	Map of circuit locations
1	R1	(Argentina) Autódromo Oscar y Juan Gálvez, Buenos Aires (Circuit No. 8)	13 April	Turismo Competición 2000; Campeonato Argentino de Superbike	2024 Fórmula Nacional Argentina is located in Argentina
1	R2	(Argentina) Autódromo Oscar y Juan Gálvez, Buenos Aires (Circuit No. 8)	14 April	Turismo Competición 2000; Campeonato Argentino de Superbike	2024 Fórmula Nacional Argentina is located in Argentina
2	R1	(Argentina) Autódromo Oscar y Juan Gálvez, Buenos Aires (Circuit No. 8)	11 May	Top Race V6; Top Race Series	2024 Fórmula Nacional Argentina is located in Argentina
2	R2	(Argentina) Autódromo Oscar y Juan Gálvez, Buenos Aires (Circuit No. 8)	12 May	Top Race V6; Top Race Series	2024 Fórmula Nacional Argentina is located in Argentina
3	R1	(Argentina) Autódromo Oscar y Juan Gálvez, Buenos Aires (Circuit No. 6)	1 June	Top Race V6; Top Race Series	2024 Fórmula Nacional Argentina is located in Argentina
3	R2	(Argentina) Autódromo Oscar y Juan Gálvez, Buenos Aires (Circuit No. 6)	2 June	Top Race V6; Top Race Series	2024 Fórmula Nacional Argentina is located in Argentina
4	R1	(Argentina) Autódromo Oscar y Juan Gálvez, Buenos Aires (Circuit No. 8)	13 July	Top Race V6; Top Race Series	2024 Fórmula Nacional Argentina is located in Argentina
4	R2	(Argentina) Autódromo Oscar y Juan Gálvez, Buenos Aires (Circuit No. 8)	14 July	Top Race V6; Top Race Series	2024 Fórmula Nacional Argentina is located in Argentina
5	R1	(Argentina) Autódromo Parque Ciudad de Río Cuarto, Río Cuarto (Medium Circuit)	10 August	Turismo Competición 2000; Fiat Competizione	2024 Fórmula Nacional Argentina is located in Argentina
5	R2	(Argentina) Autódromo Parque Ciudad de Río Cuarto, Río Cuarto (Medium Circuit)	11 August	Turismo Competición 2000; Fiat Competizione	2024 Fórmula Nacional Argentina is located in Argentina
6	R1	(Argentina) Autódromo de Concepción del Uruguay, Concepción del Uruguay (Full Circuit)	7 September	Top Race V6; Top Race Series	2024 Fórmula Nacional Argentina is located in Argentina
6	R2	(Argentina) Autódromo de Concepción del Uruguay, Concepción del Uruguay (Full Circuit)	8 September	Top Race V6; Top Race Series	2024 Fórmula Nacional Argentina is located in Argentina
7	R1	(Argentina) Autódromo Oscar y Juan Gálvez, Buenos Aires (Circuit No. 9)	5 October	TCR South America Touring Car Championship; Stock Car Pro Series	2024 Fórmula Nacional Argentina is located in Argentina
7	R2	(Argentina) Autódromo Oscar y Juan Gálvez, Buenos Aires (Circuit No. 9)	6 October	TCR South America Touring Car Championship; Stock Car Pro Series	2024 Fórmula Nacional Argentina is located in Argentina
8	R1	(Argentina) Autódromo Oscar Cabalén, Alta Gracia (Circuit No. 3)	23 November	Turismo Competición 2000	2024 Fórmula Nacional Argentina is located in Argentina
8	R2	(Argentina) Autódromo Oscar Cabalén, Alta Gracia (Circuit No. 3)	24 November	Turismo Competición 2000	2024 Fórmula Nacional Argentina is located in Argentina

== Race results ==
Round		Circuit	Pole position	Fastest lap	Winning driver	Winning team
1	R1	(Argentina) Autódromo Oscar y Juan Gálvez (Circuit No. 8)		(Argentina) Santiago Chiarello	(Argentina) Santiago Chiarello	MG Competición
1	R2	(Argentina) Autódromo Oscar y Juan Gálvez (Circuit No. 8)	(Argentina) Santiago Chiarello	(Argentina) Santiago Chiarello	(Argentina) Santiago Chiarello	MG Competición
2	R1	(Argentina) Autódromo Oscar y Juan Gálvez (Circuit No. 8)		(Peru) Daniella Ore	(Argentina) Santiago Chiarello	MG Competición
2	R2	(Argentina) Autódromo Oscar y Juan Gálvez (Circuit No. 8)	(Argentina) Santiago Chiarello	(Uruguay) Kevin Ferreyra	(Uruguay) Kevin Ferreyra	MR Racing
3	R1	(Argentina) Autódromo Oscar y Juan Gálvez (Circuit No. 6)		(Peru) Daniella Ore	(Peru) Daniella Ore	GD Sport
3	R2	(Argentina) Autódromo Oscar y Juan Gálvez (Circuit No. 6)	(Argentina) Santiago Chiarello	(Argentina) Julián Ramos	(Argentina) Santiago Chiarello	MG Competición
4	R1	(Argentina) Autódromo Oscar y Juan Gálvez (Circuit No. 8)		(Argentina) Julián Ramos	(Argentina) Julián Ramos	GD Sport
4	R2	(Argentina) Autódromo Oscar y Juan Gálvez (Circuit No. 8)	(Argentina) Santiago Chiarello	(Argentina) Julián Ramos	(Argentina) Santiago Chiarello	MG Competición
5	R1	(Argentina) Autódromo Parque Ciudad de Río Cuarto (Medium Circuit)		(Argentina) Santiago Chiarello	(Argentina) Julián Ramos	GD Sport
5	R2	(Argentina) Autódromo Parque Ciudad de Río Cuarto (Medium Circuit)	(Argentina) Santiago Chiarello	(Argentina) Julián Ramos	(Argentina) Julián Ramos	GD Sport
6	R1	(Argentina) Autódromo de Concepción del Uruguay (Full Circuit)		(Uruguay) Kevin Ferreyra	(Argentina) Emiliano Stang	Jorge Typek Competición
6	R2	(Argentina) Autódromo de Concepción del Uruguay (Full Circuit)	(Argentina) Julián Ramos	(Argentina) Emiliano Stang	(Argentina) Julián Ramos	GD Sport
7	R1	(Argentina) Autódromo Oscar y Juan Gálvez (Circuit No. 9)		(Argentina) Julián Ramos	(Argentina) Tomás Fernández	MR Racing
7	R2	(Argentina) Autódromo Oscar y Juan Gálvez (Circuit No. 9)	(Argentina) Julián Ramos	(Uruguay) Kevin Ferreyra	(Argentina) Julián Ramos	GD Sport
8	R1	(Argentina) Autódromo Oscar Cabalén (Circuit No. 3)		(Argentina) Santiago López	(Argentina) Santiago Chiarello	MG Competición
8	R2	(Argentina) Autódromo Oscar Cabalén (Circuit No. 3)	(Argentina) Lautaro Campione	(Argentina) Santiago Chiarello	(Argentina) Santiago Chiarello	MG Competición

== Season report ==
=== First half ===
The 2024 Fórmula Nacional Argentina season commenced with four rounds at the Autódromo Oscar y Juan Gálvez, and Santiago Chiarello of MG Competición secured pole position during the opening qualifying session. He led every lap of the first race, achieving his second victory in the series, with Andrés Brion from Jorge Typek Competición and Kevin Ferreyra of MR Racing completing the podium. The second race took place in wet conditions, but Chiarello maintained his dominance despite the challenging track, finishing first once more. The podium lineup remained unchanged from race one, leaving Chiarello with an early championship advantage after the inaugural weekend.

Chiarello secured pole position once more for the season’s second round. He extended his winning streak in the first race, but only after GD Sport’s Daniella Ore was penalized for a false start and dropped to second ahead of Chiarello’s teammate Ayrton Gardoqui. The second race saw Ore briefly overtake Chiarello for the lead before a collision between the two resulted in her retirement and Chiarello’s exclusion from the race. This allowed MR Racing’s Kevin Ferreyra to claim his maiden victory, finishing ahead of SV Formula’s Alejandro Guttlein and Domínguez Competición’s Joaquín Domínguez. Despite the incident, Chiarello maintained a 23-point championship lead over Ferreyra.

Jorge Typek Competición’s Andrés Brion set the fastest time in qualifying for round three but was disqualified, awarding Chiarello his third pole position in a row. The first race saw Ore achieve a great victory, starting from 11th and overtaking the field to secure the win. She finished ahead of pole-sitter Chiarello and Brion, becoming the first woman to claim a victory in series history. In race two, Chiarello responded with a win, finishing ahead of Brion and GD Sport’s newcomer Julián Ramos, extending his championship lead to 47 points over Ore in second. Both race results underwent scrutiny for potential technical violations, but no post-race penalties were issued.

Chiarello remained unbeaten in qualifying, securing another pole position in the fourth round of the championship. The first race saw Ramos claim victory, triumphing in only his third start. Points leader Chiarello finished second, followed by MR Racing’s Bautista Faccioli in third. Chiarello’s closest challenger Ore was excluded from the race, so he extended his lead. In the second race, Chiarello returned to the top step of the podium, solidifying his status as the most successful driver in the championship's history at the Buenos Aires track. Ramos took second place, while Ore completed the podium. This result increased Chiarello's lead in the standings to 79 points.

=== Second half ===
The second half of the season featured a new venue in the Autódromo Parque Ciudad de Río Cuarto, though the top spot in qualifying remained unchanged as Chiarello secured pole position once again. In the first race, Ramos started seventh and climbed through the field to secure his second victory of the season. Chiarello finished second and SV Fórmula’s Facundo Gutiérrez took third in his return to the series. Race two opened with a spin by poleman Chiarello, allowing Ramos to take the lead. He successfully defended his position to claim another win. Chiarello recovered to finish second, ahead of Ferreyra. Ore failed to secure a podium finish and was now 93 points behind Chiarello.

Round six of the championship, held at the Autódromo de Concepción del Uruguay, saw Ramos put an end to Chiarello’s streak of pole positions. Still, he was unable to start the first race due to a gearbox failure. The race was won by 2024 runner-up Emiliano Stang, who made a one-off appearance with Jorge Typek Competición. Reverse-grid pole sitter Ferreyra secured second place, with Faccioli completing the podium in third. Ramos recovered in race two, delivering a lights-to-flag victory ahead of Chiarello and Stang. With Ore excluded from race one and finishing fifth in race two, Chiarello extended his lead to 113 points, while Ramos closed up to within two points of the Peruvian.

The penultimate round of the year saw the series return to Buenos Aires, where Ramos took his second pole position. The first race saw MR Racing driver Tomás Fernández take his maiden win. He benefitted by a collision between Ramos and Jorge Typek Competición’s Juan Cruz Farías that dropped Ramos down to last place. Still, Ramos was able to put on a brilliant comeback drive to recover to third behind championship leader Chiarello. Race two saw pole sitter Ramos obtain a lights-to-flag victory, leading the field throughout two safety car interruptions. Ore came second, but with Chiarello third, no one could deny him the championship title.

The Autódromo Oscar Cabalén hosted the season finale, and MG Competición driver Lautaro Campione claimed pole position on his series debut. The first race began with Ore in the lead, but after a collision with Gutiérrez, she was judged to have performed a dangerous maneuver and was excluded from the race. That left champion-elect Chiarello to claim his sixth win ahead of Gardoqui and Campione. The final race of the year proved to be another demonstration of Chiarello’s pace as he led home Jorge Typek Competición's debutant Julio Velázquez and Faccioli, taking another victory to also secure the Teams’ Championship for his team in the process.

Fórmula Nacional Argentina’s 2024 season began with political turmoil off-track when the two major Argentine motorsport governing bodies in Argentina, ACTC and ACA, announced a split. That led to the creation of the rival Fórmula 2 Argentina series and the curious sight of none of the teams that competed in 2023 entering the 2024 season. Still, the series enjoyed high interest, climaxing in a record 23 cars entering the season finale. On track, Chiarello convincingly beat any opposition, taking seven wins and seven further podiums on his way to the title. Still, Ramos was able to hold his own against him on multiple occasions, but as he did not enter the first two rounds, Chiarello already had a comfortable lead when Ramos started beating him.

== Championship standings ==
=== Scoring system ===
Every driver taking part in qualifying or in one of the two races of a weekend and setting a time was awarded five points.

==== Qualifying points ====
Each qualifying session awarded one point to the fastest driver. Afterwards, the five fastest drivers took part in the "super qualifying" session, each setting one lap to set the top five positions. These five drivers were also awarded points, provided they set a lap:

Position in qualifying / **1st**; Points / 1	Position in super qualifying / **1st** / **2nd** / **3rd** / **4th** / **5th**; Points / 5 / 4 / 3 / 2 / 1

==== Race points ====
Position	**1st**	**2nd**	**3rd**	**4th**	**5th**	**6th**	**7th**	**8th**	**9th**	**10th**	**11th**	**12th**	**13th**	**14th**	**15th**
Points	25	20	17	15	13	11	9	8	7	6	5	4	3	2	1

The two worst weekends points-wise of each driver were dropped. Rounds where a driver was excluded from a race were not allowed to be dropped.

=== Drivers' Championship ===
Pos	Driver	BUE1 (Argentina)		BUE2 (Argentina)		BUE3 (Argentina)		BUE4 (Argentina)		RCU (Argentina)		CDU (Argentina)		BUE5 (Argentina)		COR (Argentina)		Pts
Pos	Driver	R1	R2	R1	R2	R1	R2	R1	R2	R1	R2	R1	R2	R1	R2	R1	R2	Pts
1	(Argentina) Santiago Chiarello	1	**1***^{1}	1	**EX**^{1}	2	**1***^{1}	2	**1***^{1}	2	**2***^{1}	(6)	(2*^{2})	(2)	(3*^{3})	1	1^{2}	323
2	(Argentina) Julián Ramos					4	3	1	2^{2}	1	1^{2}	Ret	**1**^{1}	3	**1**^{1}	Ret	Ret	242
3	(Peru) Daniella Ore	(4)	(9†^{3})	(2)	(Ret*^{2})	1	4	EX	3^{4}	4	4^{4}	EX	5^{3}	8	2^{2}	EX	5^{3}	190
4	(Uruguay) Kevin Ferreyra	3	3^{4}	Ret	1^{4}	(Ret)	(12^{3})	6	6	9	3	2	6	(Ret)	(Ret^{5})	7	Ret	182
5	(Argentina) Bautista Faccioli					Ret	8	3	DNS	EX	8	3	11	4	4	6	2^{4}	159
6	(Argentina) Ayrton Gardoqui	5	4	3	EX^{5}	(Ret)	(DNS^{2})	Ret	5^{5}	8	11^{3}	(Ret)	(7)	EX	13†^{4}	2	6	147
7	(Argentina) Santino Roberi	Ret	8	7	6	5	10	(Ret)	(9)	(Ret)	(12†)	8	9	5	14†	9	8	126
8	(Argentina) Valentina Funes	(WD)	(WD)	6	5	6	DNS	DNS	8	5	9	4	Ret	(9)	(Ret)	8	Ret	120
9	(Argentina) Joaquín Domínguez			5	3	EX	7	Ret	10	7	7	5	Ret	Ret	11	(WD)	(WD)	110
10	(Argentina) Tomás Fernández					DNS	6^{4}			WD	WD	12	4^{4}	1	5	4	Ret	107
11	(Argentina) Heber Lamboglia	6	5^{5}	Ret	Ret	DNS	5	Ret	4^{3}	Ret	6	Ret	14					99
12	(Argentina) Andrés Brion	2	2^{2}			3	2											91
13	(Argentina) Facundo Gutiérrez									3	5	11	8	6	7	Ret	10	89
14	(Argentina) Juan Cruz Farías					Ret	DNS	5	7	6	10	9	10	11	12			85
15	(Argentina) Alejandro Guttlein			4	2	DNS	9	4	Ret									72
16	(Argentina) Santiago Cueto	7	7	8†	Ret									10	10			53
17	(Argentina) Damián Sabbioni					DNS	11	Ret	Ret	WD	WD			7	8	14	9	51
18	(Argentina) Emiliano Stang											1	3					47
19	(Argentina) Ramiro Marinucci											10	12	Ret	6	EX	Ret	36
20	(Argentina) Julio Velázquez															5	3	35
21	(Argentina) Benjamín Squaglia													Ret	Ret	10	4	31
22	(Argentina) Lautaro Campione															3	**Ret***^{1}	28
23	(Argentina) Francisco Rohwein	8†	6															24
24	(Argentina) Málek Fara			DNS	4^{3}	WD	WD											23
25	(Argentina) Gerónimo Casale													EX	9	15	Ret	18
=26	(Argentina) Jorge Mario Typek											7	13					17
=26	(Argentina) Francisco Guinda															13	7	17
28	(Argentina) Santiago López															11	13	13
29	(Argentina) Emanuel Casella															12	12	13
30	(Argentina) José Broggi															Ret	11	10
31	(Argentina) Lucas Martínez	DNS	DNS															5
32	(Argentina) Lucía González															DNS	DNS	5
—	(Argentina) Leonardo Roberi											WD	WD					0
—	(Argentina) Gastón Bernatta													WD	WD			0
—	(Argentina) Bautista della Santina															WD	WD	0
Pos	Driver	R1	R2	R1	R2	R1	R2	R1	R2	R1	R2	R1	R2	R1	R2	R1	R2	Pts
Pos	Driver	BUE1 (Argentina)		BUE2 (Argentina)		BUE3 (Argentina)		BUE4 (Argentina)		RCU (Argentina)		CDU (Argentina)		BUE5 (Argentina)		COR (Argentina)		Pts

Colour	Result
Gold	Winner
Silver	Second place
Bronze	Third place
Green	Points finish
Blue	Non-points finish
Blue	Non-classified finish (NC)
Purple	Retired (Ret)
Red	Did not qualify (DNQ)
Red	Did not pre-qualify (DNPQ)
Black	Disqualified (DSQ)
White	Did not start (DNS)
White	Withdrew (WD)
White	Race cancelled (C)
Blank	Did not practice (DNP)
Blank	Did not arrive (DNA)
Blank	Excluded (EX)

**Bold** – Pole

Italics – Fastest Lap

* – fastest in qualifying

^{1 2 3 4 5} – super qualifying positions

=== Teams' Championship ===
Pos	Team	Pts
1	MG Competición	556
2	MR Racing	519
3	CB Racing	457
4	Jorge Typek Competición	213
5	SV Fórmula	173
6	Buenos Aires Racing	133
7	Domínguez Competition	110
8	JD Sport Team	56
9	Marinucci Competición	36
10	DC Competition	35
11	RDQ Competition	31
12	Porcelli Racing	28
13	Alessandrini Competición	24
14	Broggi Sport	10
—	Perotti Competición	0
—	Della Santina Motorsport	0
