= 2014 Formula Renault seasons =

2014 Formula Renault

Seasons
- ← 2013 2015 →

This article describes all the 2014 seasons of Formula Renault series across the world.

== Calendar ==
This table indicates the round number of each Formula Renault series according to weekend dates. The dark note indicates Winter Series dates.

Formula; Renault	March		April				May					June				July				August					September				October				November					December
Formula; Renault	22-23	29-30	5–6	12–13	19–21	26–27	3–4	9–11	17–18	24–25	31-1	7–8	14–15	21–22	28–29	5–6	12–13	19–20	25–27	2–3	9–10	16–17	23–24	30-31	6–7	13–14	20–21	27–28	4–5	11–12	18–19	25–26	1–2	8–9	15–16	22–23	29–30	6–7	13–14
WSbR				1–2		3–4				5	6–7				8–9		10–11									12–13		14–15			16–17
Eurocup						1–2					3–4				5–6		7–8									9–10		11–12			13–14
Alps			1–2					3–4		5–6		7–8				9–10									11–12				13–14
NEC				1–2						3–4			5–7						8–9	10–11				12–14			15–17
Protyre			1-3								4–6								7–8					9-11			12-13	14–15
Asia	1–2							3–5					6–7														8–9				9–12								13–14
French F4						1–3		3–6									7–9								10–12			13–15			16–18	19–21
1.6 NEC					1-2						3-4						5-6			7-8				9-10					11-12		13-15
1.6 Nordic							1-2		3-5								6-9				10-11		12-13		14-15		16-17

== Formula Renault 1.6L ==
=== 2014 Formula Renault 1.6 NEC season ===
- Point system : 30, 24, 20, 17, 16, 15, 14, 13, 12, 11, 10, 9, 8, 7, 6, 5, 4, 3, 2, 1 for 20th. No points for Fastest lap or Pole position.
- Round at Nürburgring was non-championship.

Pos	No.	Driver	Team	(Netherlands) Zandvoort 21 April		(Belgium) Spa 31 May-1 June		(Germany) Nürburgring 12–13 July		(Netherlands) Assen 3 August		(Belgium) Zolder 30 August		(Belgium) Spa 4–5 October		(Netherlands) Zandvoort 19 October			Points
Pos	No.	Driver	Team	1	2	3	4	5	6	7	8	9	10	11	12	13	14	15	Points
1	11	(Australia) Anton de Pasquale	Lechner Racing School	1	1	2	2	1	1	1	2	4	1	1	6	1	1	7	328
2	99	(Estonia) Ralf Aron	Scuderia Nordica	8	5	8	7	7	8	2	1	3	2	2	1	5	6	2	263
3	10	(Austria) Florian Janits	Lechner Racing School	4	8	4	12	9	7	5	3	1	4	3	2	4	3	1	250
4	62	(Austria) Ferdinand Habsburg	Lechner Racing School	6	2	18	6	5	6	3	6	6	7	4	5	2	2	9	213
5	69	(Belgium) Max Defourny	Provily Racing (1-2); Lechner Racing School (3-15)	5	9	5	3	3	4	6	5	9	5	6	3	6	4	4	207
6	3	(Netherlands) Janneau Esmeijer	Provily Racing	3	4	1	1	4	2	4	4	2	3	5	11				201
7	9	(Sweden) Oliver Söderström	Scuderia Nordica	6	6	6	4	11	9	11	11	5	8	8	7	8	8	8	177
8	21	(Netherlands) Boris Kolff	Provily Racing	10	7	16	14	8	5	8	10	13†	12	9	10	7	5	3	151
9	17	(Netherlands) Paul Sieljes	Stuart Racing Team	14	14	13	16	13	13	13	12	12†	9	11	12	9	7	11	136
10	22	(Germany) Cedric Piro	Pirosport	13	15	14	10	10	11	10	14	10	11	10	8	10	12	DNS	115
11	4	(Germany) Nicholas Otto	Captain Racing							12	5	8	10	7	4	13	11	6	103
12	20	(Netherlands) Larry ten Voorde	Pirosport (1-8); MB Motorsport (9-10)	2	3	21	13	2	3	16†	17†	7	6						90
13	1	(Germany) Marcel Lenerz	Stuart Racing Team	8	11	20	5	12	10	DSQ	8	11†	DNS	12	9				83
14	95	(Sweden) Pontus Fredricsson	Trackstar Racing	11	10	7	15			9	9								65
15	5	(Belgium) Simon Mirguet	Provily Racing	12	13	9	9	6	12										65
16	12	(New Zealand) Paul Blomqvist	Trackstar Racing			3	8			15†	13								47
17	1	(Netherlands) Roy Geerts	Stuart Racing Team													3	13	10	39
18	77	(Germany) Laurents Hörr	Dutt Motorsport													9	11	5	38
19	12	(Austria) Jakob Schober	Lechner Racing School													11	10	12†	30
20	16	(Netherlands) Wouter Boerekamps	Provily Racing							7	7								28
21	100	(Sweden) Lukas Sundahl	Sundahl Racing			10	11												21
22	7	(Belgium) Neal van Vaerenbergh	Stuart Racing Team	15	12														15
23	800	(Finland) Ilmari Korpivaara	Finndrive			11	17												14
24	9	(Sweden) Karl Ero	Trackstar Racing			12	19			14	16								12
25	440	(Sweden) Rasmus Ericsson	Lyran Engineering			15	18												9
26	810	(Sweden) David Nordgren	Trackstar Racing			17	20												5
27	700	(Finland) Joonas Lappalainen	Finndrive			19	DNS												2

Colour	Result
Gold	Winner
Silver	Second place
Bronze	Third place
Green	Points classification
Blue	Non-points classification
Blue	Non-classified finish (NC)
Purple	Retired, not classified (Ret)
Red	Did not qualify (DNQ)
Red	Did not pre-qualify (DNPQ)
Black	Disqualified (DSQ)
White	Did not start (DNS)
White	Withdrew (WD)
White	Race cancelled (C)
Blank	Did not practice (DNP)
Blank	Did not arrive (DNA)
Blank	Excluded (EX)

Notes:

- † — Drivers did not finish the race, but were classified

==== Teams' championship ====
Pos	Team	Points
1	(Austria) Lechner Racing School	366
2	(Estonia) Scuderia Nordica	270
3	(Netherlands) Provily Racing	252
4	(Germany) Pirosports	157
5	(Netherlands) Stuart Racing Team	146
6	(Germany) Captain racing	97
7	(Sweden) Trackstar Racing	65
8	(Germany) Dutt Motorsport	37
9	(Belgium) MB Motorsport	29
Guest team ineligible for points
	(Sweden) Sundahl Racing	
	(Sweden) Lyran Engineering	
	(Finland) Finndrive	

== Other Formulas powered by Renault championships ==
=== 2014 Remus Formula Renault 2.0 Cup season ===
The season was held between 17 May and 11 October and raced across Austria, Germany, Italy and Czech Republic. The races occur with other categories as part of the Austria Formula 3 Cup, this section presents only the Austrian Formula Renault 2.0 classifications. Division II cars were built between 2000 - 2009.

Position	1st	2nd	3rd	4th	5th	6th	7th	8th	9th	10th
Points	25	18	15	12	10	8	6	4	2	1

Pos	Driver	Team	(Austria) RBR 17-18 May		(Austria) SAL 4-5 Jul		(Germany) HOC1 25-26 Jul		(Czech Republic) MOS 9-10 Aug		(Italy) IMO 13-14 Sept		(Czech Republic) BRN 26-27 Sept		(Germany) HOC2 10-11 Oct		Pts	Pts (Div. II)
1	(Switzerland) Thomas Aregger	Equipe Bernoise	4	3	2	1	2	1	3	3	3	2	1	1	2	Ret	244	280
2	(Switzerland) Kurt Böhlen	BMS Böhlen Motorsport	3	5	1	3	1	Ret	2	1					3	2	166	204
3	(Switzerland) Moritz Müller Crepon	Team Heuri Rennwagen	5	6			3	2	Ret	4	2	3	2	2	4	3	159	154
4	(Switzerland) Max Biedermann	Inter EuropolCompetition							1	2	1	1					93	N/A
5	(Czech Republic) Josef Zaruba	China BRT by JCS Team	1	1													50	N/A
=5	(Germany) Philipp Hamprecht	Inter Europol Competition													1	1	50	N/A
7	(Germany) Oliver Stark	Stark Motorsport			3	2											33	33
8	(United States) Robert Siska	Inter Europol Competition											3	3			30	N/A
9	(Czech Republic) Jaroslav Pospisil	Krenek Motorsport									4	4					24	N/A
10	(Czech Republic) Martin Kunc	Krenek Motorsport							4	5							22	N/A
=10	(Germany) Glenn Rupp	Inter Europol Competition													5	4	22	N/A
12	(Slovakia) Christian Malcharek	Krenek Motorsport	2	Ret													18	N/A
=12	(Ukraine) Danilo Pronenko	AS Motorsport-GSK Team	Ret	2													18	N/A
14	(Germany) Hartmut Bertsch	Conrad Racing Sport	7												6	Ret	14	22
15	(Canada) David Richert	Inter Europol Competition	Ret	4													12	N/A
16	(Germany) Matthias Stark	Stark Motorsport	6														8	12

=== 2014 Formula Renault 2.0 Argentina season ===
All cars use Tito 02 chassis, all races were held in Argentina, except for one round in Chile.

Position	1st	2nd	3rd	4th	5th	6th	7th	8th	9th	10th	Pole
Points	20	15	12	10	8	6	4	3	2	1	1

1 extra point in each race for regularly qualified drivers.

Pos	Driver	Team	(Argentina) RAF 22-23 Mar		(Argentina) VIE 13 Apr	(Argentina) OCA 3-4 May		(Argentina) ROS 24-25 May		(Argentina) PAM 14-15 Jun		(Argentina) BUA 19-20 Jul		(Argentina) RES 16-17 Aug		(Argentina) ZON 4-5 Oct		(Argentina) RHO 25-26 Oct			(Chile) COD 8-9 Nov			(Argentina) SLU 27/30 Nov		Points
1	(Argentina) Manuel Mallo	Werner Basalto	7	3	2	3	6	17	7	13	4	4	?	1	1	14	7	1	2	1	1	1	1	2	1	284
2	(Argentina) Federico Cavagnero	JLS Motorsport	6	5	?	1	1	2	2	4	1	15	?	15	3	7	4	4	15	2	2	2	2	5	4	240
3	(Argentina) Guillermo Rey	Litoral Group	3	15	1	2		3	9	18	17	1	?	3	2	5	1	5	5	15	6	5	6	4	2	209
4	(Argentina) Miguel Calamari	Werner Competición (?), Corsa Racing (?)	1	1	?	4	17	19	4	3	2	6	?	5	14	8	8	2	1	3	7	8	10	7	6	185
5	(Chile) Felipe Schmauk	Litoral Group	10	17	3	9	3	1	1	6	9	5	?	4	15	17	2	6	10		15	4	4	1	3	179
6	(Argentina) Emiliano Marino	Werner Competición	4	7	?	6	16	5	5	17	3	2	?	9	6	11	13	3	4	14	4	3	7	3	15	148
7	(Argentina) Agustín Lima Capitao	Werner Competición (?), JLS Motorsport (?)	2	4	?			7	6	16	6	3	?	14	16	1	5	9	12	6	18	11	5	6	5	120
8	(Argentina) Martín Moggia	Litoral Group	12	9	?	8	10	8	8	10	7	9	?	2	4	4	3	7	7	17	3	15	3	8	7	119
9	(Argentina) Gastón Cabrera	Corsa Racing	11	2	?	5		6	14	12	5	16	?	11	17	6	6	10	13	18	5	6	11	9	9	78
10	(Argentina) Carlos Javier Merlo	Corsa Racing				16	2	4	3	1	14				5											69
11	(Argentina) Nicolás Dominici	Corsa Junior				18	4	10	19	5	15	10	?	17	18	9	9		3	4	8	9	8	12	14	63
12	(Argentina) Nicolas Cazal	JLS Motorsport	13	13	?	13	13	11	12	2	18	13	?	13	11	3	15	14	18	7	11	7	17	10	10	55
13	(Uruguay) Francisco Cammarota	Litoral Group	8	6	?	7	11	16	15	7	8	7	?	6	8	15	17		6	13						48
14	(Argentina) Hernán Satler	Werner Junior	9	8	?	10	5	12	16	15	11	12	?	12	7	10	10	17	16	9	9	13	9	11	16	46
15	(Chile) Maximiliano Matías Soto Zurita	Werner Competición (?), Corsa Racing (?)	14	14	?	12	12	14	10	9	10	11	?	7	10	12	12	8	17	5	12	10	13	16	8	35
16	(Argentina) Santiago Mallo	Werner Basalto	18	12	?	19	8	15	17	11	12	17	?	16	9	13	16	11	19	16	17	18	12	13	11	20
17	(Chile) Kevin Toledo	Werner Competición														2	14				13	16	18			17
18	(Argentina) Gastón Martínez	Pampa Racing	17	10		15	14			14	13	18	?	8	12			12	8	12	10	14	14			16
19	(Argentina) Fernando Ayala	Litoral Group	15	16		11	9	9	11	8	16	8	?													15
20	(Argentina) Nicolas Antonio Salamone	Barovero Racing Team										14	?	10	13	16	11	15	9	8	16	17	16	15	13	11
21	(Argentina) Santiago Piovano	JLS Motorsport	5		?																					9
22	(Argentina) Andres Nestor Barovero	Barovero Racing Team				17	7	13	13																	6
23	(Argentina) Pedro Sabella	MS Racing Car	16	11	?	14	15	18	18																	4
24	(Argentina) Rudi Samuel Bundziak	Werner Competición																13	14	11	14	12	15	14	12	4
25	(Argentina) Víctor Fabián Trungelliti	Werner Junior																16	11	10						3
26	(Chile) José Luis Riffo	Litoral Group																			DNS					1
