= Autódromo Internacional de Codegua =

Race track in Codehua, Chile

- Full Circuit (2014–present)
- Location: Codegua, Chile
- Coordinates: 34°02′13″S 70°37′55″W
- Broke ground: 2012
- Opened: May 2014; 11 years ago
- Major events: Súper TC 2000 (2014–present)

Full Circuit (2014–present)
- Length: 4.388 km (2.727 mi)
- Turns: 14
- Race lap record: 1:54.403 ( (Argentina) Esteban Guerrieri, Toyota Corolla XI, 2014, Súper TC 2000)

The Autódromo Internacional de Codegua is a 4.388 km (2.727 mi) race track located in Codegua, O'Higgins Region, Chile, 18 km (11 mi) northeast of the city of Rancagua, and 72 km (45 mi) south of Santiago.

It is one of the main race tracks in Chile, regularly hosting Chilean national race competitions, as well as being open for private use.

It hosted the prestigious Argentinian category Súper TC 2000 in 2014, and there were some chances to host a MotoGP race in the past.

== See also ==
- Rancagua
