= 2019 Formula Renault seasons =

This article describes all the 2019 seasons of Formula Renault series across the world.

== Unofficial Formula Renault championships ==
=== 2019 Ultimate Cup Series Monoplace season ===
The season was held between 23 March and 3 November, predominantly based in France but also racing across Europe in Tatuus FR 2.0 chassis. Gentleman Drivers are indicated in blue.

Position	1st	2nd	3rd	4th	5th	6th	7th	8th	9th	10th	11th	12th	13th	14th	15th	16th	17th	18th	19th	20th
Points	28	24	20	17	16	15	14	13	12	11	10	9	8	7	6	5	4	3	2	1

Pos	Driver	Team	(Portugal) Estoril 23-24 March			(France) Dijon 26-27 April			(Slovakia) Slovakiaring 25 May			(Italy) Mugello 28-29 June			(Spain) Valencia 27-28 Sept			(France) Magny-Cours 19-20 Oct			(France) Paul Ricard 2-3 Nov			Pts
1	(Belgium) Amaury Bonduel	Lamo Racing	2	1	1	1	2	1	1	3	9	8	4	1	1	1	1	1	3	10	1	1	1	418
2	(France) Sacha Lehmann	Lamo Racing	4	4	2	2	1	2	2	1	1	4	1	5	2	11	DNP	Ret	1	14	2	3	3	413
3	(France) Augustin Collinot	Lamo Racing	3	3	Ret	3	3	3	3	2	2	3	3	4	10	2	2	2	2	1	4	Ret	5	374
4	(France) Baptiste Berthelot	CD Sport	12	9	7	11	Ret	7	5	7	Ret	1	2	2	3	Ret	Ret	3	6	2	5	4	2	230
5	(Italy) Pietro Peccenini	TS Corse	9	6	6	6	7	9	4	6	3	5	7	6	4	3	3	4	4	5	9	5	8	229
6	(France) Brice Morabito	TS Corse	1	2	5	4	4	4	Ret	5	Ret													219
7	(France) Franck Gauvin	Graff Racing	6	13	8	7	9	6	7	10	13	11	12	9	5	6	5	Ret	5	3	13	7	20	210
8	(France) Maxime Lebreton	Formula Motorsport	10	17	9	5	5	Ret	9	11	6	6	9	8	Ret	5	6	Ret	10	7				202
9	(France) Victor Jabouille	Lamo Racing	8	16	10	12	8	8	Ret	4	4	10	5	DNS										188
10	(France) Alain Bucher	Lamo Racing	11	8	11	10	12	10	13	15	5	16	15	14	8	9	8	Ret	9	8	16	12	17	175
11	(France) Nicolas Pironneau	Formula Motorsport	5	7	4				6	8	12				6	4	4				25	DNS	DNS	168
12	(France) Romain Geoffroy	Lamo Racing	14	12	14	16	17	14	12	14	8	18	16	18	Ret	13	10				15	11	12	131
13	(France) Thierry Aimard	Lamo Racing	Ret	11	13	14	13	15	11	12	10	19	17	17	12	10	16	7	11	12	21	15	14	127
14	(Switzerland) Walter Rykart	Formula Motorsport	Ret	14	12	8	10	Ret	Ret	16	7	14	14	13	11	Ret	11	Ret	8	6	18	14	Ret	116
15	(Russia) Konstantin Gugkaev	Formula Motorsport							8	9	11	7	11	7										108
16	(France) Thomas Mialane	Graff Racing	7	5	3																			100
17	(France) Thierry Malhomme	Lamo Racing	Ret	10	DNS				10	13	14	15	18	16	Ret	Ret	Ret							88
18	(France) Vincent Iogna	Formula Motorsport				9	6	5				12	Ret	11							6	6	10	62
19	(France) Michel Piroird	Formula Motorsport				13	11	11				9	10	10							10	8	9	62
20	(France) Erwin Creed	Formula Motorsport										2	6	3				Ret	DNP	DNP				59
21	(United States) Howard Sklar	TS Corse	13	15	15	18	16	16				20	19	19	14	14	15	6	13	Ret	23	18	16	57
22	(France) Fabrice Rossello	Graff Racing										13	8	15	9	16	12	5	7	4	26	DNS	DNS	27
23	(France) Alain Rebus	Lamo Racing				15	14	12																22
24	(France) Philippe Haezebrouck	Formula Motorsport										17	13	12	7	8	7							21
25	(France) Serge Coperchini	Lamo Racing				17	15	13																18
-	(France) Frederic Boillot	Krafft Racing																			22	17	18	0
-	(France) Gregory Choukroun	Lamo Racing																			17	DNS	13	0
-	(France) Francois Destandau	Lamo Racing													Ret	12	13							0
-	(Switzerland) Caryl Fritsche	Lamo Racing																			19	Ret	11	0
-	(France) Sébastien Geny-Gros	Lamo Racing																			14	Ret	Ret	0
-	(France) Daniel Harout	Lycee pro D'Artagnan																			11	Ret	Ret	0
-	(Switzerland) Konstantin Lachenauer	Formula Motorsport																			3	Ret	7	0
-	(France) Alexandre Lafourcade	Lamo Racing																			12	10	DNS	0
-	(France) Baptiste Leonard	Formula Motorsport																9	14	Ret	24	13	19	0
-	(France) Julien Levray	Zig Zag																			7	2	4	0
-	(France) Nicolas Matile	Zig Zag																			20	16	15	0
-	(France) Evan Meunier	Krafft Racing																			8	9	6	0
-	(Italy) Gianluigi Palego	TS Course													15	7	9							0
-	(Australia) Basile Papadimitriou	Inter Europol Competition																10	Ret	11				0
-	(United States) Robert Siska	Inter Europol Competition													13	15	14	8	12	9				0
-	(Italy) Vincezo Francesco Tesoriero	Inter Europol Competition																11	15	13				0
Pos	Driver	Team	(Portugal) Estoril			(France) Dijon			(Slovakia) Slovakiaring			(Italy) Mugello			(Spain) Valencia			(France) Magny-Cours			(France) Paul Ricard			Pts

=== 2019 Drexler-Automotive Formula Renault 2.0 Pokal season ===
The season was held between 5th April and 13 October, and raced across Austria, Italy, Czech Republic and Germany. The races occur with other categories cars as part of the 2019 Austria Formula 3 Cup, this section presents only the Austrian Formula Renault 2.0L classification.

Position	1st	2nd	3rd	4th	5th	6th	7th	8th	9th	10th
Points	25	18	15	12	10	8	6	4	2	1

Pos	Driver	Team	(Italy) Monza 6-7 April		(Austria) Red Bull Ring 18-19 May		(Italy) Imola 22-23 June		(Czech Republic) Most 29-30 June		(Italy) Mugello 20-21 July		(Czech Republic) Brno 7-8 Sept		(Hungary) Hungaroring 12-13 Oct			Pts
1	(Austria) Nico Gruber	Team Hoffmann Racing			2	1	1	Ret	1	1	1	1	2	2	1	1	1	250
2	(Austria) Dr. Norbert Groer	Team Hoffmann Racing	3	4	4	5	5	2	Ret	4	3	3	9	4	7	8	6	175
3	(Czech Republic) Matej Kacovsky	Team HKC Racing	2	2			3	1			2	2						81.5
4	(Switzerland) Simon Stoller	Team Hoffmann Racing	1	1			2	Ret										68
5	(Switzerland) Thomas Aregger	Equipe Bernoise	Ret	3	3	4	4	Ret										60
6	(Hungary) Robert Hefler	F-Racing 2000			Ret	3							3	3				54
7	(United States) Robert Siska	Inter Europol Competition			7	WD									10	9	7	51
8	(Germany) Hermann Averbeck	Hermann Averbeck	4	5							4	Ret			11	10	Ret	48
9	(Czech Republic) Thomas Chabr	Chabr Motorsport							3	3			11	5				37
10	(Germany) Matthias Lüthen	Lüthen Motorsport GmbH													9	7	Ret	33
11	(Switzerland) Stephan Glaser	CSG Motorsport Academy											10	10				22
12	(Czech Republic) Vaclav Safar	GT2 Motorsport							2	2								18
13	(Germany) Hartmut Bertsch	Conrad Racing Sport			8	WD												10
Drivers ineligible to score points
-	(Poland) Mirecki Bartlomiej	BM Racing Team			1	2							1	1	2	2	2	-
-	(Hungary) Nikolas Szabo	F-Racing 2000			6	9							4	6	3	3	DNS	-
-	(Hungary) Lajos Szomszéd	F-Racing 2000											6	8	4	4	3	-
-	(Hungary) Laszlo Turak	Nivo Motorsport Kft.			5	7							7	9	5	5	8	-
-	(Hungary) Zsolt Balogh	HF Racing Team			Ret	6							8	7	6	6	5	-
-	(Hungary) Gabor Martin Lengyel	Nivo Motorsport Kft.			WD	8							5	Ret	8	DNS	4	-
Pos	Driver	Team	(Italy) Monza		(Austria) Red Bull Ring		(Italy) Imola		(Czech Republic) Most		(Italy) Mugello		(Czech Republic) Brno		(Hungary) Hungaroring			Pts

=== 2019 Formula Renault 2.0 Argentina season ===
All cars use Tito 02 chassis, all races were held in Argentina.

Position	1st	2nd	3rd	4th	5th	6th	7th	8th	9th	10th	Pole
Points	20	15	12	10	8	6	4	3	2	1	1

1 extra point in each race for regularly qualified drivers.
