= Daniel Cingolani =

Argentine racing driver (born 1961)

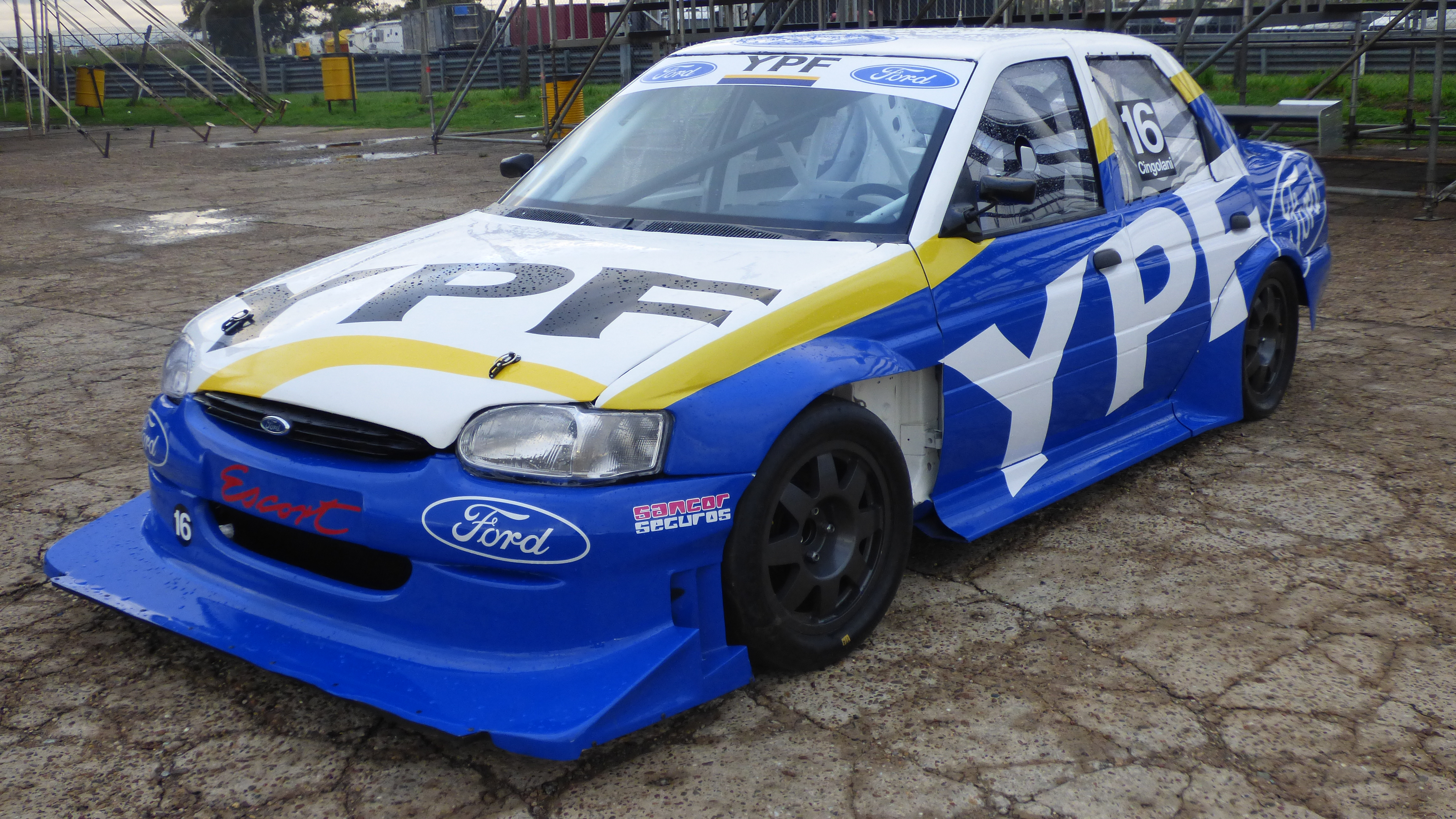

Daniel Horacio Cingolani (born May 28, 1961, in Buenos Aires Province), is an Argentine racing driver. He won the TC2000 championship in 2000.

Sporting positions
Preceded by Juan Manuel Silva	TC2000 champion 2000	Succeeded by Gabriel Ponce de León
