= 2018 Formula Renault seasons =

This article describes all the 2018 seasons of Formula Renault series across the world.

== Unofficial Formula Renault championships ==
=== 2018 Remus Formula Renault 2.0 Pokal season ===
The season was held between 13 April and 9 September and raced across Austria, Italy, Czech Republic and Germany. The races occur with other categories cars as part of the 2018 Austria Formula 3 Cup, this section presents only the Austrian Formula Renault 2.0L classification.

Position	1st	2nd	3rd	4th	5th	6th	7th	8th	9th	10th
Points	25	18	15	12	10	8	6	4	2	1

Pos	Driver	Team	(Germany) Hockenheim 13-14 Apr		(Austria) Red Bull Ring 18-20 May		(Italy) Monza 1-3 June		(Czech Republic) Most 22-24 Jun		(Germany) Lausitzring 13-15 Jul		(Italy) Imola 27-29 Jul		(Czech Republic) Brno 7-9 Sept		Pts
1	(Switzerland) Florian Münger	Jo Zeller Racing	3	3			1	1	4	2	3	WD	1	3	9	10	190
2	(Switzerland) Stephan Glaser	CSG Motorsport Academy	2	2			2	2	3	3					10	11	120
3	(United States) Robert Siska	Inter Europol Competition			5	4							2	2			86
4	(Czech Republic) Tomas Chabr	Chabr Motorsport							2	1					5	5	76
5	(Germany) Hartmut Bertsch	Conrad Racing Sport	1	1													50
=5	(Germany) Oliver Stark	Team HKC									1	1					50
7	(Italy) Karim Satori	Speed Motor			4	9											43
=7	(Switzerland) Thomas Aregger	Equipe Bernoise													4	4	43
9	(Czech Republic) Vaclav Safar	Vaclav Safar							1	4							37
10	(Switzerland) Adrian Knapp	Adrian Knapp									2	2					36
11	(Austria) Dr. Norbert Groer	Dr. Norbert Groer													8	7	27
12	(Czech Republic) Vladimir Netusil	Evectiv Racing			3	7									3	3	25
13	(Germany) Michael Grosse-Aschhoff	Michael Grosse-Aschhoff													12	13	14
14	(Germany) Felix Grosse-Aschhoff	Felix Grosse-Aschhoff													DNS (Note: Despite the classification suggesting a DNS, 6 points representing an 8th (in class) finish appear on the final standings.)	15	10
Drivers ineligible to score points
-	(Poland) Mirecki Bartlomiej	BM Racing Team			1	1									1	2	-
-	(Hungary) Tamas Ronai	F-Racing 2000			2	2									2	1	-
-	(Italy) Marco Minelli	Marco Minelli											3	1			-
-	(Hungary) Robert Hefler	F-Racing 2000			6	3									6	6	-
-	(Hungary) Roland Stern	F-Racing 2000			7	5									6	6	-
-	(Hungary) Laszlo Turak	Nivo Motorsport Kft.			9	6									11	9	-
-	(Hungary) Zsolt Balogh	HF Racing Team			10	6									Ret	14	-
-	(Hungary) Balazs Volenter	Nivo Motorsport Kft.			8	Ret											-
-	(Hungary) Martin Lengyel	Nivo Motorsport Kft.													Ret	14	-

=== 2018 Formula Renault 2.0 Argentina season ===
All cars use Tito 02 chassis, all races were held in Argentina.

Position	1st	2nd	3rd	4th	5th	6th	7th	8th	9th	10th	Pole
Points	20	15	12	10	8	6	4	3	2	1	1

1 extra point in each race for regularly qualified drivers.
