= Fórmula Nacional Argentina =

Single-Seater Racing Championship

- Category: Formula Renault
- Region: Argentina
- Constructors: Tito
- Engine suppliers: Renault
- Official website: Official website

The Fórmula Nacional Argentina, formerly known as Formula Renault 2.0 Argentina, Formula Renault 1.6 Argentina and Formula Renault Argentina, is an open wheel racing series founded in 1980. It is based in Argentina.

== Regulations ==
Since 2010 the cars have been powered by a 2000cc Renault production engine. Prior to this (from the series' inception in 1980 to 2009) the cars were powered by a 1600cc Renault production engine. Tito is currently the only chassis make allowed. Similar Tito 02 cars are used in the Chilean Formula Three Championship.

Tyres are allocated to each driver in sets of 4 at each race meeting.

== Champions ==
All champions were Argentine-registered.

Season	Champion
1980	Víctor Rosso
1981	Carlos Lauricella
1982	Roberto Urretavizcaya
1983	Néstor Gurini
1984	Néstor Gurini
1985	Miguel Angel Etchegaray
1986	Gabriel Furlán
1987	Daniel Neviani
1988	Luis Belloso
1989	Sergio Solmi
1990	Omar Martinez
1991	Omar Martinez
1992	Norberto Della Santina
1993	Juan Manuel Silva
1994	Guillermo Di Giacinti
1995	Brian Smith
1996	Martín Basso
1997	Mauro Fartuszek
1998	Gabriel Ponce de León
1999	Mariano Acebal
2000	Esteban Guerrieri
2001	Rafael Morgenstern
2002	Rafael Morgenstern
2003	Maximiliano Merlino
2004	Ezequiel Bosio
2005	Lucas Benamo
2006	Mariano Werner
2007	Mariano Werner
2008	Guido Falaschi
2009	Facundo Ardusso
2010	Nicolás Trosset
2011	Rodrigo Rogani
2012	Carlos Javier Merlo
2013	Julián Santero
2014	Manuel Mallo
2015	Martín Moggia
2016	Rudi Bundziak
2017	Hernán Satler
2018	Lucas Vicino
2019	Guido Moggia
2020–21	Jorge Barrio
2021	Jorge Barrio
2022	Tiago Pernía
2023	Nicolás Suárez
2024	Santiago Chiarello
2025	Julián Ramos
