= 2017 Formula Renault seasons =

This article describes all the 2017 seasons of Formula Renault series around the world.

== Unofficial Formula Renault championships ==
=== 2017 Remus Formula Renault 2.0 Pokal season ===
The season was held between 7 April and 8 October and raced across Austria, Italy, Czech Republic and Germany. The races occur with other categories cars as part of the 2017 Austria Formula 3 Cup, this section presents only the Austrian Formula Renault 2.0L classification.

Position	1st	2nd	3rd	4th	5th	6th	7th	8th	9th	10th
Points	12.5	9	7.5	6	5	4	3	2	1	0.5

Pos	Driver	Team	(Germany) HOC 7-9 Apr		(Italy) IMO 28-30 Apr	(Austria) RBR 19-21 May		(Belgium) Spa 23-25 Jun		(Germany) LAU 14-15 Jul	(Czech Republic) BRN 8-10 Sept		(Italy) Mugello 6-8 Oct		Pts
1	(Switzerland) Thomas Aregger	Equipe Bernoise	1	1		1	1	1	1		1	1			100
2	(Switzerland) Stephan Glaser	CSG Racing Akademy	3	3		EX	3	2	2		Ret	3			48
3	(United States) Robert Siska	Inter Europol Competition											1	1	25
4	(Switzerland) Sando Nüssli	Jo Zeller Racing	2	2											18
=4	(Germany) Hartmut Bertsch	Conrad Racing Sport				2	2								18
=4	(Austria) Josef Kandler	Josef Kandler									2	2			18

=== 2017 Formula Renault 2.0 Argentina season ===
All cars use Tito 02 chassis, all races were held in Argentina.

Position	1st	2nd	3rd	4th	5th	6th	7th	8th	9th	10th	Pole
Points	20	15	12	10	8	6	4	3	2	1	1

1 extra point in each race for regularly qualified drivers.
