= Autodromo =

Autodromo or Autódromo is an Italian, Portuguese, and Spanish word for race track.

It may refer to:

- Aerautodromo di Modena, Modena, Italy
- Algarve International Circuit (Autodromo Internacional Algarve), Portimão, Algarve, Portugal
- Autódromo Chiapas, Berriozábal, Chiapas
- Autódromo Ciudad de Concordia, Concordia, Entre Ríos, Argentina
- Autódromo Ciudad de Nueve de Julio - Guillermo Yoyo Maldonado, Nueve de Julio, Buenos Aires Province, Argentina
- Autódromo Ciudad de Oberá, Oberá, Misiones, Argentina
- Autódromo Ciudad de Rafaela, Rafaela, Santa Fe, Argentina
- Autódromo Ciudad de La Rioja, La Rioja, La Rioja Province, Argentina
- Autódromo Ciudad de Viedma, Viedma, Río Negro, Argentina
- Autódromo de Benguela, Benguela, Angola
- Autódromo de Concepción del Uruguay, Concepción del Uruguay, Argentina
- Autódromo de Luanda, Luanda, Angola
- Autódromo de Quéretaro at the EcoCentro Expositor Querétaro, El Marqués, Mexico
- Autódromo de Sitges-Terramar, Sant Pere de Ribes, Barcelona, Catalonia, Spain
- Autódromo de Tocancipá, Tocancipá, Cundinamarca, Colombia
- Autodromo del Levante, Binetto, Apulia, Italy
- Autodromo dell'Umbria, Magione, Italy
- Autodromo di Modena, Marzaglia, Province of Modena, Italy
- Autodromo di Mores, Mores, Sardinia, Italy
- Autodromo di Pergusa, Pergusa, Italy
- Autodromo di Santa Monica, former name of the Misano World Circuit, Misano Adriatico, Province of Rimini, Emilia-Romagna, Italy
- Autódromo Eduardo Copello, Quebrada de Zonda, San Juan, San Juan Province
- Autódromo Eduardo Prudêncio Cabrera, Rivera, Uruguay
- Autódromo Enrique Freile, El Calafate, Santa Cruz Province, Argentina
- Autódromo Eusebio Marcilla, Junín, Buenos Aires Province, Argentina
- Autódromo Ezequiel Crisol, Bahía Blanca, Buenos Aires Province, Argentina
- Autódromo Guadalajara, Guadalajara, Jalisco, Mexico
- Autódromo Hermanos Emiliozzi, Olavarría, Buenos Aires, Argentina
- Autódromo Hermanos Rodríguez, Mexico City, Mexico
- Autódromo Internacional Ayrton Senna (Caruaru), Caruaru, Pernambuco, Brazil
- Autódromo Internacional Ayrton Senna (Goiânia), Goiânia, Goiás, Brazil
- Autódromo Internacional Ayrton Senna (Londrina), Londrina, Paraná, Brazil
- Autódromo Internacional de Cascavel, Cascavel, Paraná, Brazil
- Autódromo Internacional de Codegua, Codegua, Chile
- Autódromo Internacional de Curitiba, Pinhais, Paraná, Brazil
- Autodrómo Internacional de Las Américas, Santo Domingo, Dominican Republic
- Autódromo Internacional de Mato Grosso, Cuiabá, Mato Grosso, Brazil
- Autódromo Internacional de Tarumã, Viamão, Rio Grande do Sul, Brazil
- Autódromo Internacional de Turagua Pancho Pepe Cróquer, Turagua, Venezuela
- Autodromo Internacional de Yahuarcocha, Ibarra, Ecuador
- Autódromo Internacional El Jabalí, Quezaltepeque, El Salvador
- Autódromo Internacional Nelson Piquet, Rio de Janeiro, Brazil
- Autódromo Internacional Nelson Piquet (Brasília), Brasília, Brazil
- Autódromo Internacional Orlando Moura, Campo Grande, Mato Grosso do Sul, Brazil
- Autódromo Internacional Potenza, Lima Duarte, Minas Gerais, Brazil
- Autódromo Internacional Virgílio Távora, Eusébio, Ceará, Brazil
- Autódromo Jorge Ángel Pena, San Martin, Mendoza, Argentina
- Autódromo José Carlos Bassi, Villa Mercedes, San Luis, Argentina
- Autódromo Juan Manuel Fangio, Balcarce, Buenos Aires Province
- Autódromo Juan Oria, Marcos Juárez, Córdoba, Argentina
- Autódromo Municipal Juan Manuel Fangio, Rosario, Santa Fe, Argentina
- Autódromo La Chutana, San Bartolo District, Peru
- Autódromo Mar y Valle, Trelew, Chubut Province, Argentina
- Autódromo Martín Miguel de Güemes, Salta, Salta Province, Argentina
- Autódromo Miguel E. Abed, Amozoc, near Puebla, Mexico
- Autódromo Monterrey, Apodaca, Nuevo León, Mexico
- Autódromo Oscar Cabalén, Alta Gracia, Córdoba, Argentina
- Autódromo Oscar y Juan Gálvez, Buenos Aires, Argentina
- Autódromo Parque Ciudad de Río Cuarto, Río Cuarto, Córdoba, Argentina
- Autódromo Parque Ciudad de General Roca, General Roca, Río Negro, Argentina
- Autódromo Parque Provincia del Neuquén, Centenario, Neuquén, Argentina
- Autódromo Parque de la Velocidad de San Jorge, San Jorge, Santa Fe, Argentina
- Autódromo Pedro Cofiño, Escuintla, Guatemala
- Autodromo Potosino, former name of the Super Óvalo Potosino, San Luis Potosí, Mexico
- Autódromo Provincia de La Pampa, Toay, La Pampa, Argentina
- Autódromo Ricardo Mejía, Bogotá, Colombia
- Autodromo Riccardo Paletti, Varano, Italy
- Autódromo Roberto Mouras, La Plata, Buenos Aires Province, Argentina
- Autódromo Rosamonte, Posadas, Argentina
- Autódromo Rosendo Hernández, San Luis-San Luis, Argentina
- Autódromo San Nicolás, San Nicolás de los Arroyos, Buenos Aires Province, Argentina
- Autódromo Santiago Yaco Guarnieri, Resistencia, Chaco, Argentina
- Autódromo Termas de Río Hondo, Termas de Río Hondo, Santiago del Estero, Argentina
- Autódromo Velo Città, Mogi Guaçu, São Paulo, Brazil
- Autódromo Víctor Borrat Fabini, El Pinar, Canelones Department, Uruguay
- Circuito do Estoril (Autodromo do Estoril), Alcabideche, Cascais, Portugal
- Imola Circuit (Autodromo Internazionale Enzo e Dino Ferrari), Imola, Emilia-Romagna, Italy
- Interlagos Circuit (Autódromo José Carlos Pace), Interlagos, São Paulo, Brazil
- Monza Circuit (Autodromo Nazionale Monza), Monza, Italy
- Mugello Circuit (Autodromo Internazionale del Mugello), Scarperia e San Piero, Florence, Tuscany, Italy

== Business ==
Autodromo may also refer to:

- Autodromo (company) (Carrozzeria Autodromo Modena), an Italian bus manufacturer.
