= 2023 Fórmula Nacional Argentina =

Motor racing competition

The 2023 Fórmula Nacional Argentina was a multi-event, Formula Renault 2.0 open-wheel single seater motor racing championship. The championship featured a mix of professional and amateur drivers. This championship was held under the Formula Renault Argentina moniker from 1980. This was the second season held under the Fórmula Nacional Argentina moniker.

The season started on 24 February, and was held over 24 races spanning twelve weekends. Nicolás Suárez won the Drivers' Championship, while the team of his closest competitor Emiliano Stang, Gabriel Werner Competición, won the Teams' Championship.

== Teams and drivers ==
All drivers competed with cars using a Tito-built chassis and a 2000cc Renault engine.

Team	No.	Driver	Rounds
Martinez Competición	3	(Argentina) Nicolás Suárez	All
Martinez Competición	10	(Argentina) Aixa Franke	3, 5
Martinez Competición	33	(Argentina) Valentina Funes	1–2, 4, 6–12
Martinez Competición	74	(Argentina) Santiago Chiarello	2–12
Aimar Motorsports	11	(Argentina) Andrés Brion	All
Aimar Motorsports	73	(Argentina) Brian Massa	All
Gabriel Werner Competición	17	(Argentina) Juan Pablo Traverso	All
Gabriel Werner Competición	62	(Argentina) Emiliano Stang	All
Gabriel Werner Competición	88	(Panama) Sebastián Ng	1–3, 5
Gabriel Werner Junior	19	(Argentina) Santiago Baztarrica	1–7, 9–12
Etchamendi Sport	27	(Uruguay) Gastón Irazú	All
LR Team	37	(Argentina) Martin Chíalvo	All
LR Team	63	(Chile) Giovanni Ramirez Pino	All
LR Team	113	(Argentina) Facundo Gutiérrez	All
Esteban Sport Group Formula	87	(Argentina) Thiago Bettino	1–6, 8–12
LFB Racing Team	42	(Peru) Daniella Ore	7–12

== Race calendar ==
The first round of the 2023 calendar was announced on 5 January 2023. Further rounds were concretized at later dates, bringing the total up to twelve events.

Round		Circuit	Date	Support bill	Map of circuit locations
1	R1	(Argentina) Autódromo Oscar y Juan Gálvez, Buenos Aires (Layout #8)	25 February	Turismo Competición 2000; TC2000 Series; Fiat Competizione	2023 Fórmula Nacional Argentina is located in Argentina
1	R2	(Argentina) Autódromo Oscar y Juan Gálvez, Buenos Aires (Layout #8)	26 February	Turismo Competición 2000; TC2000 Series; Fiat Competizione	2023 Fórmula Nacional Argentina is located in Argentina
2	R1	(Argentina) Autódromo Ciudad de Rafaela, Rafaela	18 March	Turismo Competición 2000; TC2000 Series; Fiat Competizione	2023 Fórmula Nacional Argentina is located in Argentina
2	R2	(Argentina) Autódromo Ciudad de Rafaela, Rafaela	19 March	Turismo Competición 2000; TC2000 Series; Fiat Competizione	2023 Fórmula Nacional Argentina is located in Argentina
3	R1	(Argentina) Autódromo Oscar Cabalén, Alta Gracia	22 April	Turismo Competición 2000; TC2000 Series	2023 Fórmula Nacional Argentina is located in Argentina
3	R2	(Argentina) Autódromo Oscar Cabalén, Alta Gracia	23 April	Turismo Competición 2000; TC2000 Series	2023 Fórmula Nacional Argentina is located in Argentina
4	R1	(Argentina) Autódromo Juan María Traverso, San Nicolás de los Arroyos	27 May	Top Race V6; Sport Prototipo	2023 Fórmula Nacional Argentina is located in Argentina
4	R2	(Argentina) Autódromo Juan María Traverso, San Nicolás de los Arroyos	28 May	Top Race V6; Sport Prototipo	2023 Fórmula Nacional Argentina is located in Argentina
5	R1	(Argentina) Autódromo Parque de la Velocidad de San Jorge, San Jorge	3 June	Turismo Competición 2000; TC2000 Series	2023 Fórmula Nacional Argentina is located in Argentina
5	R2	(Argentina) Autódromo Parque de la Velocidad de San Jorge, San Jorge	4 June	Turismo Competición 2000; TC2000 Series	2023 Fórmula Nacional Argentina is located in Argentina
6	R1	(Argentina) Autódromo Juan María Traverso, San Nicolás de los Arroyos	24 June	Turismo Competición 2000; Campeonato Superbike Argentina	2023 Fórmula Nacional Argentina is located in Argentina
6	R2	(Argentina) Autódromo Juan María Traverso, San Nicolás de los Arroyos	25 June	Turismo Competición 2000; Campeonato Superbike Argentina	2023 Fórmula Nacional Argentina is located in Argentina
7	R1	(Argentina) Autódromo Ciudad de La Rioja, La Rioja	15 July	Turismo Competición 2000; TC2000 Series	2023 Fórmula Nacional Argentina is located in Argentina
7	R2	(Argentina) Autódromo Ciudad de La Rioja, La Rioja	16 July	Turismo Competición 2000; TC2000 Series	2023 Fórmula Nacional Argentina is located in Argentina
8	R1	(Argentina) Autódromo Parque Ciudad de Río Cuarto, Río Cuarto	5 August	Turismo Competición 2000; TC2000 Series; Fiat Competizione	2023 Fórmula Nacional Argentina is located in Argentina
8	R2	(Argentina) Autódromo Parque Ciudad de Río Cuarto, Río Cuarto	6 August	Turismo Competición 2000; TC2000 Series; Fiat Competizione	2023 Fórmula Nacional Argentina is located in Argentina
9	R1	(Argentina) Autódromo Ciudad de Nueve de Julio - Guillermo Yoyo Maldonado, Nueve de Julio	9 September	Turismo Competición 2000; TC2000 Series; Fiat Competizione	2023 Fórmula Nacional Argentina is located in Argentina
9	R2	(Argentina) Autódromo Ciudad de Nueve de Julio - Guillermo Yoyo Maldonado, Nueve de Julio	10 September	Turismo Competición 2000; TC2000 Series; Fiat Competizione	2023 Fórmula Nacional Argentina is located in Argentina
10	R1	(Argentina) Autódromo Oscar y Juan Gálvez, Buenos Aires (Layout #8)	7 October	Turismo Competición 2000 (200 km de Buenos Aires); Stock Car Pro Series	2023 Fórmula Nacional Argentina is located in Argentina
10	R2	(Argentina) Autódromo Oscar y Juan Gálvez, Buenos Aires (Layout #8)	8 October	Turismo Competición 2000 (200 km de Buenos Aires); Stock Car Pro Series	2023 Fórmula Nacional Argentina is located in Argentina
11	R1	(Argentina) Autódromo Ciudad de Paraná, Paraná	4 November	Turismo Competición 2000; TC2000 Series	2023 Fórmula Nacional Argentina is located in Argentina
11	R2	(Argentina) Autódromo Ciudad de Paraná, Paraná	5 November	Turismo Competición 2000; TC2000 Series	2023 Fórmula Nacional Argentina is located in Argentina
12	R1	(Argentina) Autódromo Oscar Cabalén, Alta Gracia	25 November	Turismo Competición 2000; TC2000 Series	2023 Fórmula Nacional Argentina is located in Argentina
12	R2	(Argentina) Autódromo Oscar Cabalén, Alta Gracia	26 November	Turismo Competición 2000; TC2000 Series	2023 Fórmula Nacional Argentina is located in Argentina

== Race results ==
Round		Circuit	Pole position	Fastest lap	Winning driver	Winning team
1	R1	(Argentina) Autódromo Oscar y Juan Gálvez		(Argentina) Nicolás Suárez	(Panama) Sebastián Ng	Gabriel Werner Competición
1	R2	(Argentina) Autódromo Oscar y Juan Gálvez	(Argentina) Emiliano Stang	(Argentina) Emiliano Stang	(Argentina) Emiliano Stang	Gabriel Werner Competición
2	R1	(Argentina) Autódromo Ciudad de Rafaela		(Argentina) Juan Pablo Traverso	(Argentina) Nicolás Suárez	Martinez Competición
2	R2	(Argentina) Autódromo Ciudad de Rafaela	(Argentina) Emiliano Stang	(Argentina) Emiliano Stang	(Argentina) Juan Pablo Traverso	Gabriel Werner Competición
3	R1	(Argentina) Autódromo Oscar Cabalén		(Argentina) Emiliano Stang	(Argentina) Brian Massa	Aimar Motorsports
3	R2	(Argentina) Autódromo Oscar Cabalén	(Argentina) Nicolás Suárez	(Argentina) Brian Massa	(Argentina) Brian Massa	Aimar Motorsports
4	R1	(Argentina) Autódromo Juan María Traverso		(Argentina) Brian Massa	(Argentina) Nicolás Suárez	Martinez Competición
4	R2	(Argentina) Autódromo Juan María Traverso	(Argentina) Brian Massa	(Argentina) Emiliano Stang	(Argentina) Emiliano Stang	Gabriel Werner Competición
5	R1	(Argentina) Autódromo Parque de la Velocidad de San Jorge		(Argentina) Brian Massa	(Argentina) Nicolás Suárez	Martinez Competición
5	R2	(Argentina) Autódromo Parque de la Velocidad de San Jorge	(Argentina) Nicolás Suárez	(Argentina) Brian Massa	(Argentina) Brian Massa	Aimar Motorsports
6	R1	(Argentina) Autódromo Juan María Traverso		(Argentina) Emiliano Stang	(Argentina) Nicolás Suárez	Martinez Competición
6	R2	(Argentina) Autódromo Juan María Traverso	(Argentina) Emiliano Stang	(Argentina) Emiliano Stang	(Argentina) Emiliano Stang	Gabriel Werner Competición
7	R1	(Argentina) Autódromo Ciudad de La Rioja		(Argentina) Andrés Brion	(Argentina) Andrés Brion	Aimar Motorsports
7	R2	(Argentina) Autódromo Ciudad de La Rioja	(Argentina) Brian Massa	(Argentina) Nicolás Suárez	(Argentina) Nicolás Suárez	Martinez Competición
8	R1	(Argentina) Autódromo Parque Ciudad de Río Cuarto		(Argentina) Emiliano Stang	(Argentina) Emiliano Stang	Gabriel Werner Competición
8	R2	(Argentina) Autódromo Parque Ciudad de Río Cuarto	(Argentina) Brian Massa	(Argentina) Andrés Brion	(Argentina) Thiago Bettino	Esteban Sport Group Formula
9	R1	(Argentina) Autódromo Ciudad de Nueve de Julio - Guillermo Yoyo Maldonado		(Argentina) Emiliano Stang	(Argentina) Brian Massa	Aimar Motorsports
9	R2	(Argentina) Autódromo Ciudad de Nueve de Julio - Guillermo Yoyo Maldonado	(Argentina) Emiliano Stang	(Argentina) Emiliano Stang	(Argentina) Emiliano Stang	Gabriel Werner Competición
10	R1	(Argentina) Autódromo Oscar y Juan Gálvez		(Argentina) Thiago Bettino	(Argentina) Thiago Bettino	Esteban Sport Group Formula
10	R2	(Argentina) Autódromo Oscar y Juan Gálvez	(Argentina) Nicolás Suárez	(Argentina) Emiliano Stang	(Argentina) Emiliano Stang	Gabriel Werner Competición
11	R1	(Argentina) Autódromo Ciudad de Paraná		(Argentina) Santiago Baztarrica	(Argentina) Emiliano Stang	Gabriel Werner Competición
11	R2	(Argentina) Autódromo Ciudad de Paraná	(Argentina) Santiago Baztarrica	(Argentina) Nicolás Suárez	(Argentina) Emiliano Stang	Gabriel Werner Competición
12	R1	(Argentina) Autódromo Oscar Cabalén		(Argentina) Nicolás Suárez	(Argentina) Nicolás Suárez	Martinez Competición
12	R2	(Argentina) Autódromo Oscar Cabalén	(Argentina) Emiliano Stang	(Argentina) Emiliano Stang	(Argentina) Nicolás Suárez	Martinez Competición

== Season report ==
=== First half ===
Buenos Aires hosted the opening round of the 2023 season. The reversed-grid first race saw Etchamendi Sport's Gastón Irazú hit Thiago Bettino's stranded ESG Formula car, with both drivers being transferred to hospital afterwards. Stang climbed from tenth on the grid to first, before he made a mistake that allowed his teammate Sebastián Ng to take the win ahead of Juan Pablo Traverso and Aimar's Andrés Brion. The second race was characterized by a race-long battle between polesitter Stang and Martinez' Nicolás Suárez. The latter found no way past and had to be content with second place, ahead of Traverso. Stang therefore left the first round as the championship leader.

The second round happened at Rafaela. Two cars stalled at the start of race one but were avoided by all other drivers. Bettino took the lead throughout the ensuing chaos and led the race, before making a mistake and dropping back. This allowed Suárez into the lead, which he defended from Stang and Aimar's Brian Massa until the end. The leading pair was also fighting throughout the second race. After a late safety car restart, Suárez tried making a move for the lead on the final lap. The cars collided and went off track, allowing Traverso to come through and take the win. Brion and Martinez' Santiago Chiarello completed the podium. Suarez was able to take the points lead from Stang.

Next up was the round at Alta Gracia. Massa was clearly the fastest car all throughout the first race, climbing through the pack to take the lead by the mid-point. He went on to take the win, with Stang behind him having a similarly good race, rising up to second place. Chiarello completed the rostrum. Suárez started the second race from pole and was instantly attacked by Stang behind him. Massa waited until Stang made his move to surprise the pair and overtake both for the lead. From there on, the top three positions remained unchanged. Two second places for Stang saw him reclaim the championship lead, now nine points ahead of Suárez.

Teams and drivers then travelled to San Nicolás for the fourth event. The first race saw action all throughout, with five different drivers leading the race at points. Suárez was the final one and took the win ahead of Traverso and Brion. Points leader Stang collided with Bettino, he was judged to be at fault for the incident and was excluded from the race. He bounced back in the second race, taking the lead from polesitter Massa right at the start. The pair battled for a bit, but soon Massa fell back and allowed Stang to take the win. Crucially, Suárez managed to return to the podium once again, therefore taking a six-point championship lead ahead of Stang.

One week later, round five was held at San Jorge. Suárez had a remarkable first race, starting down the order and continually working his way up while Traverso, Ng, Massa and Stang contested the lead. The latter pair collided, allowing Suárez to take the lead and the win ahead of Ng. Massa came home third, but a penalty promoted Chiarello onto the rostrum. Suárez had pole position for the second race, but was unable to keep Massa behind him. Stang started fourth and soon got past Gabriel Werner Junior's Santiago Baztarrica, but could not take the fight to Suárez. Two races of Stang being outscored by Suárez saw the latter now with a sizable 33-point advantage.

The championship then returned to San Nicolás to conclude the first half of the season. Traverso started the first race from pole position. Suárez pressured him all race long, finally forcing a mistake on the final lap that saw Traverso fall to third as Stang also got by. The latter had pole position for the second race, which he controlled all throughout. A safety car restart was also no problem on the way to his third win of the season, ahead of Chiarello and Brion. Suárez had a difficult race, dropping from third on the grid to sixth at the finish. His win and second place saw Stang close up to Suárez in the standings.

=== Second half ===
La Rioja opened up the second half of the season. After four podiums through the first half of the championship, Brion was finally able to take his maiden win in the first race. Second was Suárez, back to extending his points lead as Stang could only manage sixth. Massa completed the podium, and was also the driver starting the second race from pole position. He was unable to make the most of his starting position, though, and only managed to finish seventh. The win went the way of Suárez, with Brion keeping his strong form to come second and Stang in third. The gap at the top of the standings now stood at 41 points.

Round eight happened at Río Cuarto and began with Massa taking pole position for the second race. Him and Stang were the fastest cars in the reverse-grid first race as they both climbed up the order. Stang won the race, with Massa second and Brion in third, while Suárez could only manage seventh. Massa converted his pole position into a win in the second race, but was later excluded for a technical irregularity. This promoted 15 year-old Bettino to his maiden win in the category, joined on the podium by Brion and Traverso. Championship contenders Stang and Suárez finished seventh and ninth, with Stang therefore reducing Suárez' points lead to 25 points.

The ninth round was originally planned to be held at Resistencia but was relocated to Nueve de Julio shortly before the event. The first race saw Massa take his fourth victory of the season, ahead of LR Team's Giovanni Ramirez Pino, who took his maiden podium, and Suárez, who again extended his lead over Stang in seventh. The latter bounced back by taking pole position for the second race and converting that into an unchallenged victory. Suárez followed behind him in second, but the six bonus points from qualifying saw Stang take six points out of Suárez' lead that now stood at 19 points. Massa took another podium, but a late title charge for him now seemed almost impossible.

Round ten was held in support of the 200 km de Buenos Aires. The first race saw Bettino took his second win of the year and of the series. Stang came second and LR Team's Martin Chíalvo scored his inaugural podium of the season. Suárez came fifth, meaning the gap to Stang had reduced further to only twelve points. Suárez was able to take pole position for the second race, with Stang second on the grid and both getting bonus qualifying points. In a close second encounter, Stang managed to pass Suárez and win by only 0.093 seconds. Chíalvo was on the podium once again, and the two title contenders now had a clear gap to the rest of the field and nine points between each other.

The penultimate round at Paraná saw Stang on a mission to overturn Suárez' advantage. He led both practice session, qualified ahead of his rival and went on to win the reversed-grid first race by climbing through the order. Suárez minimized the damage to his lead by finishing second, with Bettino coming home third. Stang continued his form on the next day, quickly dispatching polesitter Baztarrica and winning the second race. Chíalvo and Traverso completed the rostrum, with Suárez failing to finish the race. With dropped scores now coming into play, Stang entered the final round ten points ahead of Suárez.

The final round of the year saw the series return to Alta Gracia. Stang began the weekend by clinching pole position ahead of Suárez, growing his lead to twelve points. Suárez, undeterred by that, started the first race in seventh and methodically worked his way up the order to win the encounter. Stang could only move up to fifth from eighth on the grid, setting up a brilliant final with the two drivers separated by a single point. Stang had pole position, but through the race Suárez managed to overhaul him to take the victory and secure the title by just six points. Massa came third, in the final race and also in the championship.

Many were surprised by Stang electing to return to the series after coming second in 2022, and he was instantly a favorite for the title. And while he took the most wins across the year, the championship did not go to plan. Suárez, also returning after coming fourth in 2022, thwarted Stang's plans, being right on his pace from the get-go and narrowly stealing the title away from him.

== Championship standings ==
=== Scoring system ===
Every driver taking part in qualifying or in one of the two races of a weekend and setting a time was awarded five points.

==== Qualifying points ====
Each qualifying session awarded one point to the fastest driver. Afterwards, the five fastest drivers took part in the "super qualifying" session, each setting one lap to set the top five positions. These five drivers were also awarded points:

Position in qualifying / **1st**; Points / 1	Position in super qualifying / **1st** / **2nd** / **3rd** / **4th** / **5th**; Points / 5 / 4 / 3 / 2 / 1

==== Race points ====
Position	**1st**	**2nd**	**3rd**	**4th**	**5th**	**6th**	**7th**	**8th**	**9th**	**10th**	**11th**	**12th**	**13th**	**14th**	**15th**
Points	25	20	17	15	13	11	9	8	7	6	5	4	3	2	1

The two worst weekends points-wise of each driver were dropped. Rounds where a driver was excluded from a race were not allowed to be dropped.

=== Drivers' Championship ===
Pos	Driver	BUE1 (Argentina)		RAF (Argentina)		COR1 (Argentina)		SNI1 (Argentina)		SJG (Argentina)		SNI2 (Argentina)		LRJ (Argentina)		RCU (Argentina)		NDJ (Argentina)		BUE2 (Argentina)		PAR (Argentina)		COR2 (Argentina)		Pts
Pos	Driver	R1	R2	R1	R2	R1	R2	R1	R2	R1	R2	R1	R2	R1	R2	R1	R2	R1	R2	R1	R2	R1	R2	R1	R2	Pts
1	(Argentina) Nicolás Suárez	4	2^{3}	1	5*^{3}	7	**3**^{1}	1	3^{3}	1	**2***^{1}	1	6^{3}	2	1*^{2}	(7)	(9^{4})	3	2^{4}	5	**2***^{1}	(2)	(10†^{3})	1	1^{2}	478
2	(Argentina) Emiliano Stang	5	**1***^{1}	2	**10**^{1}	2	2*^{2}	EX	1*^{2}	(10)	(3^{5})	2	**1***^{1}	(6)	(3^{4})	1	7*^{2}	7	**1***^{1}	2	1^{2}	1	1^{2}	5	**2***^{1}	472
3	(Argentina) Brian Massa	(DNS)	(DNS^{2})	3	Ret^{2}	1	1^{3}	6	**2**^{1}	12	1^{2}	4	4^{2}	3	**7**^{1}	2	**EX**^{1}	1	3^{5}	Ret	6^{5}	(Ret)	(Ret)	4	3^{4}	372
4	(Argentina) Martin Chíalvo	6	4	6	EX^{5}	4	6	(9)	(9)	9	4^{3}	5	7	(Ret)	(5)	4	5	4	6^{2}	3	3^{3}	12	2^{5}	2	4	316
5	(Argentina) Andrés Brion	3	6	5	2	(12)	(Ret)	3	10	6	11	Ret	3^{5}	1	2^{3}	3	2^{3}	(Ret)	(Ret)	11	11	7	EX^{4}	8	7	294
6	(Argentina) Juan Pablo Traverso	2	3^{5}	11	1	8	7	2	5^{4}	(DNS)	(7)	3	8	5	8	EX	3^{5}	8	7	(10)	(8)	13†	3	7	9	287
7	(Argentina) Santiago Chiarello			7	3	3	5	Ret	4^{5}	3	10	Ret	2^{4}	4	4^{5}	5	4	5	Ret	8	9	(9)	(Ret)	Ret	Ret^{3}	256
8	(Argentina) Santiago Baztarrica	(Ret)	(DNS)	9	9	6	10	4	Ret	5	5^{4}	6	5	8	6			Ret	5	6	4^{4}	5	**Ret***^{1}	6	5	251
9	(Argentina) Thiago Bettino	(Ret)	(7)	10	6	10	9	7	6	7	9	7	Ret			9	1	Ret	4^{3}	1	14†	3	6	3	Ret^{5}	248
10	(Chile) Giovanni Ramirez Pino	(Ret)	(8)	12	4	5	8^{5}	(Ret)	(8)	8	12	8	9	7	9	6	6	2	8	4	7	8	7	10	12†	235
11	(Uruguay) Gastón Irazú	(Ret)	(DNS)	Ret	7	13	13	5	7	4	8	(11)	(Ret)	9	10	Ret	EX	Ret	10	7	5	4	4	Ret	6	192
12	(Argentina) Facundo Gutiérrez	7	9	8	8	14	11	EX	Ret	(DNS)	(14†)	9	10	11	12	8	Ret	6	9	(Ret)	(10)	11	8	11	10	161
13	(Argentina) Valentina Funes	8	10	13	11			8	11			10	11	10	11	10	10	Ret	EX	12	12	10	9	Ret	11	145
14	(Panama) Sebastián Ng	1	5^{4}	4	Ret^{4}	9	4^{4}			2	6															132
15	(Peru) Daniella Ore													12	Ret	11	8	Ret	11	9	13	6	5	9	8	101
16	(Argentina) Aixa Franke					11	12			11	13															27
Pos	Driver	R1	R2	R1	R2	R1	R2	R1	R2	R1	R2	R1	R2	R1	R2	R1	R2	R1	R2	R1	R2	R1	R2	R1	R2	Pts
Pos	Driver	BUE1 (Argentina)		RAF (Argentina)		COR1 (Argentina)		SNI1 (Argentina)		SJG (Argentina)		SNI2 (Argentina)		LRJ (Argentina)		RCU (Argentina)		NDJ (Argentina)		BUE2 (Argentina)		PAR (Argentina)		COR2 (Argentina)		Pts

Colour	Result
Gold	Winner
Silver	Second place
Bronze	Third place
Green	Points classification
Blue	Non-points classification
Blue	Non-classified finish (NC)
Purple	Retired, not classified (Ret)
Red	Did not qualify (DNQ)
Red	Did not pre-qualify (DNPQ)
Black	Disqualified (DSQ)
White	Did not start (DNS)
White	Withdrew (WD)
White	Race cancelled (C)
Blank	Did not practice (DNP)
Blank	Did not arrive (DNA)
Blank	Excluded (EX)

**Bold** – Pole

Italics – Fastest Lap

* – fastest in qualifying

^{1 2 3 4 5} – super qualifying positions

=== Teams' Championship ===
Pos	Team	Points
1	Gabriel Werner Competición	891
2	Martinez Competición	782
3	LR Team	574
4	Aimar Motorsports	557
5	Gabriel Werner Junior	329
6	Esteban Sport Group Formula	243
7	Etchamendi Sport	187
8	LFB Racing Team	9
