= 2023 TC2000 Championship =

45th season of Turismo Competición 2000

The 2023 TC2000 Championship was the 45th season of Turismo Competición 2000, the premier touring car category of Argentina.

== Calendar ==
Round	Circuit	Date	Map
1	Autódromo Oscar y Juan Gálvez (Layout #8), Buenos Aires	February 26	2023 TC2000 Championship is located in Argentina
2	(Santa Fe Province) Autódromo Ciudad de Rafaela, Rafaela	March 19	2023 TC2000 Championship is located in Argentina
3	(Córdoba Province, Argentina) Autódromo Oscar Cabalén, Alta Gracia	April 23	2023 TC2000 Championship is located in Argentina
4	(Santa Fe Province) Autódromo Municipal Juan Manuel Fangio, Rosario	May 14	2023 TC2000 Championship is located in Argentina
5	(Santa Fe Province) Autódromo Parque de la Velocidad de San Jorge, San Jorge	June 4	2023 TC2000 Championship is located in Argentina
6	(Buenos Aires Province) Autódromo Juan María Traverso, San Nicolás	June 25	2023 TC2000 Championship is located in Argentina
7	(La Rioja Province, Argentina) Autódromo Ciudad de La Rioja, La Rioja	July 16	2023 TC2000 Championship is located in Argentina
8	(Córdoba Province, Argentina) Autódromo Parque Ciudad de Río Cuarto, Río Cuarto	August 6	2023 TC2000 Championship is located in Argentina
9	(Buenos Aires Province) Autódromo Ciudad de Nueve de Julio - Guillermo Yoyo Maldonado, Nueve de Julio	September 10	2023 TC2000 Championship is located in Argentina
10	Autódromo Oscar y Juan Gálvez (Layout #8), Buenos Aires	October 8	2023 TC2000 Championship is located in Argentina
11	(Entre Ríos Province) Autódromo Ciudad de Paraná, Paraná	November 5	2023 TC2000 Championship is located in Argentina
12	(Córdoba Province, Argentina) Autódromo Oscar Cabalén, Alta Gracia	November 26	2023 TC2000 Championship is located in Argentina

== Teams and drivers ==
Teams and drivers who have participated in at least one race of the season.

Manufacturer	Car	Entrant (Commercial title)	#	Driver	Rounds	Co-driver (200 km)
Chevrolet	Cruze J400	Pro Racing (YPF Elaion Auro Pro Racing)	37	(Uruguay) Rodrigo Aramendia	All	(Argentina) Lucas Colombo Russell
Chevrolet	Cruze J400	Pro Racing (YPF Elaion Auro Pro Racing)	57	(Argentina) Franco Vivian	All	(Argentina) Matías Milla
Chevrolet	Cruze J400	Pro Racing (YPF Elaion Auro Pro Racing)	90	(Argentina) Néstor Girolami	10	(Brazil) Ricardo Maurício
Chevrolet	Cruze J400	JM Motorsport	67	(Argentina) Nicolás Traut	1–7, 9–12	(Argentina) Figgo Bessone
Chevrolet	Cruze J400	M y R Racing Team	78	(Argentina) Franco Riva	10–13	(Argentina) Juan Pablo Bessone
Citroën	C4 X Mk.3	SDE San Juan	71	(Argentina) Fabricio Persia	3–8, 9–12	(Argentina) Ariel Persia
Honda	Civic Mk.11	RV Racing (YPF Honda RV Racing Team)	10	(Argentina) Bernardo Llaver	All	(Brazil) Cacá Bueno
Honda	Civic Mk.11	RV Racing (YPF Honda RV Racing Team)	42	(Argentina) Javier Scuncio Moro	All	(Chile) Martín Scuncio Moro
Honda	Civic Mk.11	RV Racing (YPF Honda RV Racing Team)	52	(Uruguay) Cyro Fontes	1–3	—
Honda	Civic Mk.11	RV Racing (YPF Honda RV Racing Team)	52	(Argentina) Mario Valle	4, 6–8	—
Honda	Civic Mk.11	RV Racing (YPF Honda RV Racing Team)	83	(Argentina) Facundo Ardusso	All	(Argentina) Ricardo Risatti
Fiat	Cronos	Octanos Competición	25	(Argentina) Marcelo Ciarrocchi	3–12	(Uruguay) Michell Bonnin
Fiat	Cronos	Octanos Competición	29	(Argentina) Facundo Aldrighetti	1–2	—
Fiat	Cronos	Octanos Competición	34	(Argentina) Luis José di Palma	All	(Brazil) Raphael Teixeira
Renault	Fluence	Ambrogio Racing (Axion Energy Sport)	1	(Argentina) Leonel Pernía	1–3, 5–12	(Argentina) Antonino García
Renault	Fluence	Ambrogio Racing (Axion Energy Sport)	17	(Chile) Felipe Barrios Bustos	All	(Argentina) Carlos Javier Merlo
Renault	Fluence	Ambrogio Racing (Axion Energy Sport)	23	(Argentina) Ignacio Montenegro	All	(Argentina) Exequiel Bastidas
Renault	Fluence	Ambrogio Racing (Axion Energy Sport)	77	(Argentina) Mariano Pernía	3–12	(Argentina) Matías Capurro
Renault	Fluence	Ambrogio Racing (Axion Energy Sport)	88	(Argentina) Facundo Marques	All	(Argentina) Damián Fineschi
Toyota	Corolla E210	Toyota Gazoo Racing Argentina (Toyota Gazoo Racing YPF Infinia)	7	(Argentina) Isidoro Vezzaro	1	—
Toyota	Corolla E210	Toyota Gazoo Racing Argentina (Toyota Gazoo Racing YPF Infinia)	29	(Argentina) Facundo Aldrighetti	3–12	(Brazil) Nelson Piquet Jr.
Toyota	Corolla E210	Toyota Gazoo Racing Argentina (Toyota Gazoo Racing YPF Infinia)	55	(Uruguay) Gonzalo Reilly	10	(Paraguay) Miguel María García
Toyota	Corolla E210	Toyota Gazoo Racing Argentina (Toyota Gazoo Racing YPF Infinia)	61	(Argentina) Lucas Bohdanowicz	1–3	—
Toyota	Corolla E210	Toyota Gazoo Racing Argentina (Toyota Gazoo Racing YPF Infinia)	68	(Argentina) Julián Santero	1–12	(Argentina) Matías Rossi

== Results and standings ==
=== Results summary ===
Round			Pole position	Fastest lap	Winning driver	Winning team	Winning car	Source
1	R1	Buenos Aires 1	(Argentina) Bernardo Llaver	(Argentina) Facundo Marques	(Argentina) Franco Vivian	Pro Racing	Chevrolet Cruze J400	
1	R2	Buenos Aires 1	—	(Argentina) Julián Santero	(Argentina) Leonel Pernía	Ambrogio Racing	Renault Fluence	
2		Rafaela	(Argentina) Leonel Pernía	(Argentina) Facundo Ardusso	(Argentina) Facundo Ardusso	RV Racing	Honda Civic Mk.11	
3	R1	Alta Gracia 1	(Argentina) Leonel Pernía	(Argentina) Franco Vivian	(Argentina) Ignacio Montenegro	Ambrogio Racing	Renault Fluence	
3	R2	Alta Gracia 1	—	(Argentina) Leonel Pernía	(Argentina) Leonel Pernía	Ambrogio Racing	Renault Fluence	
4	R1	Rosario	(Argentina) Franco Vivian	(Argentina) Ignacio Montenegro	(Argentina) Ignacio Montenegro	Ambrogio Racing	Renault Fluence	
4	R2	Rosario	—	(Argentina) Franco Vivian	(Argentina) Julián Santero	Toyota Gazoo Racing Argentina	Toyota Corolla E210	
5	R1	San Jorge	(Argentina) Facundo Marques	(Argentina) Facundo Marques	(Argentina) Facundo Marques	Ambrogio Racing	Renault Fluence	
5	R2	San Jorge	—	(Argentina) Leonel Pernía	(Argentina) Leonel Pernía	Ambrogio Racing	Renault Fluence	
6	R1	San Nicolás	(Argentina) Facundo Marques	(Argentina) Facundo Marques	(Argentina) Facundo Marques	Ambrogio Racing	Renault Fluence	
6	R2	San Nicolás	—	(Argentina) Franco Vivian	(Argentina) Franco Vivian	Pro Racing	Chevrolet Cruze J400	
7	R1	La Rioja	(Argentina) Mariano Pernía	(Argentina) Julián Santero	(Argentina) Mariano Pernía	Ambrogio Racing	Renault Fluence	
7	R2	La Rioja	—	(Argentina) Leonel Pernía	(Argentina) Leonel Pernía	Ambrogio Racing	Renault Fluence	
8	R1	Río Cuarto	(Argentina) Mariano Pernía	(Argentina) Facundo Marques	(Argentina) Facundo Marques	Ambrogio Racing	Renault Fluence	
8	R2	Río Cuarto	—	(Argentina) Leonel Pernía	(Argentina) Leonel Pernía	Ambrogio Racing	Renault Fluence	
9	R1	Nueve de Julio	(Argentina) Facundo Ardusso	(Argentina) Facundo Aldrighetti	(Argentina) Bernardo Llaver	RV Racing	Honda Civic Mk.11	
9	R2	Nueve de Julio	—	(Argentina) Leonel Pernía	(Argentina) Leonel Pernía	Ambrogio Racing	Renault Fluence	
10		Buenos Aires 2	(Argentina) Leonel Pernía (Argentina) Antonino García	(Argentina) Franco Vivian	(Argentina) Leonel Pernía (Argentina) Antonino García	Ambrogio Racing	Renault Fluence	
11	R1	Paraná	(Argentina) Ignacio Montenegro	(Argentina) Ignacio Montenegro	(Argentina) Ignacio Montenegro	Ambrogio Racing	Renault Fluence	
11	R2	Paraná	—	(Argentina) Leonel Pernía	(Argentina) Julián Santero	Toyota Gazoo Racing Argentina	Toyota Corolla E210	
12		Alta Gracia 2	(Argentina) Mariano Pernía	(Argentina) Ignacio Montenegro	(Argentina) Ignacio Montenegro	Ambrogio Racing	Renault Fluence	

=== Championship standings ===
Points system

Posición	1st	2nd	3rd	4th	5th	6th	7th	8th	9th	10th	11th	12th	13th	14th	15th
Qualification	3	2	1												
Race 1	20	15	12	10	8	6	4	3	2	1					
Race 2	25	21	18	14	10	7	5	4	3	1					
Single race weekend	40	32	26	20	15	10	6	4	2	1					
200 km sprint	15	12	10	8	6	5	4	3	2	1					
200 km race	45	39	34	30	26	22	18	14	10	8	6	4	3	2	1

Drivers' championship

Pos.	Driver	BUE1 (Buenos Aires)		RAF (Santa Fe Province)	AGC1 (Córdoba Province, Argentina)		ROS (Santa Fe Province)		SJG (Santa Fe Province)		SNA (Buenos Aires Province)		LRJ (La Rioja Province, Argentina)		RCU (Córdoba Province, Argentina)		NDJ (Buenos Aires Province)		BUE2 (Buenos Aires)	PAR (Entre Ríos Province)		AGC2 (Córdoba Province, Argentina)	Total
1	(Argentina) Leonel Pernía	3	1	2	2	1	INJ	INJ	7	1	EX	4	3	1	2	1	3	1	1	7	2	3	370
2	(Argentina) Julián Santero	5	2	Ret	6	2	4	1	12	6	5	Ret	2	2	4	3	4	2	Ret	2	1	4	263
3	(Argentina) Ignacio Montenegro	4	6	3	1	3	1	7	5	4	7	3	6	Ret	Ret	9	8	13	Ret	1	3	1	255
4	(Argentina) Facundo Marques	10	3	8	9	8	5	2	1	5	1	7	15	10	1	2	10	6	2	6	6	6	230
5	(Argentina) Facundo Ardusso	DSQ	7	1	Ret	5	2	5	4	3	4	2	7	11	5	4	11	5	5	3	13	5	225
6	(Argentina) Franco Vivian	1	4	Ret	7	4	3	3	2	2	3	1	8	8	3	6	9	10	9	10	5	Ret	217
7	(Argentina) Bernardo Llaver	2	5	Ret	5	7	DSQ	8	8	12	6	8	4	5	7	5	1	3	4	4	7	7	192
8	(Argentina) Mariano Pernía				4	6	Ret	DNS	3	Ret	EX	6	1	3	Ret	8	7	7	6	5	4	2	169
9	(Argentina) Facundo Aldrighetti	9	12	9	3	9	Ret	DNS	10	11	2	5	10	7	9	Ret	2	Ret	3	11	8	11	105
10	(Argentina) Luis José Di Palma	Ret	8	10	15	16	Ret	4	Ret	7	12	13	16	Ret	11	7	5	4	Ret	8	Ret	10	61
11	(Argentina) Javier Scuncio Moro	6	11	6	14	14	Ret	DNS	11	13	10	9	Ret	6	EX	11	6	8	Ret	9	12	8	41
12	(Argentina) Marcelo Ciarrocchi				12	Ret	Ret	Ret	6	9	14	Ret	5	4	8	Ret	12	9	Ret	15	11	12	37
13	(Argentina) Fabricio Persia				13	10	7	6	Ret	8	9	11	13	EX	Ret	14			7	14	14	Ret	36
14	(Uruguay) Rodrigo Aramendía	7	9	Ret	8	11	6	10	9	Ret	13	10	9	Ret	6	12	Ret	DNS	Ret	13	9	15	34
15	(Chile) Felipe Barrios Bustos	DSQ	DNS	5	10	13	8	9	DNS	10	11	14	12	12	10	10	Ret	11	Ret	DNS	DNS	9	28
16	(Argentina) Néstor Girolami																		Ret				23
17	(Argentina) Lucas Bohdanowicz	12	10	4	11	17																	21
18	(Argentina) Nicolás Traut	8	13	Ret	Ret	15	9	Ret	13	Ret	EX	Ret	14	Ret			13	12	8	16	Ret	14	19
19	(Uruguay) Cyro Fontes	11	Ret	7	Ret	12																	6
20	(Argentina) Mario Valle						DSQ	EX			8	12	11	9	EX	13							6
21	(Uruguay) Gonzalo Reilly																		Ret				3
22	(Argentina) Franco Riva																		Ret	12	10	13	1
NC	(Argentina) Isidoro Vezzaro	Ret	Ret																				0
Guest drivers ineligible for championship points
	(Argentina) Antonino García																		1				
	(Argentina) Damián Fineschi																		2				
	(Brazil) Nelson Piquet Jr.																		3				
	(Brazil) Cacá Bueno																		4				
	(Argentina) Ricardo Risatti																		5				
	(Argentina) Matías Capurro																		6				
	(Argentina) Ariel Persia																		7				
	(Argentina) Figgo Bessone																		8				
	(Argentina) Matías Milla																		9				
	(Brazil) Ricardo Maurício																		Ret				
	(Brazil) Raphael Teixeira																		Ret				
	(Argentina) Matías Rossi																		Ret				
	(Paraguay) Miguel María García																		Ret				
	(Argentina) Lucas Colombo Russell																		Ret				
	(Argentina) Carlos Javier Merlo																		Ret				
	(Chile) Martín Scuncio Moro																		Ret				
	(Uruguay) Michell Bonnin																		Ret				
	(Argentina) Exequiel Bastidas																		Ret				
	(Argentina) Juan Pablo Bessone																		Ret				
Pos.	Driver	BUE1 (Buenos Aires)		RAF (Santa Fe Province)	AGC1 (Córdoba Province, Argentina)		ROS (Santa Fe Province)		SJG (Santa Fe Province)		SNA (Buenos Aires Province)		LRJ (La Rioja Province, Argentina)		RCU (Córdoba Province, Argentina)		NDJ (Buenos Aires Province)		BUE2 (Buenos Aires)	PAR (Entre Ríos Province)		AGC2 (Córdoba Province, Argentina)	Total
