= Dudignac =

- Town
- Location within Buenos Aires Province
- Coordinates: 35°39′S 60°44′W
- Country: Argentina
- Province: Buenos Aires
- Partidos: Nueve de Julio
- Established: June 8, 1911
- Elevation: 81 m (266 ft)

Population (2001 Census)
  - Total: 2,542
- Time zone: UTC−3 (ART)
- CPA Base: B 6505
- Area code: +291 457-XXXX
- Climate: Dfc

Dudignac is a town located in the southern portion of the Nueve de Julio Partido in the province of Buenos Aires, Argentina.

== Geography ==
Dudignac is located just outside Provincial Route 65, the main route into the town.

== History ==
Dudignac was officially founded on June 8, 1911, following the construction of a railway station, by Exequiel Dudignac, who the town is named after. Land in the town was first sold later in the year. The initial town plan called for the construction of 84 blocks in the town. Dudignac became the town's delegate, a position which he held until his death in 1915.

== Economy ==
The town has a significant agricultural presence, in addition to significant metalworking industries, particularly the production and manufacturing of stainless steel.

== Population ==
Dudignac had a population of 2,542 as of the 2001 census.
