= Autódromo Ciudad de Nueve de Julio - Guillermo Yoyo Maldonado =

Circuit in Nueve de Julio, Argentina

- Full Circuit (1970–present)
- Location: Nueve de Julio, Buenos Aires Province, Argentina
- Coordinates: 35°26′05″S 60°54′48″W
- Owner: Municipality of Nueve de Julio
- Opened: 26 July 1970; 55 years ago
- Former names: Autódromo Ciudad de Nueve de Julio (July 1970–July 2020)
- Major events: Former: TC2000 (1989–1991, 1993, 1996–1997, 2023, 2025); Top Race V6 (1997, 2000–2001, 2008–2009, 2013, 2016, 2019, 2023, 2025); Turismo Carretera (1979, 1982–1985, 1987–1990, 1992, 1995–2010); TC Mouras (2007–2013); Turismo Nacional (1978, 1984, 1986–1987, 1997)

Full Circuit (1970–present)
- Length: 4.649 km (2.889 mi)
- Turns: 10
- Race lap record: 1:31.372 ( (Argentina) Franco Vivian, Chevrolet Tracker, 2025, TC2000)

Short Circuit (1970–present)
- Length: 3.428 km (2.130 mi)
- Turns: 7
- Race lap record: 1:16.210 ( (Argentina) Emiliano Stang, Tito F4-A, 2023, FR 2.0)

Autódromo Ciudad de Nueve de Julio - Guillermo Yoyo Maldonado is a 4.649 km (2.889 mi) circuit located in Nueve de Julio, Argentina. It has hosted national events, such as TC2000 Championship, Top Race V6 and Turismo Nacional. On the 50th anniversary of circuit, the circuit was renamed as Autódromo Ciudad de Nueve de Julio - Guillermo Yoyo Maldonado as a tribute for native racing driver Guillermo Yoyo Maldonado.

== Lap records ==
As of July 2025, the fastest official race lap records at the Autódromo Ciudad de Nueve de Julio - Guillermo Yoyo Maldonado are listed as:

Category	Time	Driver	Vehicle	Event
Full Circuit (1970–present): 4.649 km (2.889 mi)
TC2000	1:31.372	Franco Vivian	Chevrolet Tracker	2025 Nueve de Julio TC2000 round
Turismo Carretera	1:32.348	Juan Marcos Angelini	Dodge Cherokee	2010 Nueve de Julio Turismo Carretera round
Formula Renault 2.0	1:38.879	Tomás Campra	Tito F4-A	2025 Nueve de Julio Fórmula Nacional Argentina round
Short Circuit (1970–present): 3.428 km (2.130 mi)
Formula Renault 2.0	1:16.210	Emiliano Stang	Tito F4-A	2023 Nueve de Julio Fórmula Nacional Argentina round
