= Autódromo de Benguela =

Circuit

Autódromo Internacional de Benguela
- Full Circuit (1972–1976)
- Location: Benguela, Angola
- Coordinates: 12°36′3.73″S 13°23′2.87″E
- Broke ground: December 1971; 54 years ago
- Opened: 21 May 1972; 53 years ago
- Closed: 1976

Full Circuit (1972–1976)
- Length: 3.958 km (2.459 mi)
- Turns: 10

Short Circuit (1972–1976)
- Length: 2.774 km (1.724 mi)
- Turns: 9

Autódromo de Benguela was a race track located in Benguela, Angola.

== History ==
Autódromo de Benguela was located west of the Benguela airport, about 800 m (2,600 ft) away from the Atlantic Ocean. The circuit was designed to replace Circuito da Praia Morena, a street circuit in downtown Benguela that had been used for sports car racing since the 1960s. The Autódromo de Benguela was opened on 21 May 1972—one week before the Autódromo de Luanda in Angola's capital—after six months of construction. At that time, only the race track itself had been completed; unlike in Luanda, there was no pit lane or grandstands.

In the following two years, the Autódromo de Benguela was mainly used for some endurance races in the Angolan sports car series. These were the Benguela 500 km races in 1973 and 1974, the first winners being Mário de Araújo Cabral and Antonío Peixinho.

After the Carnation Revolution in Angola's mother country Portugal in 1974, the resulting independence of the African country and the civil war that broke out at the same time, motor sport in Angola initially came to a standstill at the end of 1974. Unlike in Luanda, however, there were still a few races in Benguela in the following years; at least one sports car race is documented for 1976.

The facility subsequently fell into disrepair, and over the years there were only a few privately organised motor sport events. In 1996, for example, a privately organised race took place on the occasion of the 379th anniversary of the city of Benguela, in which several Porsche 911s, a Peugeot 205 and a VW Corrado competed against each other.

There is—apart from an isolated note about a motorbike race that is said to have taken place on the track as late as 2001—no evidence that the track was still in intended use in the 21st century. The Autódromo de Benguela has been in a dilapidated state since at least 2005.

== Layout ==
The course was 3.958 km (2.459 mi) long. It consisted of a long straight and a three-part, uniform combination of curves. A short version of the track could also be used, its length was 2.774 km (1.724 mi).
