= Autodrómo Internacional de Las Américas =

Paved racing circuit in the Dominican Republic

- Location: Santo Domingo, Dominican Republic
- Coordinates: 18°28′7″N 69°44′53″W
- Capacity: 15,000
- Opened: 1998
- Architect: Dr. Ing. Ludovino Fernández Fernández
- Major events: Grand-Am Cup Miller Grand-Am Cup 200 (2005); American GT Series (2004); Campeonato Centroamericano (2009)
- Website: http://www.autodromosunix.com/
- Surface: Asphalt
- Length: 2.664 km (1.655 mi)
- Turns: 11

Autodrómo Internacional de Las Américas is a paved circuit built in 1998, located near the capital city of the Dominican Republic, Santo Domingo Este. While only an 11 turn, 2.664 km (1.655 mi) road course, it is considered to be highly challenging as well as equally rewarding. The circuit is on the Caribbean Coast, which can be seen just behind Turn One.

== History ==
In 2005, the circuit played host to the Second Round of the Grand-Am Cup (now Michelin Pilot Challenge), the Miller Grand-Am Cup 200. It is currently used as a local proving grounds for the best of Caribbean talent, through weekly races and almost a day-by-day usage in race-training purposes.

== Racing ==
=== Miller Grand-Am Cup 200 [GS Class Only] Results ===
Pos	No.	Class	Class Pos.	Driver	Team/Car	Laps	Best Lap	On Lap
1	96	GS	1	Marks/ Auberlen	Turner Motorsport / BMW M3	111	01:24.454	4
2	05	GS	2	Jeannette/ Gue	Multimatic Motorsports / Mustang	111	01:24.436	7
3	11	GS	3	Knowles/ Powell	Powell Motorsport / Cadillac CTS-V	111	01:25.903	2
4	60	GS	4	Finlay/ McDowell	Finlay Motorsports / BMW M3	110	01:23.836	3
5	09	GS	5	Russell/ Thornton/ Riddle	Automatic Racing / BMW M3	110	01:24.783	6
6	6	GS	6	McCalmont/ Law	Zoom Motorsports / Porsche 996	110	01:25.299	7
7	16	GS	7	Wortzman/ Wilden	Zoom Motorsports / BMW M3	110	01:25.410	4
8	37	GS	8	B Seafuse/ J Seafuse	JBS Motorsports / Mustang GT	110	01:25.898	11
9	55	GS	9	Maxwell/ Empringham	Multimatic Motorsports / Mustang	110	01:24.908	5
10	9	GS	10	J Sandridge/ M Sandridge/ Varde	Team Salad Racing / BMW M3	110	01:25.905	11
11	44	GS	11	Wi Nonnamaker/ Gonzalez Jr	Team Sahlen / Porsche 996	110	01:26.120	3
12	31	GS	12	Ellis/ Bavaro	Bodymotion Racing / Porsche 997	110	01:26.539	5
13	18	GS	13	Pickett/ Lally/ Pumpelly	Race Prep Motorsports / Porsche 996	109	01:25.944	3
14	93	GS	14	Foster/ Skelton	Anchor Racing / BMW M3	109	01:24.671	22
15	43	GS	15	Murry/ Rosser	Team Sahlen / Porsche 996	109	01:26.383	5
16	81	GS	16	Martini/ Collins	Synergy Racing / Porsche 997	109	01:26.386	3
17	5	GS	17	James/ Nastasi	Blackforest Motorsports / Mustang GT	109	01:24.861	4
18	79	GS	18	M Sandridge/ J Sandridge/ Ham	Team Salad Racing / Cadillac CTS-V	109	01:26.385	2
19	89	GS	19	Grande/ Fox/ Wellon	LNS Motorsports / Porsche 996	108	01:25.954	3
20	40	GS	20	Wa Nonnamaker/ J Nonnamaker	Team Sahlen / Porsche 996	108	01:26.301	7
21	90	GS	21	Wilson/ Riddle/ Thornton	Automatic Racing / BMW M3	108	01:25.027	5
22	42	GS	22	Sahlen/ Wi Nonnamaker/ Wa Nonnamaker	Team Sahlen / Porsche 996	108	01:26.793	4
23	28	GS	23	Lally/ Gaffney/ Pickett	Race Prep Motorsports / Porsche 996	108	01:26.263	9
24	52	GS	24	Ackley/ Rehagen	Rehagen Racing / Mustang Cobra SVT	107	01:26.819	14
25	07	GS	25	Guindon/ Camirand	Powell Motorsport / Cadillac CTS-V	107	01:25.710	3
26	88	GS	26	Ellis/ Rossi	Knobel Racing / Porsche 996	106	01:26.482	2
27	47	GS	27	Smith/ Kohler/ DeFontes	TF Racing / Mustang	105	01:27.195	6
28	69	GS	28	Krohn/ Jonsson	Krohn Racing/ TRG / Porsche 996	104	01:26.582	4
29	41	GS	29	Levy/ Alvarez	Team Sahlen / Porsche 996	92	01:26.715	3
30	58	GS	30	Martin/ MacAlpine	Rehagen Racing / Mustang Cobra SVT	89	01:24.704	3
31	99	GS	31	Hainer/ Said	Anchor Racing / BMW M3	80	01:24.922	3
32	78	GS	32	R Lopez/ J Lopez/ Pickett	Race Prep Motorsports / Porsche 996	71	01:26.911	22
33	38	GS	33	Plummer/ Cosmo	BGB Motorsports / Porsche 996	68	01:25.958	4
34	92	GS	34	Munson/ Sofronas	Anchor Racing / BMW M3	18	01:27.059	0
35	17	GS	35	Wilkins/ Lacey	Doncaster Racing / Porsche 996	13	01:26.664	0
