= Renault Fluence =

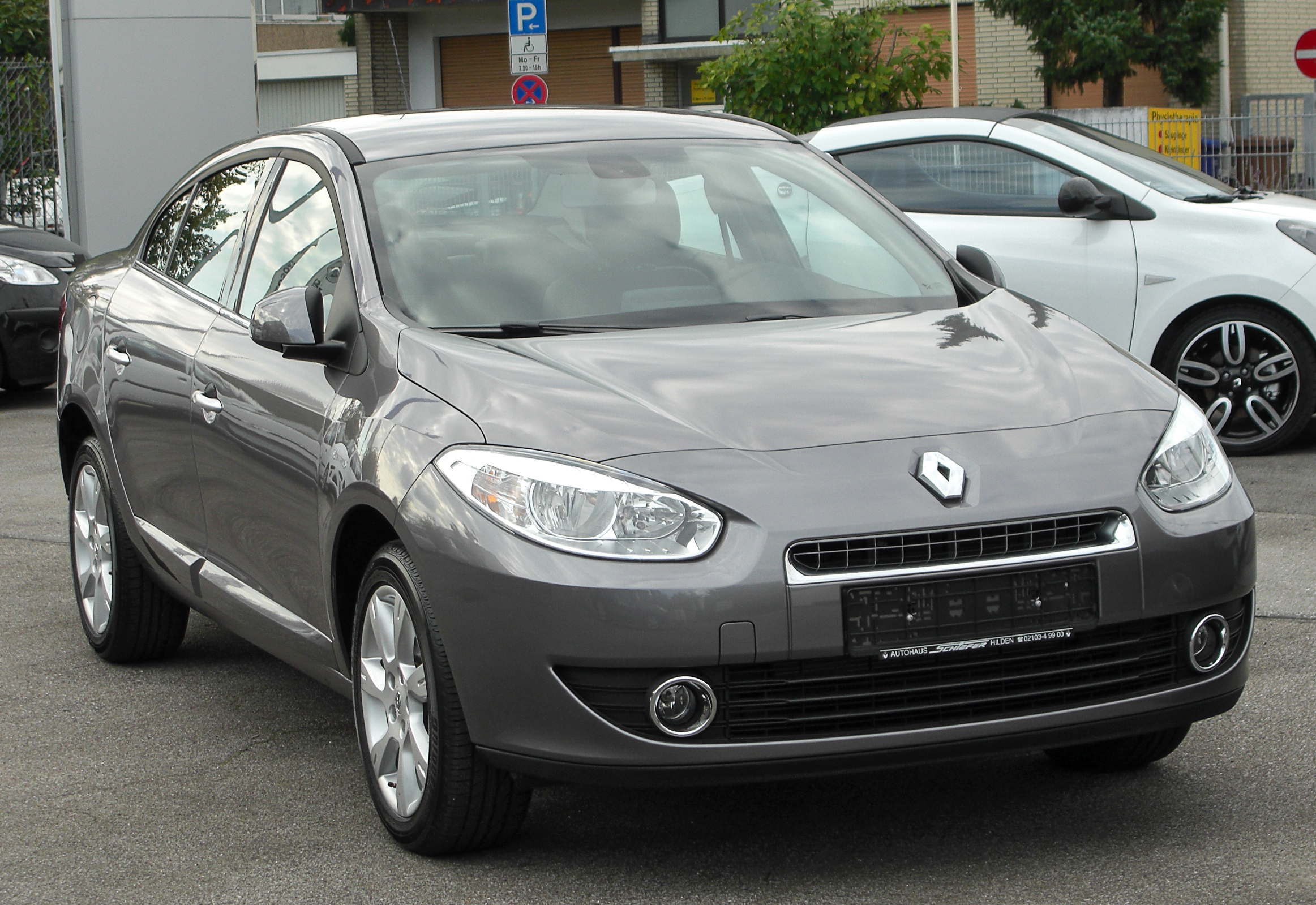

Overview
- Manufacturer: Renault
- Model code: X38
- Also called: Renault Samsung SM3 (South Korea)
- Production: 2009–2015 (Europe); 2009–2020; 2010–2019 (Argentina); 2011–2017 (India)
- Assembly: Argentina: Santa Isabel (Renault Argentina); India: Chennai (Renault Nissan India, until 2017); Malaysia: Kuala Lumpur (TCMA); Russia: Moscow (Renault Russia); South Korea: Busan (Renault Samsung); Turkey: Bursa (Oyak-Renault)

Body and chassis
- Class: Small family car
- Body style: 4-door saloon
- Layout: Front-engine, front-wheel-drive
- Platform: Renault–Nissan C platform
- Related: Renault Mégane III

Powertrain
- Engine: Petrol: 1.6 L K4M I4; 1.6 L H4M I4; 2.0 L M4R I4; 2.0 L F4RT I4 turbo (GT); Diesel: 1.5 L K9K dCi I4 turbo; 1.6 L R9M dCi I4 turbo
- Transmission: 5/6-speed manual 4-speed automatic (BVA); 6-speed Getrag EDC; Nissan/Jatco CVT (X-Tronic)

Dimensions
- Wheelbase: 2,702 mm (106.4 in)
- Length: 4,618 mm (181.8 in)
- Width: 1,809 mm (71.2 in)
- Height: 1,478 mm (58.2 in)
- Curb weight: 1,225–1,277 kg (2,701–2,815 lb)

Chronology
- Predecessor: Renault Mégane II (saloon)
- Successor: Renault Mégane IV (saloon; in European markets)

The Renault Fluence is a compact sedan produced by the French automaker Renault. The car was produced until 2016 at the Oyak-Renault plant in Bursa, Turkey. It was produced until the end of 2018 in Santa Isabel, Argentina, for the Latin American market.

On 12 July 2016, Renault unveiled the successor to the Fluence, initially for the market of Europe, the Mégane Sedan IV.

== Design ==
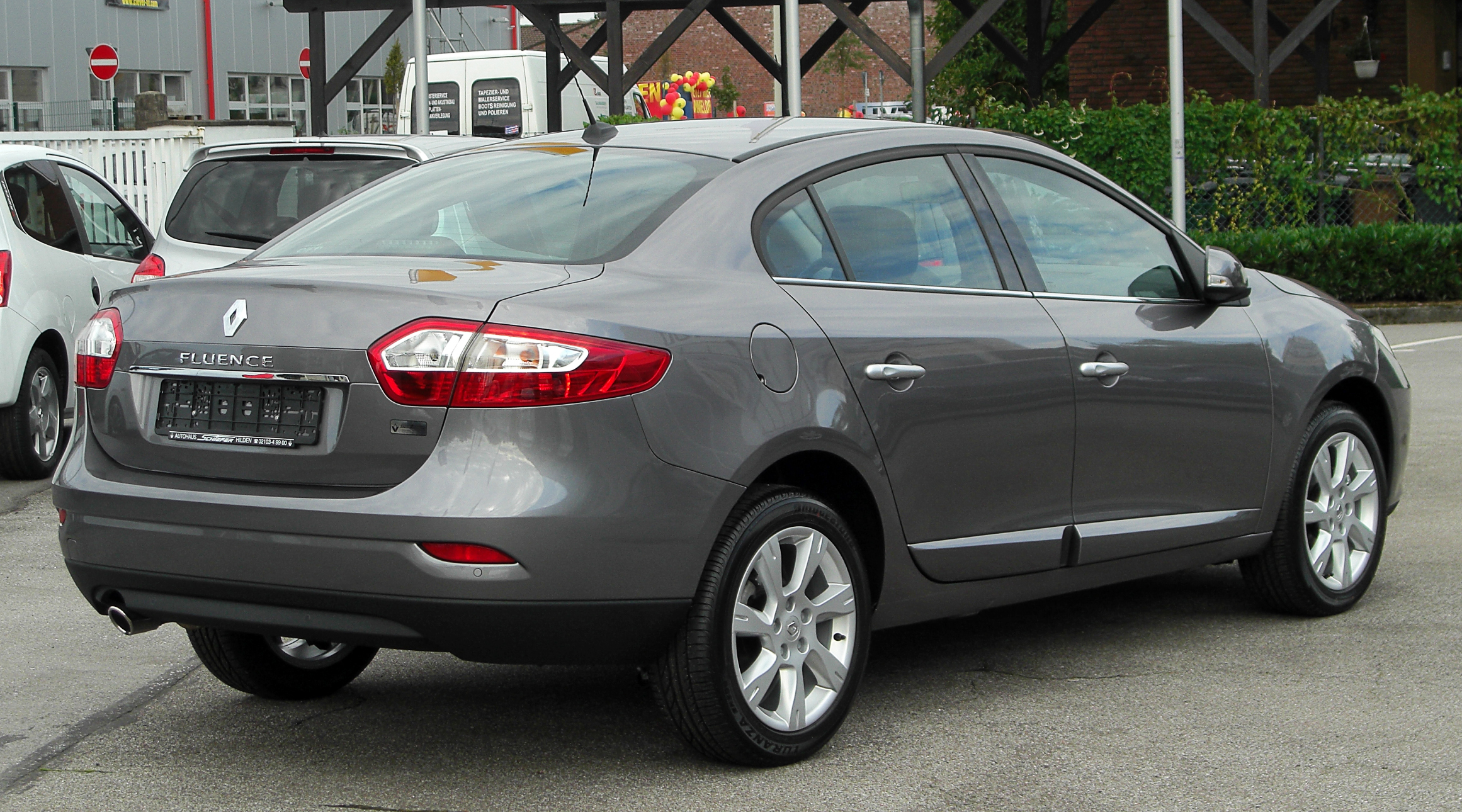
Pre-facelift rear view (European model)

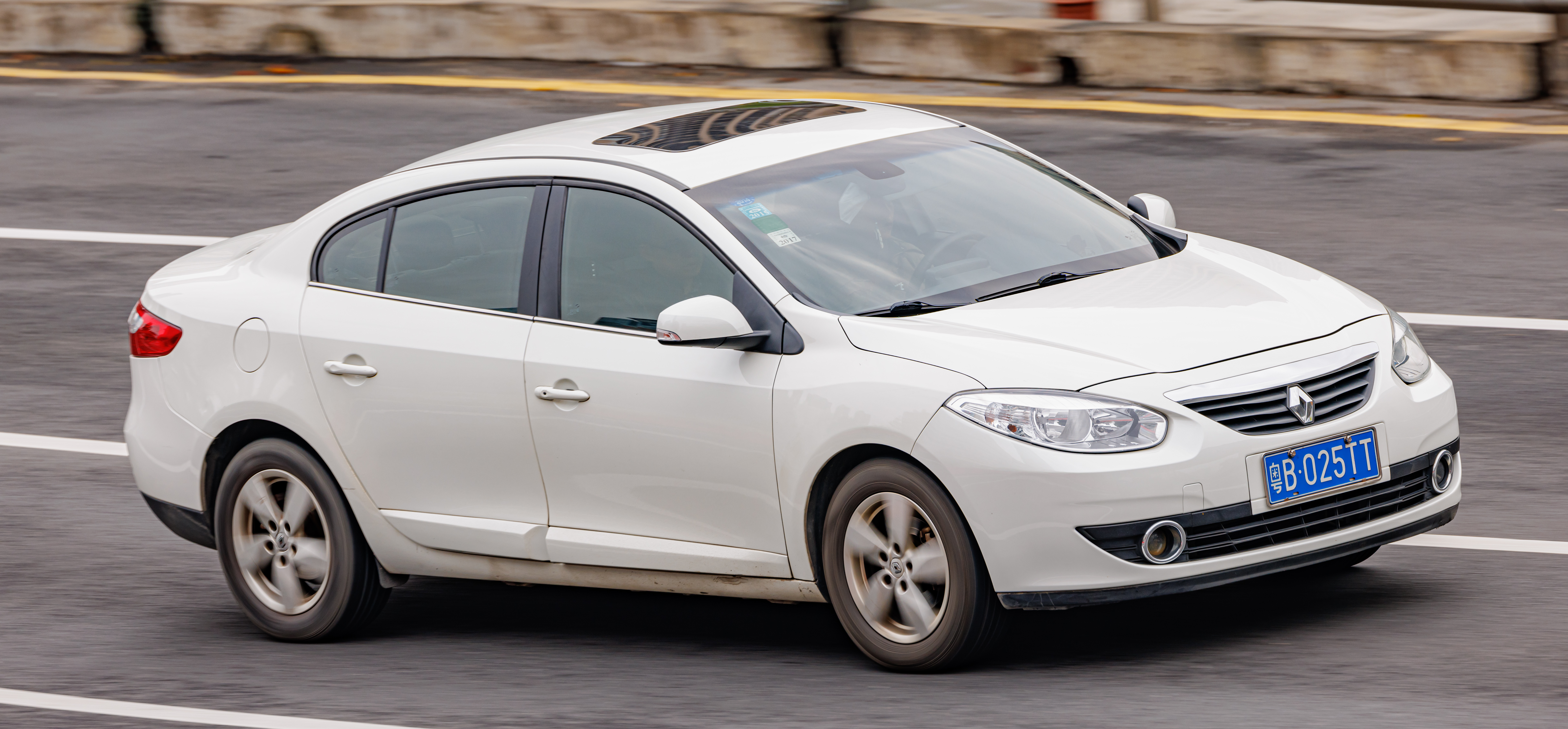
Pre-facelift front view (South Korea built model)

Revealed in August 2009, the Fluence is based on the Renault/Nissan C platform, but it is sized between the compact family saloon C segment, and the upper medium segment.

The Mégane range featured a "three box" notchback sedan variant until the end of 2008, but this was never a big seller and when, at the end of that year, the Mégane III was introduced, there was no notchback version available.

The gap in the range left by the removal of the saloon model from the Franco-Spanish assembled Mégane range was filled by the Fluence in markets such as France, Italy, Belgium, Ireland and - from August 2010, Germany.

The Renault Fluence is also badged as Renault Samsung SM3. The Renault Samsung car was first presented at the Seoul Motor Show in April 2009, and the rebadged Renault Fluence went on sale in November 2009. The model has first been offered with two petrol engines: a 1.6 litre 110 hp (82 kW) and a two-litre 140 hp (104 kW) that can get an optional CVT.

The diesel variant is equipped with a 1.5 litre dCi engine, offered in 85 hp (63 kW), 90 hp (67 kW), 105 hp (78 kW) and 110 hp (82 kW) versions, fitted with Diesel particulate filter, and the 110 hp (82 kW) version can be fitted with Renault's new dual clutch transmission, called EDC (Efficient Dual Clutch).

A Renault Sport version has been offered in Argentina and Brazil, named Fluence GT, using a 2.0 litre 180 hp (134 kW) engine named Renault TCe 180 mated to a 6-speed manual gearbox. The Curb weight for the 1.5 litre dCi starts from 1,145 kg (2,524 lb) & gasoline engines 1.6 litre, 2 litre starts from 1,056 and 1,080 kg (2,328 and 2,381 lb).

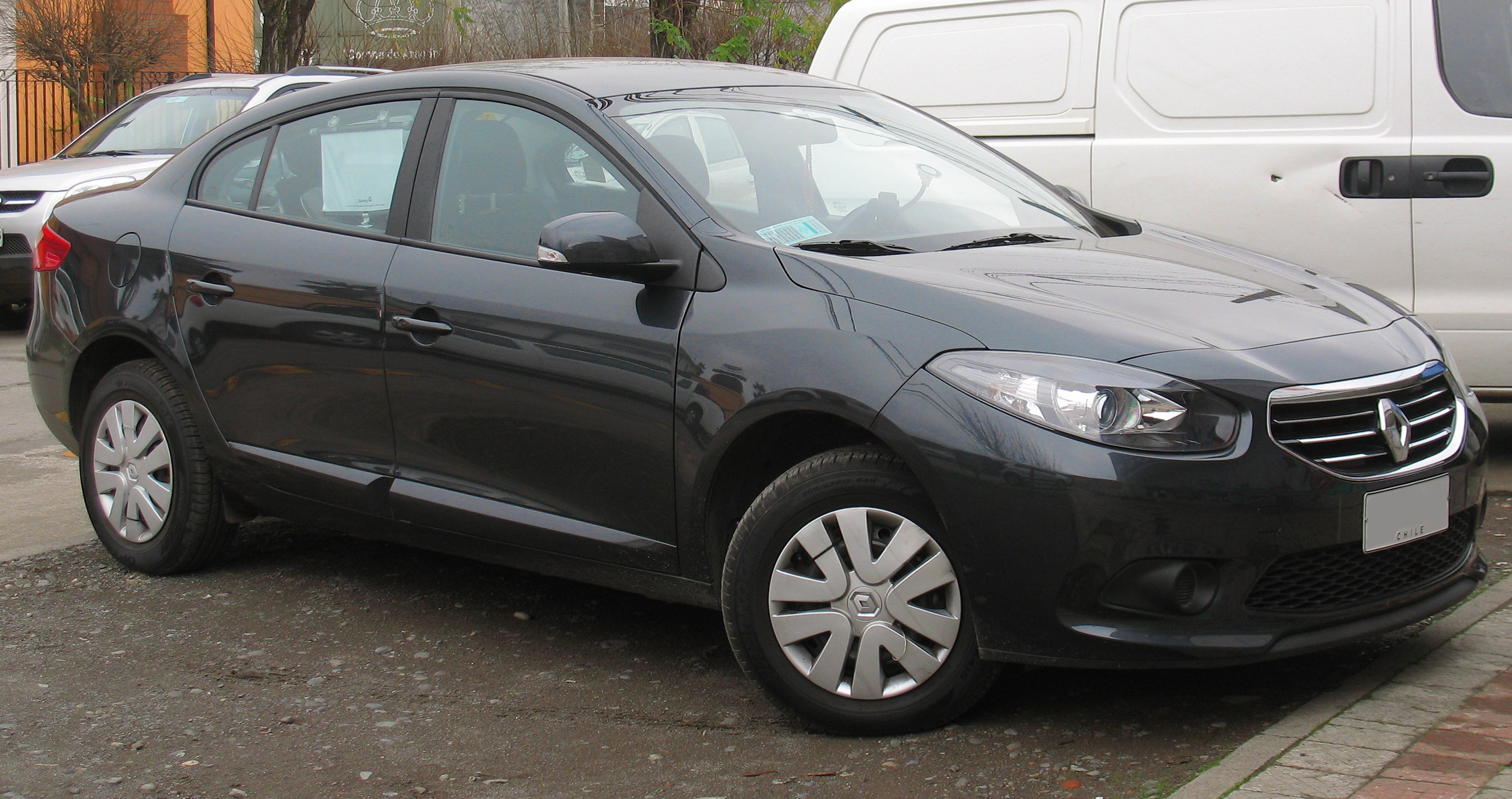
First facelift (South Korea built model)

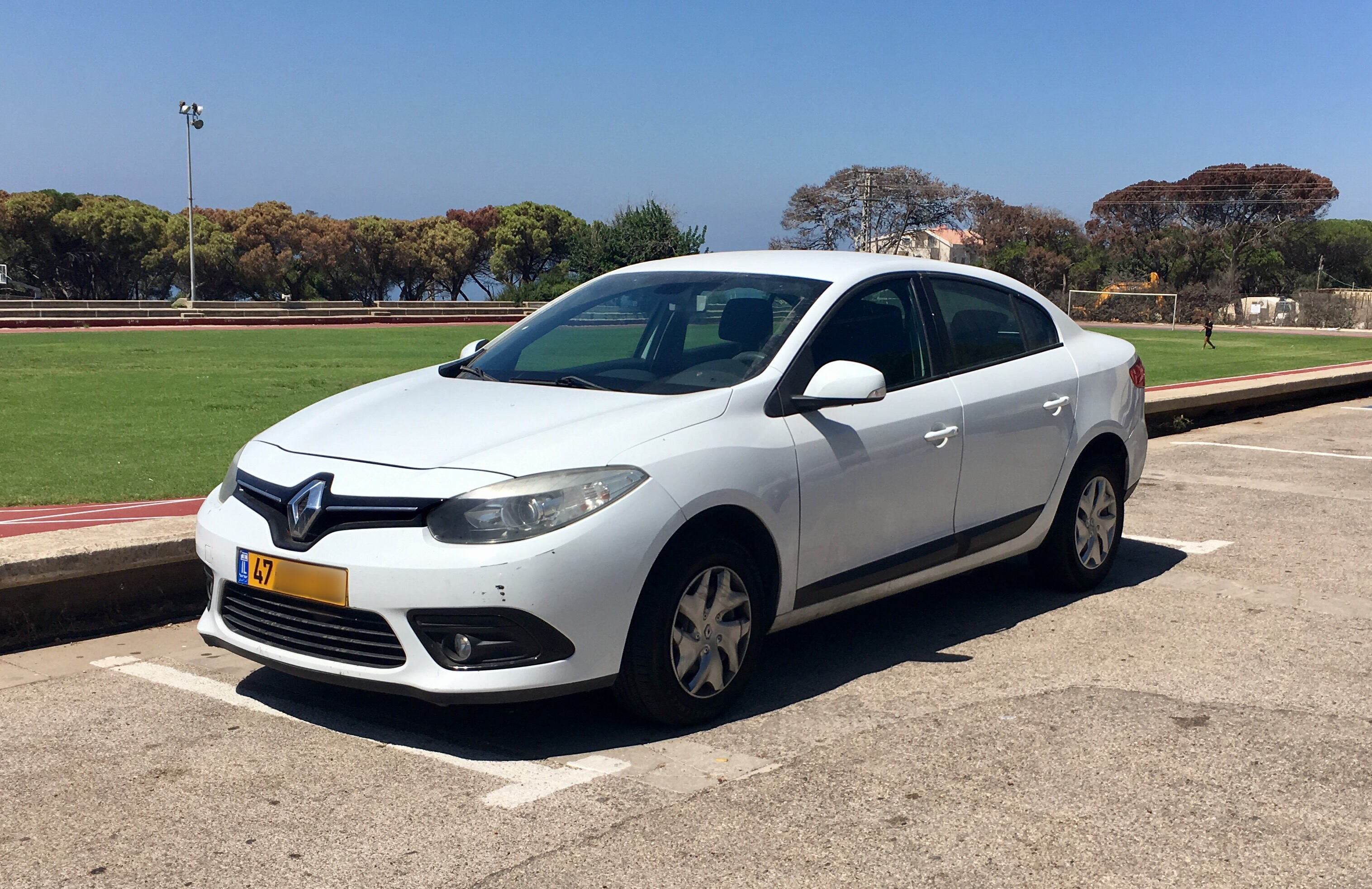
First facelift (European model)

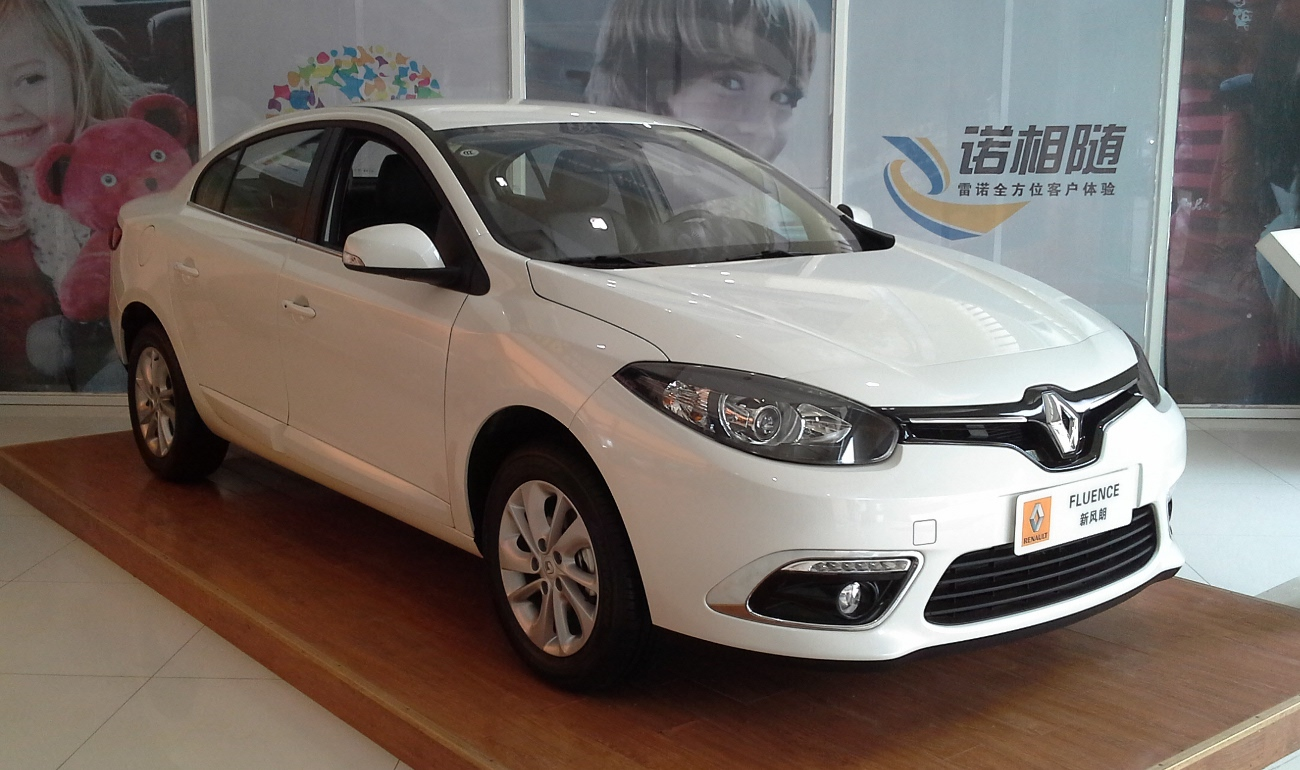
Second facelift (South Korea built model)

=== Facelift ===
As of 2012, the Renault Fluence was facelifted, unveiled during the Istanbul Motor Show; with the new Renault corporate grille, standard projector style headlights and a few minor changes. In 2015, the facelifted model was advertised with a new light cluster at the rear, including LED brake lights.

== Worldwide release ==
=== Middle East & North Africa ===
The Renault Fluence went on sale in the GCC countries such as the United Arab Emirates as a 2011 model. Imported from Korea, there are two engines available, the 1.6 litre with a manual or CVT, and a 2.0 litre with a CVT. Some countries of the region such as Algeria and Israel are importing the model from Turkey.

==== Egypt ====
Renault–Nissan group put the HR16DE engine in the Fluence imported to Egypt with the facelift starting from the 2nd half of 2013 till the final production year 2017, which produces 114 PS (112 hp; 84 kW) connected to a CVT gearbox, the same drive train in Nissan Sentra for the same period.

=== China ===
From 2009, Renault offers a Korea-sourced Fluence in China.

=== Latin America ===
In Mexico and Chile, Renault sells the Korea-sourced Fluence. Its three trim levels use a 2.0 L engine with an option of a manual six speed gearbox or automatic CVT transmission.
In Argentina and Brazil, Renault is selling a locally produced model. Manufactured in Santa Isabel (Argentina), its design is close to the European Fluence.

==== Safety ====
The Fluence in its most basic Latin American market configuration received 4 stars for adult occupants and 2 stars for infants from Latin NCAP 1.0 in 2012.

Latin NCAP 1.0 test results Renault Fluence + 2 Airbags (2012, based on Euro NCAP 1997)
Test	Points	Stars
Adult occupant:	11.97/17.0	4 /5 stars
Child occupant:	20.92/49.00	2 /5 stars

=== Malaysia ===
The Fluence is assembled in Malaysia by TC Euro Car. It is equipped with a 2.0-litre engine and the automatic CVT transmission.

== Fluence Z.E. ==
Renault Fluence Z.E.
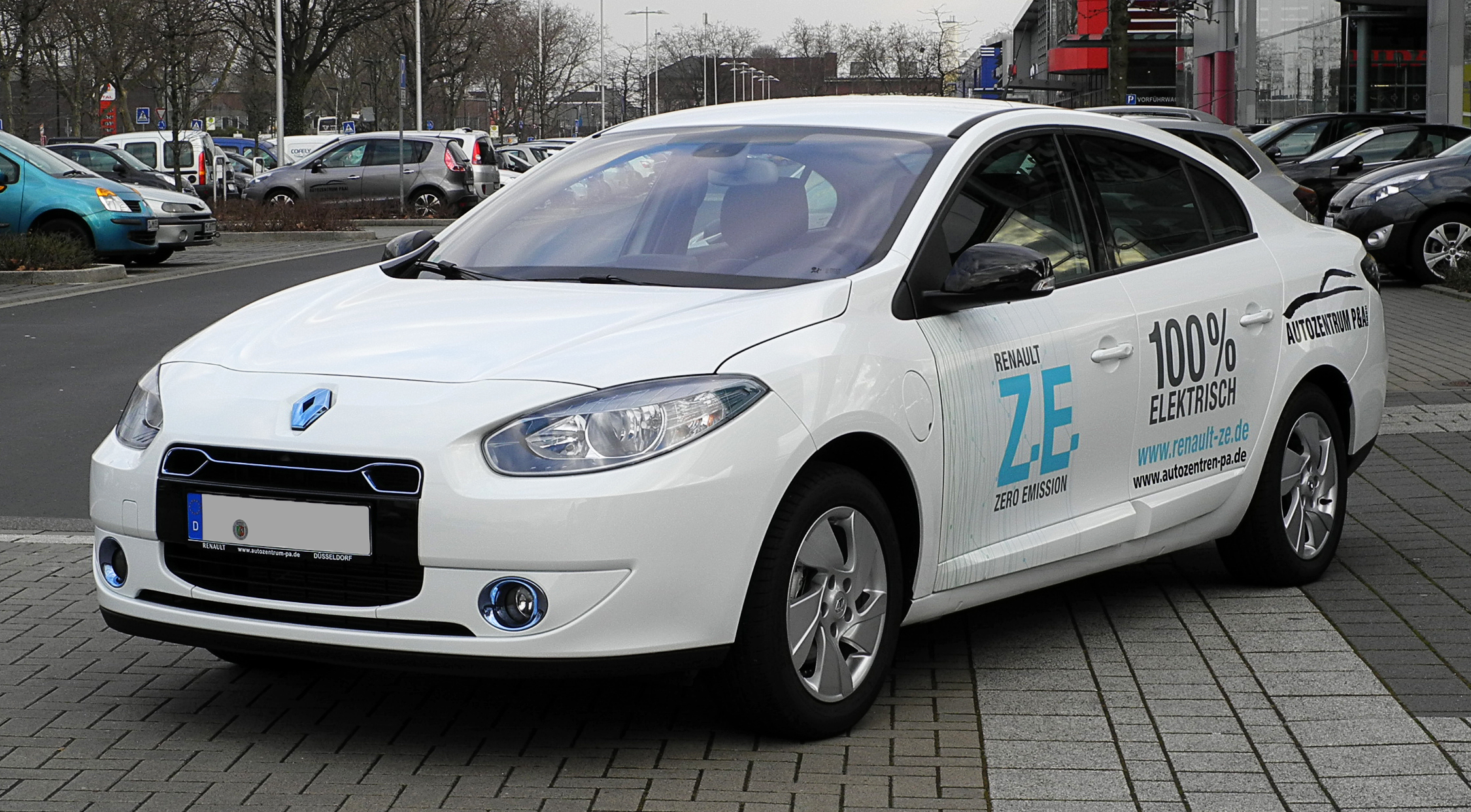

Overview
- Also called: Renault Samsung SM3 Z.E.
- Production: 2011–2013 (Turkey); 2013–2020 (South Korea)

Body and chassis
- Body style: 4-door saloon

Powertrain
- Electric motor: Synchronous motor 226 N·m (167 lb·ft)
- Battery: 22 kWh lithium-ion battery

Renault revealed an electric version of the Fluence at the 2009 Frankfurt Motor Show. This is one of the vehicles in the Renault Z.E. program of electric vehicles. At the same show, the Israeli company Better Place announced the Renault Fluence Z.E. would be the first electric car with a switchable battery available on the network of battery swap charging stations that it is developing in Israel.

The Fluence Z.E is outfitted with a 22 kWh lithium-ion battery which allows a total all-electric range of 160 km (99 mi), with speeds up to 135 km/h (84 mph). Sales of the Fluence Z.E. are scheduled for 2011 in Israel, Denmark and the rest of Europe, and for 2012 in the rest of the world such as Asia.

At the end of 2013, Renault announced that the Fluence Z.E. ceased to be manufactured in Turkey. It is produced with the Renault Samsung badge for the Asia and Pacific region only.

== Fluence GT ==
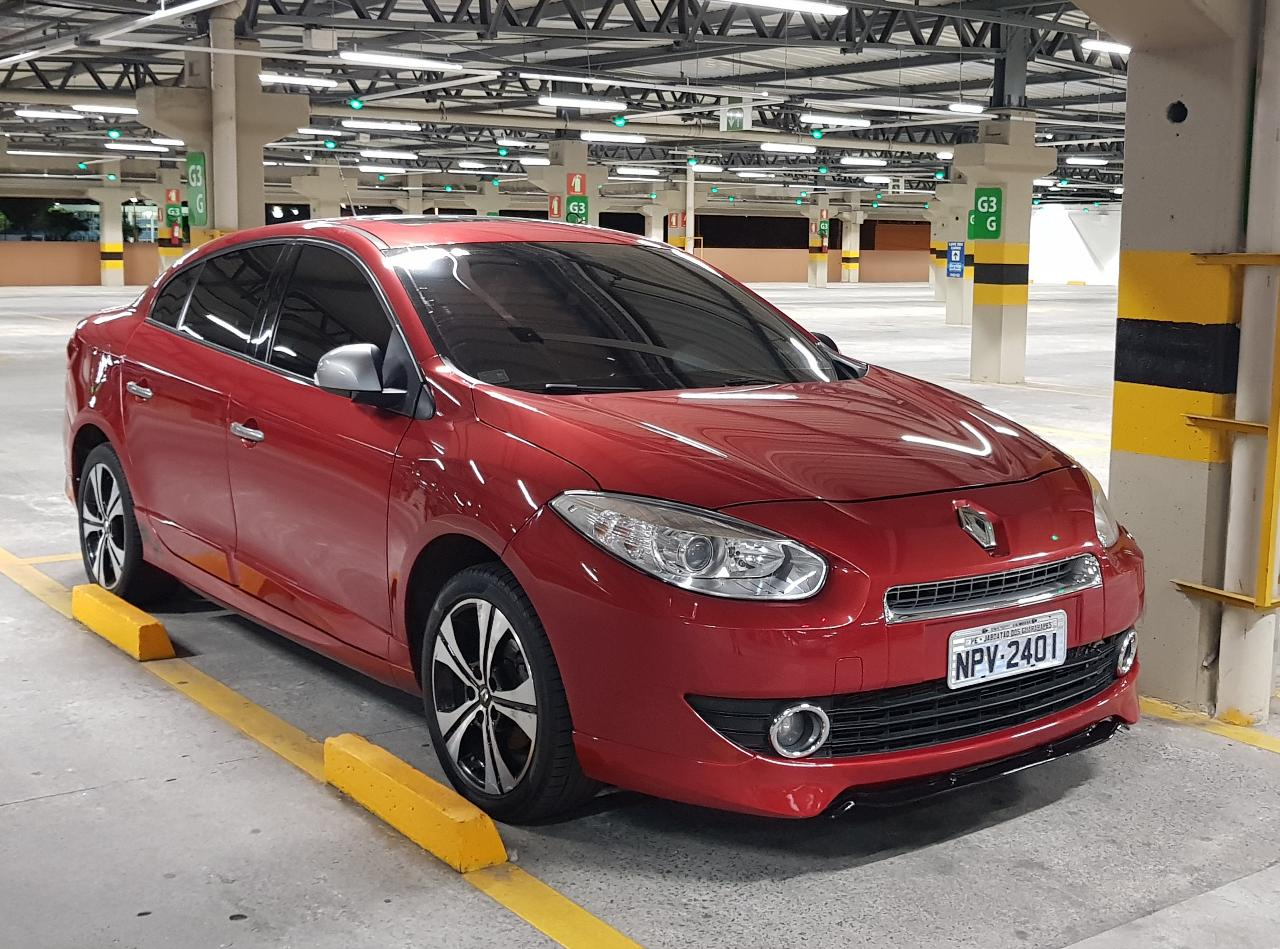
Renault Fluence GT

In November 2012, Renault presented a new version of the Fluence in partnership with engineers from Renault Sport from France, as well as engineers from Brazil and Argentina.

The project focus was to offer the first Renault Sport product developed out of France to enthusiasts and customers who were looking for something more than the available mid-range sedans until that date for Brazil and Argentina markets, notably customers who were willing to have more performance without compromising final price budget.

Based on the Privilège version, with all equipment and options, the GT version received special attention to suspension (springs and dampers) and the same engine and gearbox offered in the Megane GT for Europe. The engine is commercially designated TCe180 (Turbo Control Efficiency), which refers to the 2.0F4Rt engine family tuned with 132 kW (177 hp; 179 PS) at 5500 rpm and 300 N⋅m (221 lb⋅ft) of torque at 2250 rpm.

The engine has a displacement of 1998 cc, with a bore of 82.7 mm and stroke of 93 mm. Compression ratio is 9,5:1. It features sequential multipoint fuel injection. The engine weighs approx. 164 kg (362 lb) and has pistons, linking rods and crankshaft reinforced, nitrile-cooled exhaust valves. The turbo is a Mitsubishi TD04-10T, wastegate twin-scroll unit to reduce lag.

The gearbox is a Pk4 17, six speed manual, three shaft synchronized, hydraulic actuated unit that weighs 54 kg (119 lb). The interior received a digital speedometer, leather sport seats and aluminium pedals.

It was produced from November 2012 until July 2014 in the project of Phase 1. Later, there was a project Phase 2 designated Fluence GT2, but it was only offered in Argentina. There are three external colours available: "Branco Glacier" (solid), "Vermelho Fogo" and "Preto Nacré" (both metallic). It can accelerate from 0 to 100 km/h (62 mph), in eight seconds and top speed is limited to 220 km/h (137 mph).

== Concept ==
Renault Fluence Concept
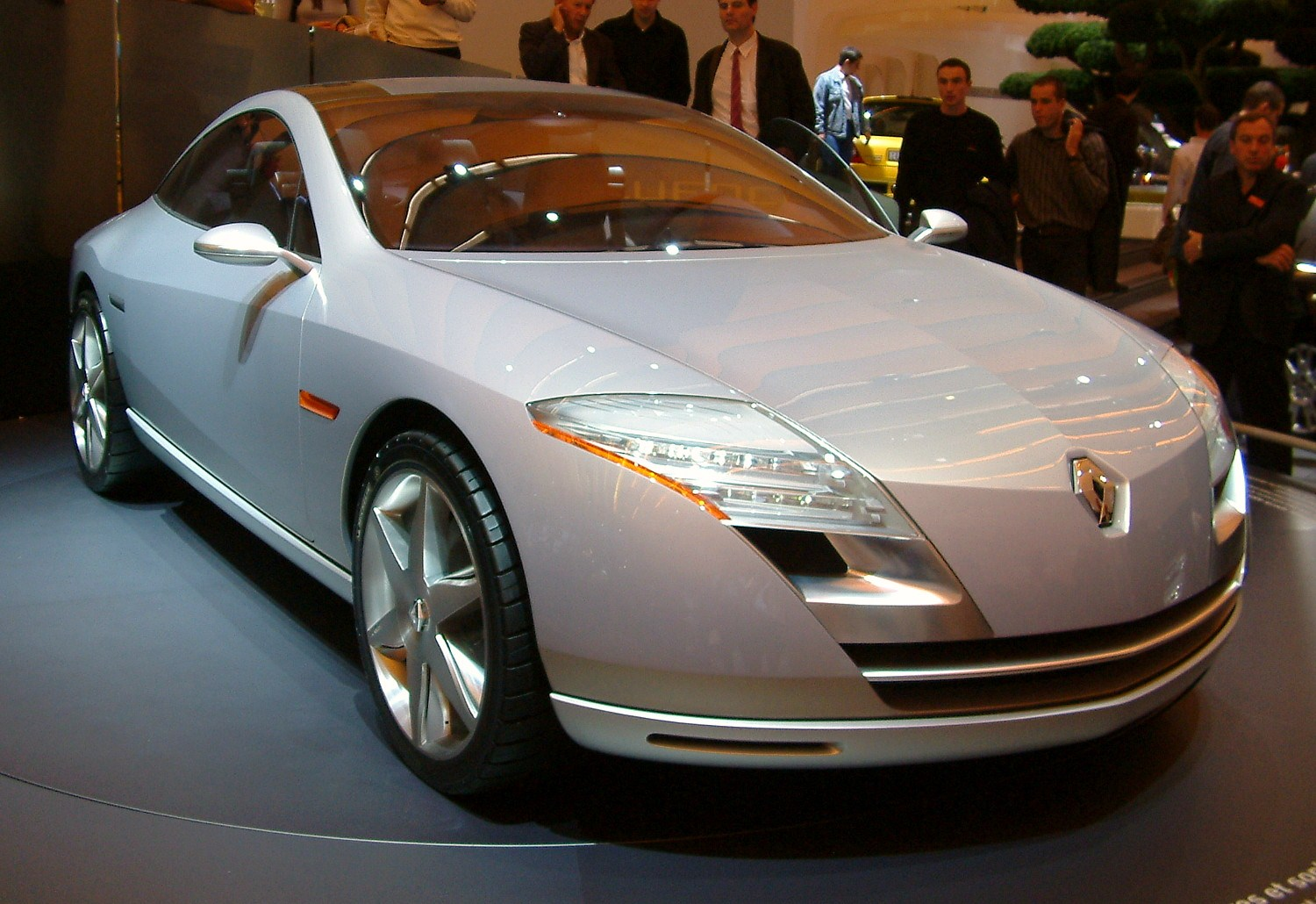

Overview
- Manufacturer: Renault
- Designer: Patrick le Quément

Body and chassis
- Class: Small family car
- Body style: 2-door coupé
- Related: Renault Laguna

Powertrain
- Engine: 3.5 L V6
- Transmission: 6-speed automatic

Dimensions
- Length: 4,600 mm (181.1 in)
- Width: 1,890 mm (74.4 in)
- Height: 1,390 mm (54.7 in)
- Curb weight: 1,500 kg (3,307 lb)

In 2004, Renault presented a 2+2 concept coupé, named Fluence and designed by then Renault chief designer Patrick le Quément, with a length similar to that of the Renault Laguna. It was shown on June 4, 2004, at the Louis Vuitton Car Elegance Classic in England, and at the Mondial de l'Automobile 2004.

The Fluence uses Valeo LED headlights that are angled according to the steering wheel position. An ingenious aspect of the Fluence's exterior design is its V-shaped rear that gives access to the trunk in an unconventional way; an articulated piston mounted in the centre of the trunk lid slides the back up into the roof. The inside of the trunk is upholstered with "Margaux Red" cloth and has a volume of 396 dm³.

In the interior, every seat is fixed to a single rail; the arm rests on the doors are also fixed to a rail, and are enclosed to the adjustment of the seats. The dashboard is similar to that of the Renault Talisman. It has a joystick so the driver can access different functions of the vehicle and view them on a retractable LCD screen.

Several brands, including Michelin and Recaro, were involved with the development of the Fluence. Michelin contributed tires with PAX technology (similar to Runflat), BS tooling manufactured the 22 inch aerodynamic alloy wheels, and Recaro developed the seats.
