= Autodromo di Mores =

Motorsport circuit on Sardinia, Italy

Autodromo Nazionale Franco Di Suni
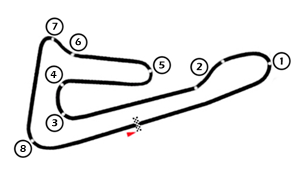
- Location: Mores, Sardinia, Italy
- Coordinates: 40°30′32″N 8°49′57″E
- Capacity: 3,200
- Owner: Promozioni Motoristiche Sardegna S.r.l., Sassari – Sardinia – Italy
- Broke ground: 15 July 2000; 25 years ago
- Opened: 15 March 2003; 22 years ago
- Website: https://www.autodromosardegna.net/
- Surface: Asphalt
- Length: 1.650 km (1.025 mi)
- Turns: 9
- Race lap record: 0:42.81 ( (Brazil) Tuka Rocha, F3000)

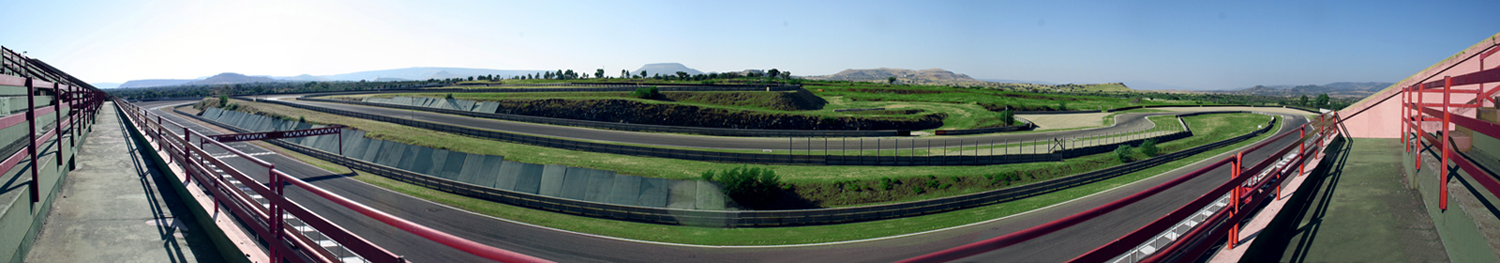

Autodromo di Mores is a permanent motor racing and motorbike race track on the Italian island of Sardinia. Building first started on the circuit on 15 July 2000, and was completed on 15 March 2003. The circuit hosts the Prove Libere Motociclistiche, Sardegna VaCanze, BMW Academy, Gully Racing and Sardegna Motori. The circuit is located mid-way between the two ports and airports in northern Sardinia, Olbia, Porto Torres and Alghero Fertilia.

The Franco di Suni National Raceway, also known as Circuit of Mores or Sardinian Raceway, is the first and only track of its kind on the island. It can accommodate race car and motorcycle events, in accordance with the technical standards and Sports issued federations guarantors of the various disciplines. Namely, the FIA, the CSAI and the IMF.
