= Autódromo La Chutana =

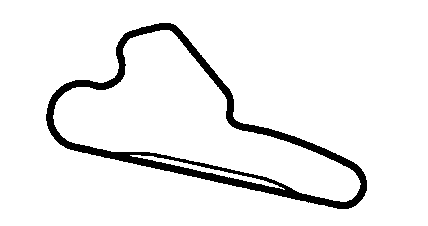
- Location: San Bartolo District, Peru
- Coordinates: 12°23′50.2″S 76°45′8.6″W
- Opened: April 2010
- Length: 2.420 km (1.504 mi)
- Turns: 7

Autódromo La Chutana is a motorsport race track, situated in the San Bartolo District of Lima Province, south of Lima, and is the principal race track in this country. The racetrack was inaugurated in April 2010 and consists of a single track of 2.420 km (1.504 mi), which was originally run only in counterclockwise. Subsequently, with the addition of a chicane on the main straight, the circuit was also used in a clockwise direction.

The layout of the circuit has 7 curves and a straight line of 0.800 km (0.497 mi). Additionally, at the beginning of 2013 a circuit of karts was inaugurated, where they perform competitions and exhibitions to the public.

== Events ==
Since 2010, the 6 Horas Peruanas have been held at the La Chutana, one of the oldest long-term races in South America. In 2012, a new race called Los 200 km de Lima was created. Trackdays and autocross, piques and drifting championships are also held at La Chutana.
