= Autódromo Internacional El Jabalí =

Motor racing circuit in Quezaltepeque, El Salvador

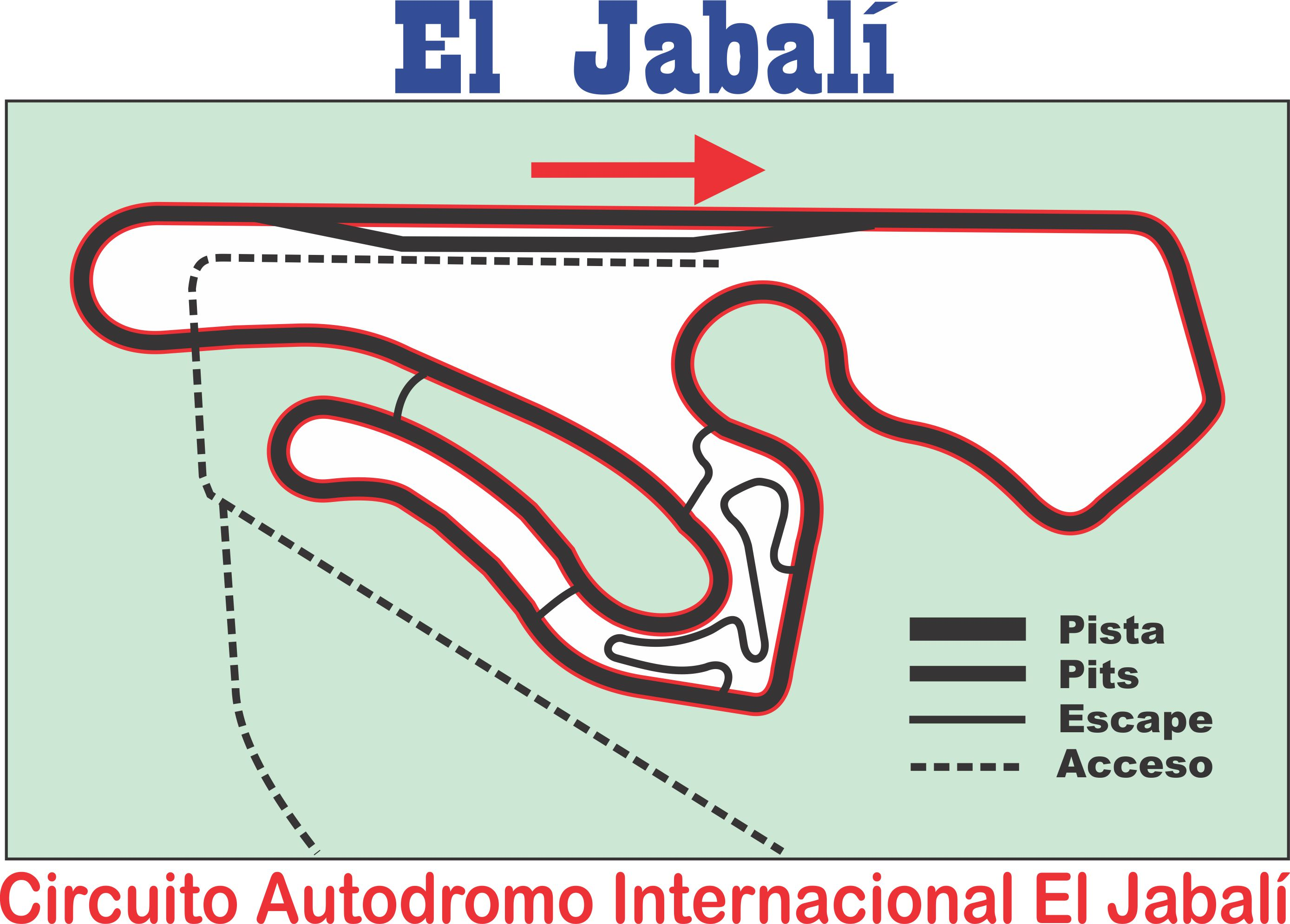
- Location: Quezaltepeque, El Salvador
- Coordinates: 13°48′35″N 89°19′48″W
- Broke ground: March 1978; 47 years ago
- Opened: February 18, 1979; 46 years ago

Full Circuit (1979–present)
- Length: 3.250 km (2.019 mi)
- Turns: 15

Autódromo Internacional El Jabalí is a 3.250 km (2.019 mi) long, permanent motor racing circuit, located 25 kilometers (16 mi) northwest of San Salvador in El Salvador, in the municipality of Quezaltepeque.

== History ==
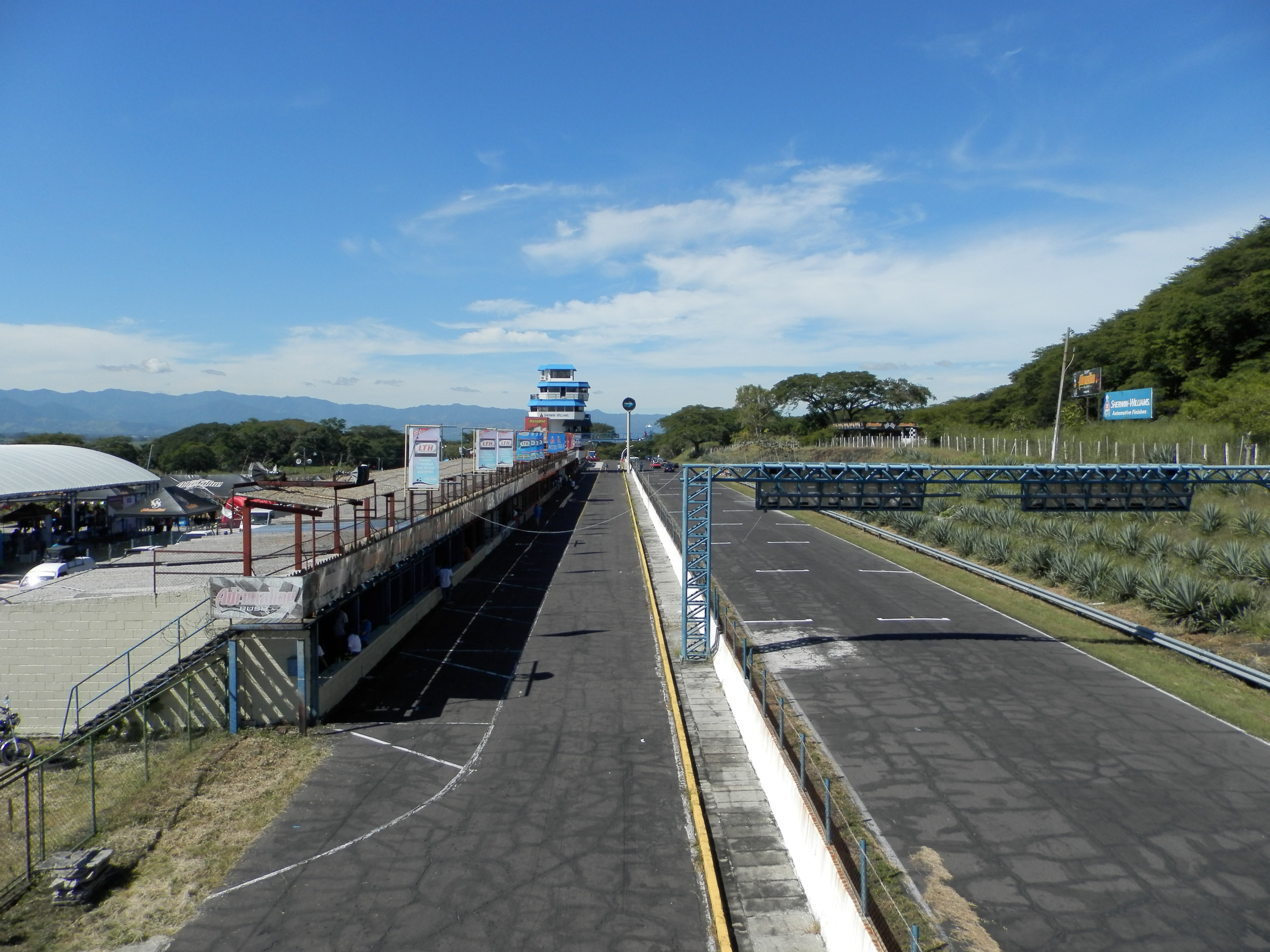
The main straight and pit complex (looking against the direction of traffic), 2016.

The Autodrome was founded in 1974 by the operating company Autodromos de El Salvador S.A. with the representatives of Automóvil Club de El Salvador (ACES) and the then FIA representative Robert Langford in attendance. The property of approximately 100 hectares was acquired on 3 December 1976, and architect Oscar Monedero was entrusted with designing the circuit and project management. Construction began in March 1978, and the circuit was inaugurated in February 1979 through the Gran Premio Delta event. The circuit was named for the "El Jabalí" hill, which sits directly to the north of the circuit.

The circuit currently hosts an annual 200km endurance race, along with regular club racing, drag racing and kart racing. The circuit has previously hosted a regional GT championship, through which the track record was set in 2022 – a 1:24.16 from Guatemalan driver Mauricio Roque in a Porsche 911 GT3 R. The circuit is the longest permanent circuit in Central America at 3.25km, features 4 grandstands with a total capacity of 8'000, and 25 pit garages with capacity for 50 cars – expanded from 10 garages when the circuit was first constructed. The circuit was constructed in an area of exposed volcanic rock with little surrounding vegetation, resulting in higher than average track temperatures.
