= Nueve de Julio Partido =

Nueve de Julio Partido de Nueve de Julio
- Department

- location of 9 de Julio in Buenos Aires Province
- Coordinates: 35°26′38.4″S 60°53′04.5″W
- Country: Argentina
- Established: July 9, 1865
- Founder: Julio de Vedia
- Seat: 9 de Julio

Government
  - Intendant: María José Gentile (Juntos por el Cambio-PRO)

Area
  - Total: 4,230 km^{2} (1,630 sq mi)

Population
  - Total: 45,998
  - Density: 10.9/km^{2} (28.2/sq mi)
- Demonym: nuevejuliense
- Postal Code: B6500
- IFAM: BUE089
- Area Code: 02317
- Patron saint: ?
- Website: 9dejulio.gov.ar

Nueve de Julio Partido (9 of July) is a partido in the central north of Buenos Aires Province in Argentina.

The provincial subdivision has a population of about 46,000 inhabitants in an area of 4,230 km^{2} (1,630 sq mi), and its capital city is 9 de Julio, which is around 262 km (163 mi) from Buenos Aires.

== Name ==
The name 9 de Julio was inspired by July 9, 1816, Argentine Independence Day, the date that Argentina gained its independence from the Spanish Empire.

== Settlements ==
- 9 de Julio
- 12 de Octubre
- Alfredo Demarchi (Estación Facundo Quiroga),
- Carlos María Naón
- Dennehy
- Dudignac
- French, La Niña
- Morea
- Patricios
- Villa Fournier (El Provincial),
