= Autódromo Ciudad de La Rioja =

- Full Circuit (1978–present)
- Location: La Rioja, La Rioja Province, Argentina
- Coordinates: 29°24′19″S 66°52′51″W
- Owner: Auto Club La Rioja
- Opened: 1978
- Major events: Former: TC2000 Championship (1981, 2010, 2023); Top Race V6 (1999, 2009–2011, 2023); Turismo Nacional (1979–1980, 1985, 2009–2012, 2022)

Full Circuit (1978–present)
- Length: 3.266 km (2.029 mi)
- Turns: 15
- Race lap record: 1:14.197 ( (Argentina) Julián Santero, Toyota Corolla E210, 2023, TC2000)

Autódromo Ciudad de La Rioja is a 3.266 km (2.029 mi) circuit located in La Rioja, Argentina. It has hosted national events, such as TC2000 Championship, Top Race V6 and Turismo Nacional.

== Lap records ==
As of July 2023, the fastest official race lap records at the Autódromo Ciudad de La Rioja are listed as:

Category	Time	Driver	Vehicle	Event
Full Circuit (1978–present): 3.266 km (2.029 mi)
TC2000	1:14.197	Julián Santero	Toyota Corolla E210	2023 La Rioja TC2000 round
Formula Renault 2.0	1:14.444	Nicolás Trosset	Tito F4-A	2010 La Rioja Formula Renault Argentina round
Turismo Nacional Clase 2	1:21.372	Alejandro Torrisi	Nissan March	2022 La Rioja Turismo Nacional round
Turismo Nacional Clase 3	1:23.566	Fabián Yannantuoni	Fiat Tipo II	2022 La Rioja Turismo Nacional round
