= Autódromo Parque de la Velocidad de San Jorge =

- Full Circuit (1985–present)
- Location: San Jorge, Santa Fe, Argentina
- Coordinates: 31°54′41.4″S 61°52′0″W
- Opened: 1985
- Major events: Former: Top Race V6 (2002, 2023–2024); TC2000 (1989–1992, 1994, 1999–2001, 2023); TC2000 Series (2013, 2016, 2023); Fórmula Nacional Argentina (2023); Turismo Nacional (1987–1989, 1991–1996, 2001, 2003–2016, 2019); F3 Sudamericana (1987–1988, 1992–1995)

Full Circuit (1985–present)
- Length: 3.120 km (1.939 mi)
- Turns: 9
- Race lap record: 1:11.230 ( (Argentina) Gabriel Furlan, Dallara F390, 1993, F3)

Autódromo Parque de la Velocidad de San Jorge is a 3.120 km (1.939 mi) motorsports circuit located near San Jorge, Argentina. The circuit was developed for national competitions. Around the circuit extends a very natural landscape, composed of important trees that give a beautiful aspect to the path, being considered as one of the best circuits in the country.

== Lap records ==
As of October 2024, the fastest official race lap records at the Autódromo Parque de la Velocidad de San Jorge are listed as:

Category	Time	Driver	Vehicle	Event
Full Circuit (1985–present): 3.120 km (1.939 mi)
Formula Three	1:11.230	Gabriel Furlan	Dallara F390	1993 San Jorge F3 Sudamericana round
TC2000	1:19.754	Marcelo Bugliotti	Honda Civic VI	2000 San Jorge TC2000 round
Formula Renault 2.0	1:22.608	Brian Massa	Tito F4-A	2023 San Jorge Fórmula Nacional Argentina round
Top Race V6	1:25.208	Luis José Di Palma	Fiat Cronos	2024 San Jorge Top Race V6 round
