= Autódromo de Luanda =

Circuit

Autódromo Internacional de Luanda
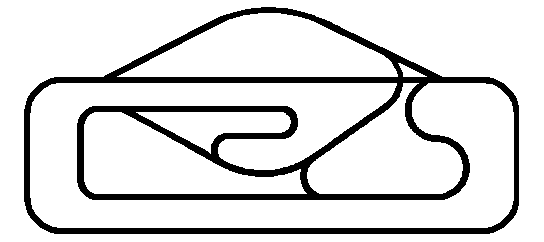
- Location: Luanda, Angola
- Coordinates: 9°0′29.06″S 13°5′55.41″E
- Opened: 28 May 1972; 53 years ago 1972; Re-opened: 2000
- Closed: 1975

Full Circuit (2000–present)
- Length: 4.377 km (2.720 mi)
- Turns: 8

The Autódromo Internacional de Luanda is a race track in Luanda, the capital of Angola. The track is located in the Belas district near Mussulo Bay, about 25 km (16 mi) southwest of the city centre. The track was opened on 28 May 1972. With the outbreak of the Angolan civil war, racing came to a halt for thirty years. Racing events have since been held here again.

== History ==
The initiative to build the racetrack came from the Angolan company Autodel S.A.R.L. and was aimed at developing a course that could be used for many sports from cycling to Formula 1. In parallel, a tourism centre with holiday flats, shopping facilities and a casino was to be built.

The Brazilian architect Ayrton "Lolo" Cornelsen, who at the same time was in charge of the construction of the Circuito do Estoril race track in mainland Portugal, and the engineer Júlio Basso were responsible for the conception of the entire facility. From the beginning, the Luanda circuit was in competition with the Estoril project; both operators competed to see which circuit would be the first to be completed and which would be the first to host a Formula One race. In order to speed up the realisation of the Autódromo de Luanda, Autodel granted the architect Cornelsen a 7 per cent share of all revenues generated by the project.

The Autódromo de Luanda opened on 28 May 1972, three weeks before the Estoril circuit. The first race held at the new circuit on the opening day was a sports car race won by Angolan racing driver Hélder de Sousa in a Ford Capri.

The circuit was only used for two and a half years; primarily sports car races such as the 3 Hours of Luanda were held here. There was no Formula 1 race in Luanda. With Angola's release into independence in 1974 and the Angolan Civil War that began shortly afterwards in 1975, racing at the Autódromo de Luanda initially came to an end. In the following two and a half decades, the track was used as a military and police base. Racing events have been held in Luanda again since around 2000, today mostly organised by the Angolan motorsport federation FADM (Federação Angolana de Desportos Motorizados).

In May 2014, the owner of the Autódromo de Luanda, the entrepreneur and university lecturer Laurinda Hoygaard, announced investments to broaden the offer for visitors. However, she sees the involvement of government agencies as a prerequisite for this.

== Layout ==
The track layout is based on a square oval with an infield section. The Autódrom can be driven in five different layouts with lap lengths ranging from 3.208 to 6.280 km (1.993 to 3.902 mi).
