= Nueve de Julio, Buenos Aires =

9 de Julio Nueve de Julio
- City
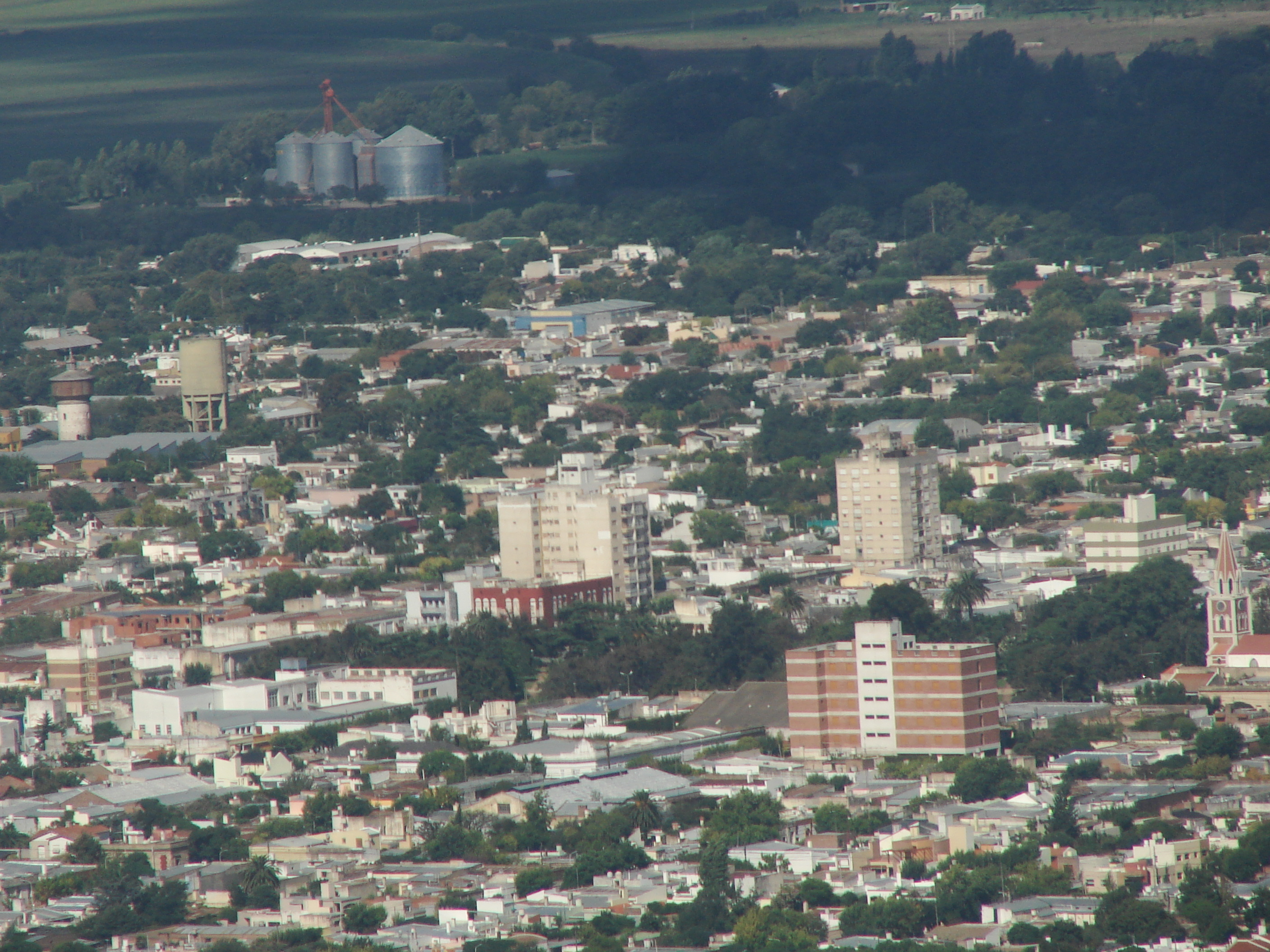
- Aerial view of the city center

- Location in Argentina
- Coordinates: 35°27′S 60°53′W
- Country: Argentina
- Province: Buenos Aires
- Partido: Nueve de Julio

Population (2010 census)
  - Total: 36,494
- CPA Base: B 6500
- Area code: +54 2317

9 de Julio (or Nueve de Julio) is a city in Buenos Aires Province. It is named for the date of Argentina's Independence Day. It also gives its name to the administrative division of Nueve de Julio Partido. Its UN/LOCODE is AREJO.

== Climate ==
Climate data for Nueve de Julio, Buenos Aires (1991–2020 normals, extremes 1961–present)
| Month | Jan | Feb | Mar | Apr | May | Jun | Jul | Aug | Sep | Oct | Nov | Dec | Year |
|---|---|---|---|---|---|---|---|---|---|---|---|---|---|
| Record high °C (°F) | 42.0 (107.6) | 39.4 (102.9) | 40.0 (104.0) | 34.3 (93.7) | 31.5 (88.7) | 26.4 (79.5) | 28.4 (83.1) | 35.3 (95.5) | 32.6 (90.7) | 38.1 (100.6) | 38.4 (101.1) | 42.7 (108.9) | 42.7 (108.9) |
| Mean daily maximum °C (°F) | 30.5 (86.9) | 29.1 (84.4) | 27.0 (80.6) | 22.8 (73.0) | 18.9 (66.0) | 15.4 (59.7) | 14.6 (58.3) | 17.5 (63.5) | 19.7 (67.5) | 22.5 (72.5) | 26.5 (79.7) | 29.5 (85.1) | 22.8 (73.0) |
| Daily mean °C (°F) | 23.3 (73.9) | 22.1 (71.8) | 19.8 (67.6) | 15.9 (60.6) | 12.5 (54.5) | 9.4 (48.9) | 8.5 (47.3) | 10.6 (51.1) | 13.1 (55.6) | 16.2 (61.2) | 19.4 (66.9) | 22.3 (72.1) | 16.1 (61.0) |
| Mean daily minimum °C (°F) | 16.8 (62.2) | 16.1 (61.0) | 14.2 (57.6) | 10.9 (51.6) | 8.0 (46.4) | 5.1 (41.2) | 4.2 (39.6) | 5.5 (41.9) | 7.5 (45.5) | 10.4 (50.7) | 13.1 (55.6) | 15.4 (59.7) | 10.6 (51.1) |
| Record low °C (°F) | 6.5 (43.7) | 4.3 (39.7) | 1.2 (34.2) | −1.2 (29.8) | −4.2 (24.4) | −7.2 (19.0) | −5.8 (21.6) | −6.3 (20.7) | −3.0 (26.6) | −2.6 (27.3) | −0.5 (31.1) | 2.5 (36.5) | −7.2 (19.0) |
| Average precipitation mm (inches) | 121.9 (4.80) | 103.4 (4.07) | 139.4 (5.49) | 118.0 (4.65) | 67.4 (2.65) | 38.5 (1.52) | 37.8 (1.49) | 39.9 (1.57) | 63.7 (2.51) | 114.6 (4.51) | 99.6 (3.92) | 109.2 (4.30) | 1,053.4 (41.47) |
| Average precipitation days (≥ 0.1 mm) | 8.9 | 7.5 | 9.1 | 8.9 | 6.9 | 6.1 | 6.7 | 5.3 | 7.0 | 10.6 | 9.6 | 9.4 | 95.9 |
| Average snowy days | 0.0 | 0.0 | 0.0 | 0.0 | 0.0 | 0.0 | 0.0 | 0.1 | 0.0 | 0.0 | 0.0 | 0.0 | 0.1 |
| Average relative humidity (%) | 65.0 | 69.9 | 72.8 | 75.6 | 78.9 | 78.3 | 76.6 | 71.0 | 67.6 | 69.8 | 64.9 | 62.6 | 71.1 |
Source: Servicio Meteorológico Nacional

== Notable people ==
- Eduardo Francisco Pironio, Catholic cardinal
- Fanne Foxe, exotic dancer involved in a sex scandal with Wilbur Mills
- Mariano Navone, professional tennis player
