= 2026 Fórmula Nacional Argentina =

Motor racing competition in Argentina

The 2026 Fórmula Nacional Argentina is a multi-event Formula Renault 2.0 open-wheel single seater motor racing championship. The championship features a mix of professional and amateur drivers. This championship was held under the Formula Renault Argentina moniker from 1980. This is the fifth season held under the Fórmula Nacional Argentina moniker.

The season started on 15 March, will be held over ten rounds and will finish in December. Giavedoni Motor Sport driver Tomás Campra won the championship after the penultimate qualifying session of the year, with four races to spare.

== Teams and drivers ==
1All teams either run a Tito-built chassis or a Crespi Tulia 25 chassis, both using a 1600cc Renault engine. All teams are Argentine-registered.

| Team | No. | Driver | Rounds |
|---|---|---|---|
| Giavedoni Motor Sport | 2 | (Argentina) Tomás Campra | 1–9 |
| Giavedoni Motor Sport | 26 | (Argentina) Agustín Velázquez | 3, 5 |
| Giavedoni Motor Sport | 33 | (Argentina) Alejandro Guttlein | 1–9 |
| CB Racing | 3 | (Argentina) "Chuck" | TBC |
| JD Sport Team | 5 | (Argentina) Damián Sabbioni | 4, 6 |
| MR Racing | 7 | (Argentina) Benjamín Squaglia | 1, 3–7 |
| MR Racing | 8 | (Argentina) Ciro Di Rosa | 1 |
| MR Racing | 11 | (Argentina) Franco Meschini | 5, 7 |
| MR Racing | 14 | (Argentina) Juan Cruz Farías | 1 |
| MR Racing | 16 | (Argentina) Felipe Saloj | 2 |
| MR Racing | 24 | (Argentina) Santiago Vidoret | 3–4 |
| MR Racing | 28 | (Argentina) Manuel Duarte | 7, 9 |
| MR Racing | 46 | (Argentina) Bautista Faccioli | 2–8 |
| MR Racing | 59 | (Argentina) Tadeo Guttlein | 8–9 |
| MR Racing | 97 | (Argentina) Tomás López | 8 |
| Ferreira Motorsport | 17 | (Peru) Daniella Oré | 2 |
| Ferreira Motorsport | 36 | (Argentina) Renzo Sabatini | 1–9 |
| Ferreira Motorsport | TBA | (Argentina) Pedro Marriezcurrena | TBC |
| Ubaldo Ayala Racing Team | 23 | (Argentina) Federico Díaz Quaglia | TBC |
| Fauro Sport | 23 | (Argentina) Alfonso Grassi | 4–5 |
| Fauro Sport | 73 | (Argentina) Brian Massa | TBC |
| JE Racing | 27 | (Argentina) Agustín Escobar | 8–9 |
| Cudina Competición | 32 | (Argentina) Milton Cudina | 3–9 |
| Della Santina Competición | 37 | (Argentina) Genaro Bevilacqua | 2 |
| Della Santina Competición | 60 | (Argentina) Mauro Guastalla | 7 |
| Della Santina Competición | 111 | (Argentina) Facundo Medina | 9 |
| Della Santina Competición | 114 | (Argentina) José Sánchez | 5 |
| Della Santina Competición | 118 | (Argentina) Bautista Della Santina | 5–7, 9 |
| MG Ramini | 44 | (Argentina) Manuel Costan | 1–8 |
| MG Ramini | 77 | (Argentina) Luciano Vicino | 1, 3–5 |
| Pieraligi Sprint | 49 | (Argentina) Geraldine Ostapovich | 9 |
| Pieraligi Sprint | 50 | (Argentina) Enzo Pieraligi | 9 |
| Pieraligi Sprint | 83 | (Argentina) Fabricio Toselli | 3, 5, 7 |
| Arus Pérez Racing Team | 61 | (Argentina) Ayrton Pérez | 9 |
| Buenos Aires Racing | 95 | (Argentina) Santino Roberi | 1, 3–9 |
| Guevara Competición | 99 | (Argentina) Joaquín Domínguez | 1 |
| Alessandrini Motorsport | 101 | (Argentina) Luciano Sobles | 6 |
| Naza López Competición | 115 | (Argentina) Nazareno López | TBC |

== Race calendar ==
Like in 2025, the championship consisted of ten rounds, with the dates announced at the beginning of the year and the venues announced in the weeks leading up to the events. The Autódromo de Concepción del Uruguay, the Autódromo Oscar y Juan Gálvez and the Autódromo Ciudad de Nueve de Julio all dropped off the calendar and were replaced by rounds at the Autódromo Eduardo Copello, the Autódromo Provincia de La Pampa, the Autódromo Hermanos Emiliozzi and the Autódromo Oscar Cabalén. All rounds except the third round supported the TC2000 Championship.

| Round | | Circuit | Date | Map of circuit locations |
|---|---|---|---|---|
| 1 | | (San Juan Province, Argentina) Autódromo Eduardo Copello, Quebrada de Zonda (Full Circuit) | 12 April | 2026 Fórmula Nacional Argentina is located in Argentina |
| 2 | R1 | (Entre Ríos Province) Autódromo Ciudad de Concordia, Concordia (Full Circuit) | 2 May | 2026 Fórmula Nacional Argentina is located in Argentina |
| 2 | R2 | (Entre Ríos Province) Autódromo Ciudad de Concordia, Concordia (Full Circuit) | 3 May | 2026 Fórmula Nacional Argentina is located in Argentina |
| 3 | R1 | (La Pampa Province) Autódromo Provincia de La Pampa, Toay (Full Circuit) | 6 June | 2026 Fórmula Nacional Argentina is located in Argentina |
| 3 | R2 | (La Pampa Province) Autódromo Provincia de La Pampa, Toay (Full Circuit) | 7 June | 2026 Fórmula Nacional Argentina is located in Argentina |
| 4 | R1 | (Buenos Aires Province) Autódromo San Nicolás, San Nicolás de los Arroyos (Full Circuit) | 27 June | 2026 Fórmula Nacional Argentina is located in Argentina |
| 4 | R2 | (Buenos Aires Province) Autódromo San Nicolás, San Nicolás de los Arroyos (Full Circuit) | 28 June | 2026 Fórmula Nacional Argentina is located in Argentina |
| 5 | R1 | (La Pampa Province) Autódromo Provincia de La Pampa, Toay (Full Circuit) | 8 August | 2026 Fórmula Nacional Argentina is located in Argentina |
| 5 | R2 | (La Pampa Province) Autódromo Provincia de La Pampa, Toay (Full Circuit) | 9 August | 2026 Fórmula Nacional Argentina is located in Argentina |
| 6 | R1 | (Buenos Aires Province) Autódromo Eusebio Marcilla, Junín (Full Circuit) | 5 September | 2026 Fórmula Nacional Argentina is located in Argentina |
| 6 | R2 | (Buenos Aires Province) Autódromo Eusebio Marcilla, Junín (Full Circuit) | 6 September | 2026 Fórmula Nacional Argentina is located in Argentina |
| 7 | R1 | (La Pampa Province) Autódromo Provincia de La Pampa, Toay (Short Circuit) | 10 October | 2026 Fórmula Nacional Argentina is located in Argentina |
| 7 | R2 | (La Pampa Province) Autódromo Provincia de La Pampa, Toay (Short Circuit) | 11 October | 2026 Fórmula Nacional Argentina is located in Argentina |
| 8 | R1 | (Río Negro Province) Autódromo Parque Ciudad de General Roca, General Roca (Circuit No. 3) | 31 October | 2026 Fórmula Nacional Argentina is located in Argentina |
| 8 | R2 | (Río Negro Province) Autódromo Parque Ciudad de General Roca, General Roca (Circuit No. 3) | 1 November | 2026 Fórmula Nacional Argentina is located in Argentina |
| 9 | R1 | (Buenos Aires Province) Autódromo Hermanos Emiliozzi, Olavarría (Circuit No. 5) | 21 November | 2026 Fórmula Nacional Argentina is located in Argentina |
| 9 | R2 | (Buenos Aires Province) Autódromo Hermanos Emiliozzi, Olavarría (Circuit No. 5) | 22 November | 2026 Fórmula Nacional Argentina is located in Argentina |
| 10 | R1 | (Córdoba Province, Argentina) Autódromo Oscar Cabalén, Villa Parque Santa Ana (Circuit No. 3) | 12–13 December | 2026 Fórmula Nacional Argentina is located in Argentina |
| 10 | R2 | (Córdoba Province, Argentina) Autódromo Oscar Cabalén, Villa Parque Santa Ana (Circuit No. 3) | 12–13 December | 2026 Fórmula Nacional Argentina is located in Argentina |

== Race results ==
| Round | | Circuit | Pole position | Fastest lap | Winning driver | Winning team |
|---|---|---|---|---|---|---|
| 1 | | (San Juan Province, Argentina) Autódromo Eduardo Copello | (Argentina) Tomás Campra | (Argentina) Tomás Campra | (Argentina) Tomás Campra | Giavedoni Motor Sport |
| 2 | R1 | (Entre Ríos Province) Autódromo Ciudad de Concordia | (Argentina) Tomás Campra | (Argentina) Renzo Sabatini | (Argentina) Tomás Campra | Giavedoni Motor Sport |
| 2 | R2 | (Entre Ríos Province) Autódromo Ciudad de Concordia | | (Argentina) Tomás Campra | (Argentina) Tomás Campra | Giavedoni Motor Sport |
| 3 | R1 | (La Pampa Province) Autódromo Provincia de La Pampa | (Argentina) Alejandro Guttlein | (Argentina) Renzo Sabatini | (Argentina) Renzo Sabatini | Ferreira Motorsport |
| 3 | R2 | (La Pampa Province) Autódromo Provincia de La Pampa | | race cancelled due to adverse weather conditions | | |
| 4 | R1 | (Buenos Aires Province) Autódromo San Nicolás | (Argentina) Bautista Faccioli | (Argentina) Bautista Faccioli | (Argentina) Bautista Faccioli | MR Racing |
| 4 | R2 | (Buenos Aires Province) Autódromo San Nicolás | | (Argentina) Benjamín Squaglia | (Argentina) Tomás Campra | Giavedoni Motor Sport |
| 5 | R1 | (La Pampa Province) Autódromo Provincia de La Pampa | (Argentina) Bautista Faccioli | (Argentina) Fabricio Toselli | (Argentina) Renzo Sabatini | Ferreira Motorsport |
| 5 | R2 | (La Pampa Province) Autódromo Provincia de La Pampa | | (Argentina) Franco Meschini | (Argentina) Tomás Campra | Giavedoni Motor Sport |
| 6 | R1 | (Buenos Aires Province) Autódromo Eusebio Marcilla | (Argentina) Tomás Campra | (Argentina) Alejandro Guttlein | (Argentina) Tomás Campra | Giavedoni Motor Sport |
| 6 | R2 | (Buenos Aires Province) Autódromo Eusebio Marcilla | | (Argentina) Tomás Campra | (Argentina) Tomás Campra | Giavedoni Motor Sport |
| 7 | R1 | (La Pampa Province) Autódromo Provincia de La Pampa | (Argentina) Fabricio Toselli | (Argentina) Santino Roberi | (Argentina) Fabricio Toselli | Pieraligi Sprint |
| 7 | R2 | (La Pampa Province) Autódromo Provincia de La Pampa | | (Argentina) Alejandro Guttlein | (Argentina) Milton Cudina | Cudina Competición |
| 8 | R1 | (Río Negro Province) Autódromo Parque Ciudad de General Roca | (Argentina) Tomás Campra | (Argentina) Tomás Campra | (Argentina) Milton Cudina | Cudina Competición |
| 8 | R2 | (Río Negro Province) Autódromo Parque Ciudad de General Roca | | (Argentina) Milton Cudina | (Argentina) Milton Cudina | Cudina Competición |
| 9 | R1 | (Buenos Aires Province) Autódromo Hermanos Emiliozzi | (Argentina) Enzo Pieraligi | (Argentina) Enzo Pieraligi | (Argentina) Enzo Pieraligi | Pieraligi Sprint |
| 9 | R2 | (Buenos Aires Province) Autódromo Hermanos Emiliozzi | | (Argentina) Tomás Campra | (Argentina) Alejandro Guttlein | Giavedoni Motor Sport |
| 10 | R1 | (Córdoba Province, Argentina) Autódromo Oscar Cabalén | | | | |
| 10 | R2 | (Córdoba Province, Argentina) Autódromo Oscar Cabalén | | | | |

== Season report ==
=== First half ===
The 2026 season of the Fórmula Nacional Argentina began at the Autódromo Eduardo Copello with Giavedoni Motor Sport driver Tomás Campra taking pole position in qualifying. That meant he actually started the sole race of the weekend in sixth place, but he quickly rose up the order, taking the lead and controlling the race from that point to take victory. Series debutant Renzo Sabatini took second for Ferreira Motorsport, with MG Ramini's Luciano Vicino finishing third to take second in the standings behind Campra.

Two races at the Autódromo Ciudad de Concordia followed, and Campra took pole position once again in qualifying. The first race saw a close battle for victory: Campra eventually came out on top by just 0.2 seconds over Sabatini, with Campra's teammate Alejandro Guttlein completing the podium in third place. The final race saw Campra start from sixth place, but he once again made quick work of his competitors and dominated the race, winning by more than eleven seconds over Ferreira Motorsport's returning driver Daniella Oré. Sabatini kept his podium streak going by finishing third, but now trailed Campra by 37 points after the championship leader continued his run of maximum points.

The third round, held at Autódromo Provincia de La Pampa, was impacted by rain throughout. The track was already wet throughout practice and qualifying as Guttlein took his maiden pole position after Sabatini set the fastest time and was excluded on technical grounds. Sabatini therefore started last, and completed a remarkable feat in the first race as he bested the wet conditions and rose up the order, taking the lead even before the halfway point of the race. He took victory ahead of MR's Bautista Faccioli and poleman Guttlein, shortening Campra's championship lead to 25 points. The second race of the weekend was first put on hold and then later cancelled due to the worsening rain.

The Autódromo San Nicolás hosted round four, where Faccioli took his maiden pole position in qualifying ahead of Sabatini and Campra. Faccioli managed the first race to secure an unchallenged lights-to-flag victory. Sabatini behind him quickly faded from his second place as Campra and Guttlein fought over the runner-up spot, with Campra coming out ahead. Wet weather changed the conditions ahead of the second race, but when it began, Campra made quick work of Faccioli to take the lead. He controlled the race to take victory and increase his championship lead to 47 points. Faccioli eventually retired as MR's Benjamín Squaglia and Cudina's Milton Cudina completed the podium.

Faccioli doubled up in qualifying at the second weekend at La Pampa by claiming another pole position, with Campra second this time. The first race, however, belonged to Sabatini, who started fifth and immediately rose up to contend for the lead. He was able to overtake Faccioli and claim his second victory, while the podium was completed by Pieraligi Sprint's Fabricio Toselli, who rose up twelve spots to third. The second race, disrupted by multiple incidents including a four-car crash in the late stages, was won by Campra, who led debutants José Sánchez and Franco Meschini, before the former was disqualified and Faccioli inherited third. Campra grew his championship lead to 52 points.

=== Second half ===
The second half of the year began at the Autódromo Eusebio Marcilla with Campra leading the field by almost a second in qualifying. He controlled the opening race as Squaglia slotted into second. A fight for third place between Buenos Aires Racing's Santino Roberi and MG Ramini's Manuel Costan then ended in a collision, resulting in a late-race safety car and Della Santina claiming third. Campra followed his race one win with another dominant display in race two as he quickly rose from third on the grid to the lead. He took another victory to extend his championship lead to 80 points. Squaglia took second despite a gearbox issue, while Sabatini completed the podium in third place.

La Pampa held a third race weekend for round seven of the season, and Toselli led Costan in qualifying as he took his maiden pole position. He quickly gapped the field in the opening race as five drivers fought over the remaining podium spots. That fight ended in a three-car collision between Costan, Squaglia and Della Santina, allowing Toselli to take victory ahead of Campra and Roberi. Race two saw a close battle for the win between Campra, Guttlein and Cudina, with the latter waiting until the final lap to make his move for the lead. That saw him claim his maiden victory in his ninth race, while Campra in second further extended his championship lead to 108 points over Sabatini in second.

Round eight was hosted by the Autódromo Parque Ciudad de General Roca. Campra had a one-second buffer on the field again in qualifying, but an engine issue in the first race meant he was forced to retire. With MR Racing's debutant Tomás López also retiring after starting second, Cudina took the lead from third place and converted it into victory ahead of Sabatini and Guttlein. Campra looked set to bounce back from his retirement in race two, but a collision with Guttein dropped him to sixth place. That meant he was unable to seal the championship title, especially with Sabatini taking second place again behind Cudina, to reduce Campra`s standings lead to 94 points with four races to go.

== Championship standings ==
=== Scoring system ===
The weekend format and with it the scoring system was overhauled for the 2026 season. Up to four of the ten scheduled rounds will be designated as special dates, where only one race will be held and entry, qualifying and the race award increased points.

==== Regular dates (two-race weekends) ====
Every driver taking part in qualifying or in one of the races of a regular weekend and setting a time is awarded one point. Points for qualifying and the races are awarded as follows:

| Position | **1st** | **2nd** | **3rd** | **4th** | **5th** | **6th** | **7th** | **8th** | **9th** | **10th** |
| Qualifying points | 10 | 8 | 6 | 4 | 2 | | | | | |
| Race points | 20 | 15 | 12 | 10 | 8 | 6 | 4 | 3 | 2 | 1 |

==== Special dates (one-race weekends) ====
Every driver taking part in qualifying or in the race of a special weekend and setting a time is awarded two points. Points for qualifying and the race are awarded as follows:

| Position | **1st** | **2nd** | **3rd** | **4th** | **5th** | **6th** | **7th** | **8th** | **9th** | **10th** |
| Qualifying points | 15 | 12 | 9 | 6 | 3 | | | | | |
| Race points | 30 | 23 | 18 | 15 | 12 | 9 | 6 | 4 | 2 | 1 |

The worst weekend points-wise of each driver will be dropped. The final round of the season, as well as rounds where a driver was excluded or disqualified from a race will not be allowed to be dropped.

=== Drivers' Championship ===
| Pos | Driver | SJU (San Juan Province, Argentina) | CON (Entre Ríos Province) | | TOA1 (La Pampa Province) | | SNI (Buenos Aires Province) | | TOA2 (La Pampa Province) | | JUN (Buenos Aires Province) | | TOA3 (La Pampa Province) | | GRO (Río Negro Province) | | OLA (Buenos Aires Province) | | COR (Córdoba Province, Argentina) | Pts |
|---|---|---|---|---|---|---|---|---|---|---|---|---|---|---|---|---|---|---|---|---|
| 1 | (Argentina) Tomás Campra | **1**^{1} | **1**^{1} | 1 | 6^{5} | C | 2^{3} | 1 | 8^{2} | 1 | **1**^{1} | 1 | 2^{3} | 2 | **Ret**^{1} | 6 | 2^{3} | 6 | | 314 |
| 2 | (Argentina) Renzo Sabatini | 2 | 2^{2} | 3 | 1 | C | 10^{2} | 4 | 1^{5} | 7 | 4 | 3 | 7 | 7 | 2 | 2 | 6 | 9 | | 201 |
| 3 | (Argentina) Milton Cudina | | | | 4 | C | 5^{5} | 3 | 11 | 9 | 5^{4} | 4 | 4 | 1 | 1^{3} | 1 | DNS^{4} | 4 | | 153 |
| 4 | (Argentina) Bautista Faccioli | | 4^{5} | 5 | 2^{3} | C | **1**^{1} | Ret | **2**^{1} | 3 | 10^{2} | 5 | 5 | Ret | 5^{5} | Ret | | | | 150 |
| 5 | (Argentina) Alejandro Guttlein | DNS | 3^{3} | Ret | **3**^{1} | C | 3^{4} | 8 | 6 | DSQ | 7^{5} | 6 | 6 | 3 | Ret^{4} | 3 | Ret^{2} | 1 | | 147 |
| 6 | (Argentina) Benjamín Squaglia | Ret^{2} | | | 9 | C | 4 | 2 | 4^{3} | 4 | 2^{3} | 2 | DSQ | 10 | | | | | | 109 |
| 7 | (Argentina) Manuel Costan | 4 | 6^{4} | 4 | 11^{5} | C | 7 | 10 | Ret | 11 | DSQ | 8 | 8^{2} | 6 | 7 | 7 | | | | 77 |
| 8 | (Argentina) Santino Roberi | Ret | | | 7 | C | DNS | 5 | 9 | 5 | 9 | 9 | 3^{5} | Ret | 6 | 8 | 4 | 7 | | 72 |
| 9 | (Argentina) Fabricio Toselli | | | | 5^{2} | C | | | 3 | Ret | | | **1**^{1} | 8 | | | | | | 64 |
| 10 | (Argentina) Bautista Della Santina | | | | | | | | 13 | 8 | 3 | 7 | 11 | 4 | | | 3 | 2 | | 60 |
| 11 | (Argentina) Luciano Vicino | 3^{4} | | | 8 | C | DNS | 6 | 12 | Ret | | | | | | | | | | 38 |
| 12 | (Argentina) Agustín Escobar | | | | | | | | | | | | | | 3 | 9 | 5 | 3 | | 36 |
| 13 | (Argentina) Franco Meschini | | | | | | | | 7 | 2 | | | Ret^{4} | 5 | | | | | | 33 |
| 14 | (Argentina) Enzo Pieraligi | | | | | | | | | | | | | | | | **1**^{1} | Ret | | 31 |
| 15 | (Argentina) Joaquín Domínguez | 5^{3} | | | | | | | | | | | | | | | | | | 23 |
| 16 | (Argentina) Tadeo Guttlein | | | | | | | | | | | | | | 4 | 5 | Ret | DNS | | 20 |
| 17 | (Argentina) Agustín Velázquez | | | | Ret^{4} | C | | | 5 | 6 | | | | | | | | | | 20 |
| 18 | (Peru) Daniella Oré | | 8 | 2 | | | | | | | | | | | | | | | | 19 |
| 19 | (Argentina) Tomás López | | | | | | | | | | | | | | Ret^{2} | 4 | | | | 19 |
| 20 | (Argentina) Alfonso Grassi | | | | | | 6 | 7 | 10^{4} | 10 | | | | | | | | | | 18 |
| 21 | (Argentina) Felipe Saloj | | 5 | 6 | | | | | | | | | | | | | | | | 15 |
| 22 | (Argentina) Juan Cruz Farías | 6^{5} | | | | | | | | | | | | | | | | | | 14 |
| 23 | (Argentina) Facundo Medina | | | | | | | | | | | | | | | | 7 | 5 | | 13 |
| 24 | (Argentina) Luciano Sobles | | | | | | | | | | 6 | 10 | | | | | | | | 8 |
| 25 | (Argentina) Damián Sabbioni | | | | | | 8 | DNS | | | 8 | 11 | | | | | | | | 8 |
| 26 | (Argentina) Geraldine Ostapovich | | | | | | | | | | | | | | | | 8 | 8 | | 7 |
| 27 | (Argentina) Santiago Vidoret | | | | 10 | C | 9 | 9 | | | | | | | | | | | | 7 |
| 28 | (Argentina) Manuel Duarte | | | | | | | | | | | | 10 | Ret | | | 9^{5} | Ret | | 7 |
| 29 | (Argentina) Genaro Bevilacqua | | 7 | Ret | | | | | | | | | | | | | | | | 5 |
| 30 | (Argentina) Mauro Guastalla | | | | | | | | | | | | 9 | 9 | | | | | | 5 |
| 31 | (Argentina) José Sánchez | | | | | | | | 14 | DSQ | | | | | | | | | | 1 |
| 32 | (Argentina) Ayrton Pérez | | | | | | | | | | | | | | | | Ret | DNS | | 1 |
| — | (Argentina) Ciro Di Rosa | WD | | | | | | | | | | | | | | | | | | 0 |
| Pos | Driver | SJU (San Juan Province, Argentina) | CON (Entre Ríos Province) | | TOA1 (La Pampa Province) | | SNI (Buenos Aires Province) | | TOA2 (La Pampa Province) | | JUN (Buenos Aires Province) | | TOA3 (La Pampa Province) | | GRO (Río Negro Province) | | OLA (Buenos Aires Province) | | COR (Córdoba Province, Argentina) | Pts |

| Colour | Result |
|---|---|
| Gold | Winner |
| Silver | Second place |
| Bronze | Third place |
| Green | Points classification |
| Blue | Non-points classification |
| Blue | Non-classified finish (NC) |
| Purple | Retired, not classified (Ret) |
| Red | Did not qualify (DNQ) |
| Red | Did not pre-qualify (DNPQ) |
| Black | Disqualified (DSQ) |
| White | Did not start (DNS) |
| White | Withdrew (WD) |
| White | Race cancelled (C) |
| Blank | Did not practice (DNP) |
| Blank | Did not arrive (DNA) |
| Blank | Excluded (EX) |

**Bold** – Pole
Italics – Fastest Lap
^{1 2 3 4 5} – points-scoring qualifying positions

=== Teams' Championship ===
| Pos | Team | Pts |
|---|---|---|
| 1 | Giavedoni Motor Sport | 412 |
| 2 | MR Racing | 261 |
| 3 | Ferreira Motorsport | 211 |
| 4 | Cudina Competición | 138 |
| 5 | Fauro Sport | 110 |
| 6 | Pieraligi Sprint | 96 |
| 7 | MG Ramini | 87 |
| 8 | Buenos Aires Racing | 55 |
| 9 | Della Santina Competición | 43 |
| 10 | Guevara Competición | 23 |
| 11 | JE Racing | 15 |
| 12 | Alessandrini Motorsport | 8 |
| 13 | JD Sport Team | 4 |
| | Arus Pérez Racing Team | |
| Pos | Team | Pts |
