= 2024 Fórmula 2 Argentina =

Argentine motorsport season

The 2024 Fórmula 2 Argentina was the first season of Fórmula 2 Argentina. The season began at Autódromo Ciudad de Viedma on 17 March and finished at Autódromo Roberto Mouras on 1 December.

== Calendar ==
Round	Circuit	Date	Supporting	Map of circuit locations
1	(Río Negro Province) Autódromo Ciudad de Viedma, Viedma, Río Negro	17 March	Turismo Carretera; TC Pista	2024 Fórmula 2 Argentina is located in Argentina
2	(Neuquén Province) Autódromo Parque Provincia del Neuquén, Centenario, Neuquén	7 April	Turismo Carretera; TC Pista	2024 Fórmula 2 Argentina is located in Argentina
3	(Entre Ríos Province) Autódromo de Concepción del Uruguay, Concepción del Uruguay, Entre Ríos	26 May	Turismo Carretera; TC Pista	2024 Fórmula 2 Argentina is located in Argentina
4	(Misiones Province) Autódromo Rosamonte, Posadas, Misiones	7 July	Turismo Carretera; TC Pista	2024 Fórmula 2 Argentina is located in Argentina
5	(Buenos Aires Province) Autódromo Roberto Mouras, La Plata, Buenos Aires	21 July	Turismo Carretera; TC Pick Up; TC Pista Pick Up	2024 Fórmula 2 Argentina is located in Argentina
6	Autódromo Oscar y Juan Gálvez, Buenos Aires	18 August	Turismo Carretera; TC Pista	2024 Fórmula 2 Argentina is located in Argentina
7	(San Luis Province) Autódromo Rosendo Hernández, San Luis, San Luis	15 September	Turismo Carretera; TC Pista	2024 Fórmula 2 Argentina is located in Argentina
8	(Entre Ríos Province) Autódromo Ciudad de Paraná, Paraná, Entre Ríos	29 September	Turismo Carretera; TC Pista	2024 Fórmula 2 Argentina is located in Argentina
9	(Buenos Aires Province) Autódromo San Nicolás, San Nicolás de los Arroyos, Buenos Aires	20 October	Turismo Carretera; TC Pista	2024 Fórmula 2 Argentina is located in Argentina
10	(La Pampa Province) Autódromo Provincia de La Pampa, Toay, La Pampa	10 November	Turismo Carretera; TC Pista	2024 Fórmula 2 Argentina is located in Argentina
11	(Buenos Aires Province) Autódromo Roberto Mouras, La Plata, Buenos Aires	1 December	Turismo Carretera; TC Pista	2024 Fórmula 2 Argentina is located in Argentina

== Entry list ==
All teams are Argentine-registered.

Team	No.	Drivers	Rounds
Aimar Motorsport (Note: Some drivers competed under Aimar Motorsport name, while others competed under Aimar Junior.); Aimar Junior	11	(Argentina) Franco Ledesma	All
Aimar Motorsport; Aimar Junior	24	(Argentina) Mairu Herrera	4
Aimar Motorsport; Aimar Junior	68	(Argentina) Ignacio Monti	All
Aimar Motorsport; Aimar Junior	73	(Argentina) Brian Massa	All
Martínez Competición	16	(Argentina) Nicolás Suárez	All
Martínez Competición	23	(Argentina) Mateo Carrera	1
Martínez Competición	30	(Argentina) Salvador Audisio	9–10
Martínez Competición	37	(Argentina) Tomas Valentín Jara	All
Gabriel Werner Competición (Note: Some drivers competed under Gabriel Werner Competición name, while others competed as Werner Junior and Werner Junior "B".); Werner Junior; Werner Junior "B"	17	(Argentina) Federico Piper	10–11
Gabriel Werner Competición; Werner Junior; Werner Junior "B"	33	(Argentina) Sebastián Caram	All
Gabriel Werner Competición; Werner Junior; Werner Junior "B"	39	(Argentina) Ramiro Bustos	3–5
Gabriel Werner Competición; Werner Junior; Werner Junior "B"	43	(Argentina) Teo Schropp	1–3
Gabriel Werner Competición; Werner Junior; Werner Junior "B"	45	(Argentina) Ayrton Chorne	8–9
Gabriel Werner Competición; Werner Junior; Werner Junior "B"	55	(Argentina) Ignacio Balmaceda	7–10
Gabriel Werner Competición; Werner Junior; Werner Junior "B"	72	(Argentina) Ignacio Diaz	1–3
Gabriel Werner Competición; Werner Junior; Werner Junior "B"	75	(Argentina) Valentino Alaux	1–10
LR Team (Note: Some drivers competed under LR Team name, while others competed under LR Team Junior.); LR Team Junior	18	(Argentina) Ramiro Cuenca	9, 11
LR Team; LR Team Junior	43	(Argentina) Teo Schropp	4–8
LR Team; LR Team Junior	72	(Argentina) Ignacio Diaz	4–11
LR Team; LR Team Junior	77	(Argentina) Martín Chialvo	1–10
ESG Fórmula (Note: Some drivers competed under ESG Fórmula name, while others competed under ESG Junior.); ESG Junior	19	(Argentina) Santiago Baztarrica	All
ESG Fórmula; ESG Junior	21	(Argentina) Santino Ortiz	All
ESG Fórmula; ESG Junior	87	(Argentina) Thiago Nahuel Bettino	All
MM Team	23	(Argentina) Mateo Carrera	2–3
XAMMSPEED	32	(Argentina) Gonzalo Fernández	3
Scudería Ramini	70	(Argentina) Francisco Aguer	9

== Results ==
Round		Circuit	Pole position	Fastest lap	Winning driver	Winning team
1	F	(Río Negro Province) Autódromo Ciudad de Viedma	(Argentina) Santiago Baztarrica	(Argentina) Martín Chialvo	(Argentina) Santiago Baztarrica	ESG Fórmula
2	F	(Neuquén Province) Autódromo Parque Provincia del Neuquén	(Argentina) Santiago Baztarrica	(Argentina) Martín Chialvo	(Argentina) Santiago Baztarrica	ESG Fórmula
3	PF	(Entre Ríos Province) Autódromo de Concepción del Uruguay	(Argentina) Santiago Baztarrica	(Argentina) Nicolás Suárez	(Argentina) Brian Massa	Aimar Motorsport
3	F	(Entre Ríos Province) Autódromo de Concepción del Uruguay		(Argentina) Valentino Alaux	(Argentina) Brian Massa	Aimar Motorsport
4	PF	(Misiones Province) Autódromo Rosamonte	(Argentina) Brian Massa	(Argentina) Santiago Baztarrica	(Argentina) Tomas Valentín Jara	Martínez Competición
4	F	(Misiones Province) Autódromo Rosamonte		(Argentina) Nicolás Suárez	(Argentina) Nicolás Suárez	Martínez Competición
5	PF	(Buenos Aires Province) Autódromo Roberto Mouras	(Argentina) Brian Massa	(Argentina) Tomas Valentín Jara	(Argentina) Brian Massa	Aimar Motorsport
5	F	(Buenos Aires Province) Autódromo Roberto Mouras		(Argentina) Martín Chialvo	(Argentina) Brian Massa	Aimar Motorsport
6	PF	(Buenos Aires) Autódromo Oscar y Juan Gálvez	(Argentina) Brian Massa	(Argentina) Ignacio Díaz	(Argentina) Brian Massa	Aimar Motorsport
6	F	(Buenos Aires) Autódromo Oscar y Juan Gálvez		(Argentina) Ignacio Díaz	(Argentina) Brian Massa	Aimar Motorsport
7	PF	(San Luis Province) Autódromo Rosendo Hernández	(Argentina) Santiago Baztarrica	(Argentina) Sebastián Caram	(Argentina) Santiago Baztarrica	ESG Fórmula
7	F	(San Luis Province) Autódromo Rosendo Hernández		(Argentina) Sebastián Caram	(Argentina) Brian Massa	Aimar Motorsport
8	PF	(Entre Ríos Province) Autódromo Ciudad de Paraná	(Argentina) Sebastián Caram	(Argentina) Santiago Baztarrica	(Argentina) Brian Massa	Aimar Motorsport
8	F	(Entre Ríos Province) Autódromo Ciudad de Paraná		(Argentina) Nicolás Suárez	(Argentina) Santiago Baztarrica	ESG Fórmula
9	PF	(Buenos Aires Province) Autódromo San Nicolás	(Argentina) Nicolás Suárez	(Argentina) Santiago Baztarrica	(Argentina) Nicolás Suárez	Martínez Competición
9	F	(Buenos Aires Province) Autódromo San Nicolás		(Argentina) Nicolás Suárez	(Argentina) Nicolás Suárez	Martínez Competición
10	PF	(La Pampa Province) Autódromo Provincia de La Pampa	(Argentina) Sebastián Caram	(Argentina) Tomas Valentín Jara	(Argentina) Sebastián Caram	Gabriel Werner Competición
10	F	(La Pampa Province) Autódromo Provincia de La Pampa		(Argentina) Sebastián Caram	(Argentina) Tomas Valentín Jara	Martínez Competición
11	PF	(Buenos Aires Province) Autódromo Roberto Mouras	(Argentina) Nicolás Suárez	(Argentina) Tomas Valentín Jara	(Argentina) Nicolás Suárez	Martínez Competición
11	F	(Buenos Aires Province) Autódromo Roberto Mouras		(Argentina) Ignacio Díaz	(Argentina) Nicolás Suárez	Martínez Competición

== Championship standings ==
=== Scoring system ===
For rounds consisting of one race points are given to top 15, with 24 points for the winner.

Position	**1st**	**2nd**	**3rd**	**4th**	**5th**	**6th**	**7th**	**8th**	**9th**	**10th**	**11th**	**12th**	**13th**	**14th**	**15th**	**Pole**
Points	24	20	18	16	14	12	10	9	8	7	6	5	4	3	2	3

For rounds consisting of two races points are given to top 10 in the pre-final, and to top 15 in the final.

Pre-final
Position	**1st**	**2nd**	**3rd**	**4th**	**5th**	**6th**	**7th**	**8th**	**9th**	**10th**	**Pole**
Points	15	12	10	8	6	5	4	3	2	1	3

Final
Position	**1st**	**2nd**	**3rd**	**4th**	**5th**	**6th**	**7th**	**8th**	**9th**	**10th**	**11th**	**12th**	**13th**	**14th**	**15th**
Points	25	20	17	15	13	11	9	8	7	6	5	4	3	2	1

In every round, every driver who competed in at least one training session got 5 points.

=== Drivers' championship ===
Pos.	Driver	(Río Negro Province) VIE	(Neuquén Province) NEU	(Entre Ríos Province) CON		(Misiones Province) POS		(Buenos Aires Province) LAP1		(Buenos Aires) BUE		(San Luis Province) SAL		(Entre Ríos Province) PAR		(Buenos Aires Province) SAN		(La Pampa Province) TOA		(Buenos Aires Province) LAP2		Points
Pos.	Driver	F	F	PF	F	PF	F	PF	F	PF	F	PF	F	PF	F	PF	F	PF	F	PF	F	Points
1	(Argentina) Nicolás Suárez	3	2	2	2	2	1	5	2	2	3	7	12†	2	2	**1**	1	2	4	**1**	1	370
2	(Argentina) Brian Massa	8	WD	1	1	**13†**	3	**1**	1	**1**	1	2	1	1	3	3	3	4	2	6	6	345
3	(Argentina) Santiago Baztarrica	**1**	**1**	**3**	3	4	2	6	3	6	4	**1**	3	8	1	2	2	7	5	5	5	340
4	(Argentina) Tomas Valentín Jara	13†	5	5	4	1	8	2	4	EX	5	8	6	12	8	7	4	3	1	2	2	265
5	(Argentina) Sebastián Caram	5	4	12	10	3	10	4	7	3	9	3	2	**7**	9	9	6	**1**	3	3	3	260
6	(Argentina) Martín Chialvo	2	9	13†	5	9	4	13†	6	4	2	5	7	3	7	4	14†	6	10			202
7	(Argentina) Ignacio Diaz	6	12	8	8	7	6	3	9	8	12	12†	5	9	4	10	8	9	7	10	9	180
8	(Argentina) Valentino Alaux	7	10	11	6	12	14†	7	11	12†	7	4	4	4	10	5	5	5	6			171
9	(Argentina) Ignacio Monti	12†	3	14†	11	8	9	10	10	5	11	6	13†	11	12	16	10	10	11	9	8	145
10	(Argentina) Santino Ortiz	4	6	6	15†	15†	7	9	8	7	8					8	WD	8	9	8	11	131
11	(Argentina) Thiago Nahuel Bettino	11	8	4	13†	5	13†	EX		11	13	10	11	10	6	14	15†			4	4	130
12	(Argentina) Franco Ledesma	9	11	7	14†	11	15†	12†	WD	10	10	13†	8	13	13	13	7	13	8	7	7	124
13	(Argentina) Teo Schropp	10	13	15†	12†	6	5	8	5	9	6	9	9	6	11							121
14	(Argentina) Mateo Carrera	14†	7	9	7																	39
15	(Argentina) Ignacio Balmaceda											11	10	14†	14	17	12	14	13			35
16	(Argentina) Ayrton Chorne													5	5	6	WD					34
17	(Argentina) Ramiro Bustos			10	9	14†	11	11	12													32
18	(Argentina) Salvador Audisio															12	11	11	12			19
19	(Argentina) Federico Piper																	12	14†	11	10	18
20	(Argentina) Ramiro Cuenca															15	13			12	12†	17
21	(Argentina) Francisco Aguer															11	9					12
22	(Argentina) Mairu Herrera					10	12															10
–	(Argentina) Gonzalo Fernández			WD	WD																	–

Colour	Result
Gold	Winner
Silver	Second place
Bronze	Third place
Green	Points classification
Blue	Non-points classification
Blue	Non-classified finish (NC)
Purple	Retired, not classified (Ret)
Red	Did not qualify (DNQ)
Red	Did not pre-qualify (DNPQ)
Black	Disqualified (DSQ)
White	Did not start (DNS)
White	Withdrew (WD)
White	Race cancelled (C)
Blank	Did not practice (DNP)
Blank	Did not arrive (DNA)
Blank	Excluded (EX)

**Bold** – Pole

Italics – Fastest Lap

† — Did not finish, but classified

=== Teams' championship ===
Pos.	Team	Points
1	Martínez Competición	635
2	Aimar Motorsport	523
3	ESG Fórmula	511
4	Gabriel Werner Competición	482
5	LR Team	371
6	Werner Junior	174
7	Aimar Junior	104
8	LR Team Junior	72
9	ESG Junior	62
10	MM Team	58
11	Scuderia Ramini	12
12	Werner Junior "B"	9
