= 2026 Fórmula 2 Argentina =

Argentine motorsport season

The 2026 Fórmula 2 Argentina is the third season of Fórmula 2 Argentina, a single-seater championship created following the split of the two major Argentine motorsport governing bodies in Argentina, ACTC and ACA, in 2024. Fórmula 2 Argentina is overseen by the ACTC.

The season is scheduled be held over twelve race weekends. It started in March and will finish in December.

== Teams and drivers ==
All teams and drivers are Argentine-registered.

Team	No.	Drivers	Rounds
Gabriel Werner Competición	6	Franco Ledesma	1–11
Gabriel Werner Competición	8	Federico Piper	1–11
Gabriel Werner Competición	33	Salvador Audisio	1–2
Gabriel Werner Competición	36	Ignacio Sachs	1–11
Gabriel Werner Competición	95	Morena Moix	6–11
Gabriel Werner Competición	99	Juan Pablo Leonardelli	1–11
Gabriel Werner Competición	1	Valentino Alaux	3–5
ESG Fórmula	1	Valentino Alaux	6
ESG Fórmula	5	Ignacio Monti	3–11
ESG Fórmula	51	Thomas Ojeda	1–5, 7, 9–11
ESG Fórmula	88	Delfina Villaberde	9–11
ESG Fórmula	117	Joaquín Pagola	1–5
Aimar Motorsport	1	Valentino Alaux	7–11
Aimar Motorsport	5	Ignacio Monti	1–2
Aimar Motorsport	44	Sebastián Caram	7
Aimar Motorsport	88	Delfina Villaberde	2–6, 8
Martínez Competición	7	Lautaro Videla	1–11
Martínez Competición	33	Salvador Audisio	3–11
LR Team	44	Sebastián Caram	1–3
LR Team	113	Facundo Gutiérrez	9
Cepeda Racing	58	Santino Dore	1–2
Cepeda Racing	111	Tiago Chiriotti	1–2
R.S. Sport	68	Iván Percara	8
R.S. Sport	116	Simon Volpi	11

== Race calendar ==
Series organizers announced the twelve race dates in December 2025. Fórmula 2 Argentina did not return to the Autódromo Provincia de La Pampa and the Autódromo Oscar y Juan Gálvez, instead it debuted at the Autódromo Oscar Cabalén and the Autódromo Municipal Juan Manuel Fangio. All race weekends will support ACTC's Turismo Carretera and TC Pista series.

Round		Circuit	Date	Map of circuit locations
1	PF	(Río Negro Province) Autódromo Ciudad de Viedma, Viedma	7 March	2026 Fórmula 2 Argentina is located in Argentina
1	F	(Río Negro Province) Autódromo Ciudad de Viedma, Viedma	8 March	2026 Fórmula 2 Argentina is located in Argentina
2	PF	(Neuquén Province) Autódromo Parque Provincia del Neuquén, Centenario	28 March	2026 Fórmula 2 Argentina is located in Argentina
2	F	(Neuquén Province) Autódromo Parque Provincia del Neuquén, Centenario	29 March	2026 Fórmula 2 Argentina is located in Argentina
3	PF	(Entre Ríos Province) Autódromo de Concepción del Uruguay, Concepción del Uruguay	18 April	2026 Fórmula 2 Argentina is located in Argentina
3	F	(Entre Ríos Province) Autódromo de Concepción del Uruguay, Concepción del Uruguay	19 April	2026 Fórmula 2 Argentina is located in Argentina
4	PF	(Santiago del Estero Province) Autódromo Termas de Río Hondo, Termas de Río Hondo	9 May	2026 Fórmula 2 Argentina is located in Argentina
4	F	(Santiago del Estero Province) Autódromo Termas de Río Hondo, Termas de Río Hondo	10 May	2026 Fórmula 2 Argentina is located in Argentina
5	PF	(Córdoba Province, Argentina) Autódromo Oscar Cabalén, Villa Parque Santa Ana	30 May	2026 Fórmula 2 Argentina is located in Argentina
5	F	(Córdoba Province, Argentina) Autódromo Oscar Cabalén, Villa Parque Santa Ana	31 May	2026 Fórmula 2 Argentina is located in Argentina
6	PF	(Misiones Province) Autódromo Rosamonte, Posadas	11 July	2026 Fórmula 2 Argentina is located in Argentina
6	F	(Misiones Province) Autódromo Rosamonte, Posadas	12 July	2026 Fórmula 2 Argentina is located in Argentina
7	PF	(San Juan Province, Argentina) Circuito San Juan Villicum, Albardón	1 August	2026 Fórmula 2 Argentina is located in Argentina
7	F	(San Juan Province, Argentina) Circuito San Juan Villicum, Albardón	2 August	2026 Fórmula 2 Argentina is located in Argentina
8	PF	(Entre Ríos Province) Autódromo Ciudad de Paraná, Paraná	22 August	2026 Fórmula 2 Argentina is located in Argentina
8	F	(Entre Ríos Province) Autódromo Ciudad de Paraná, Paraná	23 August	2026 Fórmula 2 Argentina is located in Argentina
9	PF	(San Luis Province) Autódromo Rosendo Hernández, San Luis	12 September	2026 Fórmula 2 Argentina is located in Argentina
9	F	(San Luis Province) Autódromo Rosendo Hernández, San Luis	13 September	2026 Fórmula 2 Argentina is located in Argentina
10	PF	(Buenos Aires Province) Autódromo Juan María Traverso, San Nicolás de los Arroyos	3 October	2026 Fórmula 2 Argentina is located in Argentina
10	F	(Buenos Aires Province) Autódromo Juan María Traverso, San Nicolás de los Arroyos	4 October	2026 Fórmula 2 Argentina is located in Argentina
11	PF	(Santa Fe Province) Autódromo Municipal Juan Manuel Fangio, Rosario	24 October	2026 Fórmula 2 Argentina is located in Argentina
11	F	(Santa Fe Province) Autódromo Municipal Juan Manuel Fangio, Rosario	25 October	2026 Fórmula 2 Argentina is located in Argentina
12	PF	(Buenos Aires Province) Autódromo Roberto Mouras, La Plata	6 December	2026 Fórmula 2 Argentina is located in Argentina
12	F	(Buenos Aires Province) Autódromo Roberto Mouras, La Plata	6 December	2026 Fórmula 2 Argentina is located in Argentina

== Race results ==
Round		Circuit	Pole position	Fastest lap	Winning driver	Winning team
1	PF	(Río Negro Province) Autódromo Ciudad de Viedma	Franco Ledesma	Sebastián Caram	Sebastián Caram	LR Team
1	F	(Río Negro Province) Autódromo Ciudad de Viedma		Sebastián Caram	Lautaro Videla	Martínez Competición
2	PF	(Neuquén Province) Autódromo Parque Provincia del Neuquén	Lautaro Videla	Franco Ledesma	Lautaro Videla	Martínez Competición
2	F	(Neuquén Province) Autódromo Parque Provincia del Neuquén		Lautaro Videla	Lautaro Videla	Martínez Competición
3	PF	(Entre Ríos Province) Autódromo de Concepción del Uruguay	Franco Ledesma	Franco Ledesma	Franco Ledesma	Gabriel Werner Competición
3	F	(Entre Ríos Province) Autódromo de Concepción del Uruguay		Franco Ledesma	Franco Ledesma	Gabriel Werner Competición
4	PF	(Santiago del Estero Province) Autódromo Termas de Río Hondo	Lautaro Videla	Lautaro Videla	Lautaro Videla	Martínez Competición
4	F	(Santiago del Estero Province) Autódromo Termas de Río Hondo		Lautaro Videla	Lautaro Videla	Martínez Competición
5	PF	(Córdoba Province, Argentina) Autódromo Oscar Cabalén	Juan Pablo Leonardelli	Ignacio Monti	Ignacio Monti	ESG Fórmula
5	F	(Córdoba Province, Argentina) Autódromo Oscar Cabalén		Ignacio Monti	Lautaro Videla	Martínez Competición
6	PF	(Misiones Province) Autódromo Rosamonte	Lautaro Videla	Lautaro Videla	Lautaro Videla	Martínez Competición
6	F	(Misiones Province) Autódromo Rosamonte		Franco Ledesma	Franco Ledesma	Gabriel Werner Competición
7	PF	(San Juan Province, Argentina) Circuito San Juan Villicum	Franco Ledesma	Lautaro Videla	Lautaro Videla	Martínez Competición
7	F	(San Juan Province, Argentina) Circuito San Juan Villicum		Franco Ledesma	Franco Ledesma	Gabriel Werner Competición
8	PF	(Entre Ríos Province) Autódromo Ciudad de Paraná	Juan Pablo Leonardelli	Ignacio Monti	Juan Pablo Leonardelli	Gabriel Werner Competición
8	F	(Entre Ríos Province) Autódromo Ciudad de Paraná		Juan Pablo Leonardelli	Juan Pablo Leonardelli	Gabriel Werner Competición
9	PF	(San Luis Province) Autódromo Rosendo Hernández	Lautaro Videla (Note: Qualifying was cancelled due to adverse weather conditions. The grid was formed based on championship standings, and no point was awarded for pole position.)	Valentino Alaux	Valentino Alaux	Aimar Motorsport
9	F	(San Luis Province) Autódromo Rosendo Hernández		Federico Piper	Federico Piper	Gabriel Werner Competición
10	PF	(Buenos Aires Province) Autódromo Juan María Traverso	Lautaro Videla	Lautaro Videla	Lautaro Videla	Martínez Competición
10	F	(Buenos Aires Province) Autódromo Juan María Traverso		Franco Ledesma	Franco Ledesma	Gabriel Werner Competición
11	PF	(Santa Fe Province) Autódromo Municipal Juan Manuel Fangio	Franco Ledesma	Franco Ledesma	Franco Ledesma	Gabriel Werner Competición
11	F	(Santa Fe Province) Autódromo Municipal Juan Manuel Fangio		Franco Ledesma	Franco Ledesma	Gabriel Werner Competición
12	PF	(Buenos Aires Province) Autódromo Roberto Mouras				
12	F	(Buenos Aires Province) Autódromo Roberto Mouras				

== Season report ==
=== First half ===
The Autódromo Ciudad de Viedma hosted the first round of the 2026 Fórmula 2 Argentina season. Twelve cars entered the opening round, but the fastest man in qualifying was Gabriel Werner Competición's Franco Ledesma. However, he lost the lead of the pre-final shortly after the start, with LR Team's Sebastián Caram taking over at the head of the field. He led Ledesma and Martínez Competición's Lautaro Videla home to win on debut. The final race saw Ledesma beat both his opponents at the head of the field as he claimed victory, with Ledesma leading the standings after taking second again and Caram finishing third, a single point behind Videla in the championship.

The second round was held at the Autódromo Parque Provincia del Neuquén, and Videla beat Ledesma in qualifying to take his maiden pole position. He led the pre-final from lights to flag to secure victory and with it the lead in the championship standings. Ledesma took second place, while Gabriel Werner's Federico Piper overtook Caram to claim third place. The final race brought more of the same as Videla swept the weekend by taking another lights-to-flag victory. Ledesma finished second once again despite having to combat reliability issues. The podium was completed by Gabriel Werner's Juan Pablo Leonardelli after he battled with Piper and the latter was unable to finish the race.

Round three at the Autódromo de Concepción del Uruguay saw Ledesma return to the top spot in qualifying ahead of Leonardelli and Piper. Ledesma kept his advantage in the pre-final as he led lights-to-flag to secure pole position for the final race. Leonardelli was unable to retain his second place as he dropped to fifth, with Piper and ESG Fórmula driver Joaquín Pagola securing the podium spots. Ledesma's pace continued throughout the final race as he held on to first place and secured victory to also claim a 14-point championship lead as pre-event leader Videla finished both races outside the podium places. Piper took second once again as third went to ESG Fórmula driver Ignacio Monti.

The Autódromo Termas de Río Hondo held round four - pole position continued to rotate between Ledesma and Videla, with the latter on top this time. He remained unchallenged in the pre-final and converted his starting position into victory as Monti came second and Gabriel Werner Competición's Salvador Audisio completed the podium in third. The final race saw Videla continue his dominance as he claimed yet another untroubled victory. Monti took second once again, while Ledesma was able to battle past Audisio to claim third and minimize the damage to his championship campaign. Videla and Ledesma ended the weekend equal on points, with Videla ahead on countback.

Leonardelli was the driver to claim pole for round five at the Autódromo Oscar Cabalén, with Monti starting second. He had a poor start to the pre-final, allowing Monti to take the lead right away. Gabriel Werner's reigning champion Valentino Alaux tried battling Videla for second throughout the race, allowing Monti to gap them and secure victory. Videla began the final race by taking the lead from Monti. He fended the polesitter off until Pagola took second on lap six and began pressuring the leader. Videla was able to hold on to the lead to claim his sixth race win of the season, moving 23 points clear of Ledesma, who had a difficult weekend, finishing the final in sixth after retiring in the pre-final.

The first half of the season concluded at the Autódromo Rosamonte with Videla claiming the third pole position of his campaign. He was able to convert that into a lights-to-flag victory in the pre-final, leading Ledesma and Monti to once again grow his championship lead. The final brought a different outcome, however, as Videla lost out to Ledesma and Monti in the opening laps. The latter two spent the race fighting over the lead, with both leading at different stages. That battle culminated in the final corner, where a move for the lead saw Monti run wide, allowing Ledesma to win by 0.029 seconds, with Videla also just 0.054 seconds behind in third. That brought Videla's lead down to 21 points.

=== Second half ===
Ledesma also claimed his third pole position in qualifying for round seven at the Circuito San Juan Villicum. Videla started the pre-final alongside him and was able to claim the lead right at the start of the race. Monti was also able to move past Ledesma mid-race, displacing the poleman to third at the chequered flag. Ledesma bounced back in the final race, where he started first and quickly overtook Monti to move into second. Race leader Videla then suffered technical issues, leading to him dropping to third and allowing Ledesma to take his second final victory in a row. With Videla and Ledesma sharing wins, Ledesma was unable to significantly reduce Videla's points lead in the championship.

Leonardelli claimed his second pole position in qualifying at the Autódromo Ciudad de Paraná, ahead of Monti. He led every lap of the pre-final, while Monti was locked in battle with Videla and Piper over the remaining podium spots. Points leader Videla eventually took second, with Piper claiming third. Leonardelli doubled up in the main race by securing his maiden final victory with another lights-to-flag run. Behind him, Piper was able to better his pre-final performance and take second, while Ledesma completed the podium. Videla faded to fifth after starting second, but an eighth place in the pre-final for Ledesma meant Videla was still able to extend his championship lead to 30 points.

Round nine at the Autódromo Rosendo Hernández was disrupted by sudden snowfall during the event, which prompted organizers to temporarily halt track activity. Qualifying was cancelled, with the grid for the pre-final set by championship standings. When the race got underway, Alaux coped best with the conditions as he rose from seventh on the grid to the lead and took victory. Monti took second as polesitter Videla dropped to third. That trio then collided at the start of the final race, handing the lead to Piper as Alaux dropped to second and Audisio took third. The top ranks remained static afterwards as Piper took his maiden victory. Ledesma retired, so Videla grew his lead to 50 points.

Videla took his fifth pole position of the year in qualifying at the Autódromo Juan María Traverso. Ledesma initially took the lead at the start of the pre-final, but Videla was able to get back past him two laps later. From that point on, he led the field and secured victory as Alaux held off multiple other drivers to secure third place. That placed Videla on pole position for the final race, but once again, Ledesma got the better start. He passed Videla on the opening lap, but this time was able to quickly pull away and secure his fifth victory of the season. Alaux took third once again. Despite Ledesma's win, Videla was able to again slightly extend his lead over the weekend, which now stood at 54 points.

The Autódromo Municipal Juan Manuel Fangio hosted the eleventh round, where Ledesma led Videla by four tenths in qualifying to take pole position. The top two remained static throughout the pre-final as Ledesma took an unchallenged lights-to-flag victory. Alaux initially ran third, before retiring mid-race and handing the final podium place to Audisio. More domination by Ledesma followed in the final race as he claimed another unchallenged victory, becoming the driver with the most wins in championship history in the process. Videla lost positions at the start and fought back to finish fourth behind Leonardelli and Monti, his standings lead reduced to 41 points ahead of the final round.

== Championship standings ==
=== Scoring system ===
Points are given to top 10 in the first race, called the Pre-final, and to the top 15 in the second race, called the Final.

Pre-final
Position	**1st**	**2nd**	**3rd**	**4th**	**5th**	**6th**	**7th**	**8th**	**9th**	**10th**	**Pole**
Points	15	12	10	8	6	5	4	3	2	1	3

Final
Position	**1st**	**2nd**	**3rd**	**4th**	**5th**	**6th**	**7th**	**8th**	**9th**	**10th**	**11th**	**12th**	**13th**	**14th**	**15th**
Points	25	23	21	18	16	14	12	10	8	6	5	4	3	2	1

In every round, every driver who competed in at least one points-scoring session is awarded five points.

The first and the last round of the season award 50% more points for the final race.

=== Drivers' championship ===
Pos.	Driver	(Río Negro Province) VIE		(Neuquén Province) NEU		(Entre Ríos Province) CON		(Santiago del Estero Province) TER		(Córdoba Province, Argentina) COR		(Misiones Province) POS		(San Juan Province, Argentina) VIL		(Entre Ríos Province) PAR		(San Luis Province) SLU		(Buenos Aires Province) SNI		(Santa Fe Province) ROS		(Buenos Aires Province) LAP		Points
Pos.	Driver	PF	F	PF	F	PF	F	PF	F	PF	F	PF	F	PF	F	PF	F	PF	F	PF	F	PF	F	PF	F	Points
1	Lautaro Videla	3	1	**1**	1	6	4	**1**	1	2	1	**1**	3	1	3	2	5	**3**	4	**1**	2	2	4			450.5
2	Franco Ledesma	**2**	2	2	2	**1**	1	4	3	Ret	6	2	1	**3**	1	8	3	4	Ret	2	1	**1**	1			409.5
3	Ignacio Monti	7	11†	Ret	9	4	3	2	2	1	3	3	2	2	2	4	4	2	Ret	Ret	5	Ret	3			317.5
4	Juan Pablo Leonardelli	Ret	8	4	3	5	Ret	8	7	**5**	5	6	Ret	6	4	**1**	1	11	5	5	4	5	2			286
5	Federico Piper	8	4	3	Ret	2	2	5	5	8	8	4	4	7	10†	3	2	5	1	6	7	4	Ret			284
6	Valentino Alaux					Ret	7	7	6	3	4	Ret	5	4	5	5	Ret	1	2	3	3	Ret	9			226
7	Salvador Audisio	EX	7	9	7	9	Ret	3	4	9	7	5	Ret	5	8	7	6	7	3	Ret	6	3	Ret			219
8	Ignacio Sachs	Ret	9	10	10	Ret	6	Ret	9	6	9	7	6	8	6	9	Ret	10	6	7	9	6	5			192
9	Thomas Ojeda	9	Ret	8	11	7	9	9	8	7	10			9	7			8	9	4	8	8	6			149
10	Joaquín Pagola	6	10	7	5	3	5	6	Ret	4	2															121
11	Delfina Villaberde			12†	12	8	8	10	10	10	Ret	8	8			Ret	8	12	10	9	11	Ret	10			109
12	Morena Moix											Ret	7	10	9	Ret	7	9	8	8	10	9	7			98
13	Sebastián Caram	1	3	6	4	EX	Ret							11	Ret											89.5
14	Tiago Chiriotti	5	5	5	8																					56
15	Santino Dore	4	6	11	6																					53
16	Facundo Gutiérrez																	6	7							22
17	Simon Volpi																					7	8			19
18	Iván Percara															6	Ret									10
Pos.	Driver	PF	F	PF	F	PF	F	PF	F	PF	F	PF	F	PF	F	PF	F	PF	F	PF	F	PF	F	PF	F	Points
Pos.	Driver	(Río Negro Province) VIE		(Neuquén Province) NEU		(Entre Ríos Province) CON		(Santiago del Estero Province) TER		(Córdoba Province, Argentina) COR		(Misiones Province) POS		(San Juan Province, Argentina) VIL		(Entre Ríos Province) PAR		(San Luis Province) SLU		(Buenos Aires Province) SNI		(Santa Fe Province) ROS		(Buenos Aires Province) LAP		Points

Colour	Result
Gold	Winner
Silver	Second place
Bronze	Third place
Green	Points classification
Blue	Non-points classification
Blue	Non-classified finish (NC)
Purple	Retired, not classified (Ret)
Red	Did not qualify (DNQ)
Red	Did not pre-qualify (DNPQ)
Black	Disqualified (DSQ)
White	Did not start (DNS)
White	Withdrew (WD)
White	Race cancelled (C)
Blank	Did not practice (DNP)
Blank	Did not arrive (DNA)
Blank	Excluded (EX)

**Bold** – Pole

Italics – Fastest Lap

† – Did not finish, but classified
