= Toay Department =

Coordinates: 36.6736°S 64.3797°W

- Department
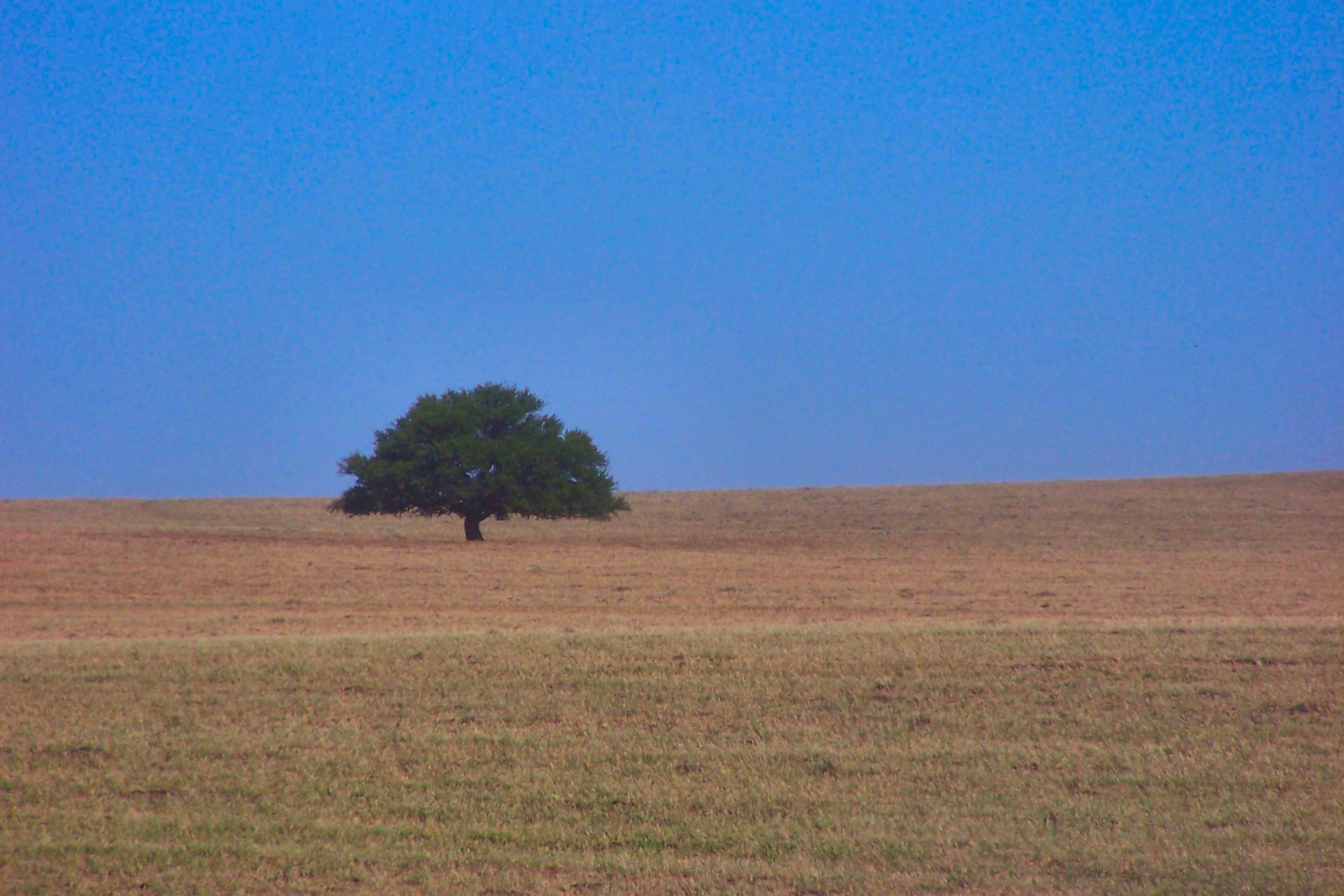
- Rural area near Toay town

- Location of Toay Department within La Pampa Province
- Country: Argentina
- Province: La Pampa
- Capital: Toay

Area
  - Total: 5,092 km^{2} (1,966 sq mi)

Population (2022)
  - Total: 18,029
  - Density: 3.541/km^{2} (9.170/sq mi)
- Time zone: ART

Toay Department is a department of Argentina in La Pampa Province. The capital city of the department is Toay.

The department covers a total area of 5,092 km² (1,966 sq mi) and, as of the 2022 census, has a population of 18,029 inhabitants.

== Etymology ==
The name comes from a Mapuche expression that means "turn," "roundabout," "opening," or "clearing in the forest."

== Geography ==
The department is composed of the following subdivisions: the Toay municipality; the Winifreda municipality, with part of its rural area in the Conhelo and Capital departments; Naicó town and rural area of the municipality of Ataliva Roca, extending into the Utracán and Atreucó departments; the rural area of the municipality of Luan Toro (the rest extends into the Loventué and Conhelo departments); rural area of the municipality of Santa Rosa (the rest extends into the Capital department); and the rural area of the municipality of Carro Quemado (the rest extends into the Loventué department).

It has an area of 5,092 km². It borders the Conhelo department to the north, the Capital department to the northeast, the Atreucó department to the east, the Utracán department to the south, and the Loventué department to the west. The department can be accessed via National Route RN 35 and Provincial Routes RP 11, RP 12 and RP 14.

Within the Toay department lies Luro Park, one of the most visited provincial protected areas in La Pampa. Its main attractions are the observation of flora and fauna and the provincial historical monument El Castillo, a "château" built at the beginning of the 20th century by Pedro Olegario Luro Pradère.

== Demographics ==
The department had 18,029 inhabitants (INDEC, 2022), representing a 45.3% increase compared to the 12,409 inhabitants (INDEC, 2010) of the previous census. This figure earned it third place in the province by population and the highest intercensal growth rate in La Pampa.

== Economy ==
The Toay department is part of Microregion 6, one of the sectors into which the Ministry of Production of La Pampa virtually subdivided the province for the purpose of analyzing regional issues and defining and implementing development plans. The region is characterized by a high concentration of population in the cities of Toay and Santa Rosa, which currently form an urban agglomeration called Greater Santa Rosa. This situation results in an economic structure with a strong presence of the secondary (manufacturing) and tertiary (services) sectors. The primary sector is characterized by the production of cereals and oilseeds and cattle farming, generally on family farms of no more than 500 hectares.
