= 2013 Formula Renault seasons =

2013 Formula Renault

Seasons
- ← 2012 2014 →

This article describes all the 2013 seasons of Formula Renault series across the world.

== Formula Renault 2.0L ==
=== 2013 Pau Trophy ===
On 20 May 2013, first non-championship Pau Trophy for Formula Renault 2.0 was held. The main race was won by Prema Powerteam driver Luca Ghiotto.

No	Driver	Team	QR	R
10	(Italy) Luca Ghiotto	Prema Powerteam	10	1
5	(Russia) Egor Orudzhev	Tech 1 Racing	8	2
1	(United Kingdom) Jake Dennis	Fortec Motorsports	2	3
8	(United Kingdom) Oliver Rowland	Manor MP Motorsport	3	4
2	(United Kingdom) Matt Parry	Fortec Motorsports	1	5
11	(Brazil) Bruno Bonifacio	Prema Powerteam	5	6
7	(France) Pierre Gasly	Tech 1 Racing	7	7
14	(France) Tristan Papavoine	AV Formula	10	8
15	(France) Nicolas Pironneau	Formula Motorsport	12	9
6	(France) Matthieu Vaxivière	Tech 1 Racing	4	Ret
3	(Mexico) Alfonso Celis Jr.	Fortec Motorsports	9	Ret
16	(France) Marc Cattaneo	Formula Motorsport	11	Ret
No	Driver	Team	QR	R

== Formula Renault 1.6L ==
=== 2013 Formula Renault 1.6 NEC season ===
- Point system : 30, 24, 20, 17, 16, 15, 14, 13, 12, 11, 10, 9, 8, 7, 6, 5, 4, 3, 2, 1 for 20th. No points for Fastest lap or Pole position.
- Races : 2 race by rounds length of 20 minutes each.

Pos	No.	Driver	Team	(Netherlands) Zandvoort 20 May		(Netherlands) Assen 4 August		(Belgium) Zolder 21 September		(Germany) Nürburgring 28 September		(Netherlands) Zandvoort 13 October		(Netherlands) Assen 20 October		Points
Pos	No.	Driver	Team	1	2	3	4	5	6	7	8	9	10	11	12	Points
1	7	(Netherlands) Roy Geerts	Stuart Racing Team	1	4	**2**	1	**2**	**2**	3	3	1	2	5	1	289
2	9	(Estonia) Martin Rump	Scuderia Nordica	**2**	**1**	1	3	6	1	1	1	3	3	2	6	288
3	8	(Netherlands) Janneau Esmeijer	Provily Racing	4	5	9	2	1	3	**2**	**2**	4	14	6	5	222
4	5	(Netherlands) Larry ten Voorde	Van Amersfoort Racing (1–4); B&W Motorsport (5–12)	Ret	6	6	**4**	3	6	4	5	**2**	**1**	3	2	213
5	12	(New Zealand) Paul Blomqvist	Trackstar Racing	3	3	4	7			5	12	6	8	1	3	174
6	20	(Netherlands) Tommy van Erp	Van Amersfoort Racing	5	2	11	9	4	5	6	6	13	7	Ret	4	164
7	13	(Mexico) Pato O'Ward	Provily Racing					5	4	7	7	12	5	4	7	117
8	11	(Sweden) Pontus Fredricsson	Trackstar Racing	8	10	5	DNS			8	4	5	6	**Ret**	**10**	112
9	4	(Sweden) Lukas Sundahl	Sundahl Racing	6	8	3	6					8	9			88
10	18	(Sweden) Oliver Söderström	Scuderia Nordica			10	12			9	8	11	13			88
11	2	(Sweden) Otto Tjäder	KOAN Event Racing	11	11	12	10			12	9					83
12	17	(Belgium) Yaro Deckers	Stuart Racing Team	10	13	Ret	11	7	7	11	11					77
13	6	(Netherlands) Joel Affolter	Provily Racing (1–2); Stuart Racing Team (3–4)	7	7	8	8									54
14	1	(Netherlands) Paul Sieljes	Stuart Racing Team					8	8					7	8	53
15	10	(Estonia) Karl-Gustav Annus	Scuderia Nordica							10	10	14	11			39
16	16	(Netherlands) Wouter Boerekamps	Provily Racing			7	5									30
17	22	(Switzerland) Jan Schwitter	Walter Lechner Racing									9	4			29
18	21	(Austria) Florian Janits	Walter Lechner Racing									7	10			25
19	23	(Sweden) Kimmy Larsson	Supercar Experience	9	9											24
20	24	(Netherlands) Brian Kroon	Provily Racing									10	12			20
21	14	(Estonia) Marcus Kiisa	Scuderia Nordica	12	12											18

Colour	Result
Gold	Winner
Silver	2nd place
Bronze	3rd place
Green	Finished, in points
Green	Retired, in points
Blue	Finished, no points
Purple	Did not finish (Ret)
Purple	Not classified (NC)
Red	Did not qualify (DNQ)
Black	Disqualified (DSQ)
White	Did not start (DNS)
White	Withdrew (WD)
Blank	Did not participate
Blank	Injured (INJ)
Blank	Excluded (EX)
**Bold**	Pole position
*	Fastest lap
spr	Sprint Race
fea	Feature Race

== Other Formulas powered by Renault championships ==
=== 2013 Remus Formula Renault 2.0 Cup season ===
The season was held between 7 April and 11 September and raced across Austria, Germany and Czech Republic. The races occur with other categories as part of the Austria Formula 3 Cup, this section presents only the Austrian Formula Renault 2.0 classifications. Division II cars were built between 2000 and 2009.

Position	1st	2nd	3rd	4th	5th	6th	7th	8th	9th	10th
Points	25	18	15	12	10	8	6	4	2	1

Pos	Driver	Team	(Germany) HOC1 7 Apr		(Austria) RBR 12 May		(Germany) LAU 2 Jun		(Austria) SAL 7 Jul		(Germany) HOC2 28 Jul		(Czech Republic) MOS 11 Aug		(Germany) HOC3 12 Sept		Pts	Pts (Div. II)
1	(Poland) Jakub Śmiechowski	Inter Europol Competition			1	1			1	1			1	1			150	N/A
2	(Switzerland) Manuel Amweg	Equipe Bernoise	3	3	Ret	2			Ret		1	2			2	3	124	151
3	(Switzerland) Kurt Böhlen	bms Böhlen Motorsport									2	1	5	2	1	1	121	143
4	(Germany) Hartmut Bertsch	Conrad Racing Sport			3	3	1	1			Ret				Ret	4	92	105
5	(Czech Republic) Gabriela Jílková	Krenek Motorsport	2	2	2	4								DNS			66	N/A
6	(Slovakia) Christian Malcharek	Krenek Motorsport	1	1													50	N/A
7	(Germany) Severin Austerschmidt	Severin Austerschmidt									3	3					38	48
8	(Switzerland) Thomas Aregger	Thomas Aregger													3	2	33	33
9	(United States) Robert Siska	SL Formula Racing	4	4													24	N/A
=9	(Switzerland) Max Biedermann	Inter Europol Competition											4	4			24	N/A
11	(Germany) Bernd Scherer	Conrad Racing Sport													4	5	22	22
12	(Switzerland) David Freiburghaus	SBM Motorsport											2				18	N/A
13	(Switzerland) Steve Brodbeck	Daltec Racing spol s.r.o.											3				15	N/A
=13	(Germany) Simon Stoller	Krenek Motorsport												3			15	N/A
15	(Germany) Oliver Stark	Oliver Stark			4												12	18
16	(Germany) Frank Nowak	Frank Nowak	5	Ret													10	18
=16	(Germany) Helga Heinrich	Helga Heinrich			5												10	15

=== 2013 Formula Renault 2.0 Argentina season ===
All cars use Tito 02 chassis, all races were held in Argentina.

Position	1st	2nd	3rd	4th	5th	6th	7th	8th	9th	10th	Pole
Points	20	15	12	10	8	6	4	3	2	1	1

1 extra point in each race for regularly qualified drivers.

Pos	Driver	Team	RIC 10 Mar	ROS 21 Apr	ZON 12 May	PAM 2 Jun		OCA 23 Jun		RHO 14 Jul		JUN 10 Aug	SFE 1 Sept	GRN 22 Sept	SAN 10 Nov		SLU 1 Dec	Points
1	(Argentina) Julián Santero	Gabriel Werner Competición	1	1	2	1	1	2	1	1	1	1	?	1	1	1	1	234.5
2	(Argentina) Manuel Nicolas Luque	Litoral Group	11	2	1	19	2	1	16	2	2	6	?	2	3	2	3	139.5
3	(Argentina) Miguel Calamari	Gabriel Werner Competición	2	4	5	5	5	9	11	20	21	4	?	4	5	15	5	89
4	(Argentina) Guillermo Rey	Corsa Racing	12	7	6	11	15	18	7	3	5	18	?	7	2	3	4	73
5	(Argentina) Manuel Mallo	Corsa Racing	6	14	12	3	3	11	2	11	3	9	?	15	11	5	2	65.5
6	(Argentina) Marcelo Ciarrocchi	Croizet Racing	5	5	3	2	6	16	18	9	11	13	?	6	20	8		59.5
7	(Uruguay) Francisco Cammarota	Litoral Group Fórmula	13	10	10	8	11	12	4	12	8	3	?	16	4	4	8	56
8	(Chile) Felipe Schmauk	Litoral Group	3	3	15	17	7	20	15	18	19	12	?	3	9	14	13	51
9	(Argentina) Emiliano Marino	Gabriel Werner Competición	9	6	17	7	8	5	5	4	9	19	?	12	6	9	7	48.5
10	(Argentina) Alejandro Wagner	Werner Junior	7	12	7	4	14	14	8	13	10	5	?	5	7	10		47
11	(Argentina) Agustín Lima Capitao	Barobero Racing (?), Werner Junior (?)	15	19	4	18	10	17	3	5	6	20	?		8	6	10	43.5
12	(Argentina) Franco Geminiani	Werner Junior	4	8	20	9	9	7	14	7	15	15	?	14	13	13	12	31
13	(Argentina) Amadis Farina	JLS Motorsport	16	9	8	12	19	3	13	8	4	21	?					24.5
14	(Argentina) Federico Paoloni	Gabriel Werner Competición								6	7	8	?	13	10	16	4	21
15	(Argentina) Santiago Piovano	Litoral Group Fórmula	17		19	6	4			19	22	17	?	8	21	20		20
16	(Argentina) Fernando Ayala	Croizet Racing (?), Litoral Group Fórmula (?)	8	17	11	15	17	15		21	20	7	?	11	14	17	14	19
17	(Argentina) Carlos Javier Merlo	Corsa Racing										2	?					17
18	(Argentina) Nicolás Dominici	Osdom Racing	14	18	13	13	12	4	10	10	13	16				19		15
19	(Argentina) Andres Nestor Barovero	Barovero Racing Team						6	6									7
20	(Argentina) Pedro Sabella	JLS Motorsport	10	13	14	16	16			15	17							6
21	(Colombia) Juan David Lopez	JLS Motorsport													15	7		6
22	(Chile) Pablo Donoso Prado	Bouvier Racing		11	9	14	18											5
23	(Colombia) Camilo Forero Vásquez	JLS Motorsport						10	9								9	4.5
24	(Chile) Sebastian Valenzuela	Basco Racing Team			16			19	12		14	14						4
25	(Argentina) Hernán Satler	Werner Competición												9				3
26	(Argentina) Agustín Chourrout	RCH Motosport		16	18							22						3
27	(Argentina) Gino Bernardelli	Croizet Racing												10	18			3
28	(Argentina) Ayrton Reutemann	Barovero Racing Team								16	18				19	12		3
29	(Chile) Maximiliano Matías Soto Zurita	Corsa Racing													16	18	11	3
30	(Argentina) Marcelo Lisandro Ferreyra	JLS Motorsport													17	11		3
31	(Argentina) Nicolás Meichtri	HRC Pro Team						8	19									2.5
32	(Argentina) Lucas Pérsico	Bouvier Racing										10						2
33	(Ecuador) Mateo Fernandez	JLS Motorsport						13	17	14	16							2
34	(Argentina) Federico Cavagnero	Osdom Racing								17	12	11						2
35	(Argentina) Federico Moises	Croizet Racing				10	13											1.5
36	(Argentina) Emmanuel Cáceres	Litoral Group Fórmula.		20														1
37	(Argentina) Horacio Alvigini	Werner Junior		15														1
Pos	Driver	Team	RIC	ROS	ZON	PAM		OCA		RHO		JUN	SFE	GRN	SAN		SLU	Points
