= Teo Schropp =

Argentine racing driver (born 2009)

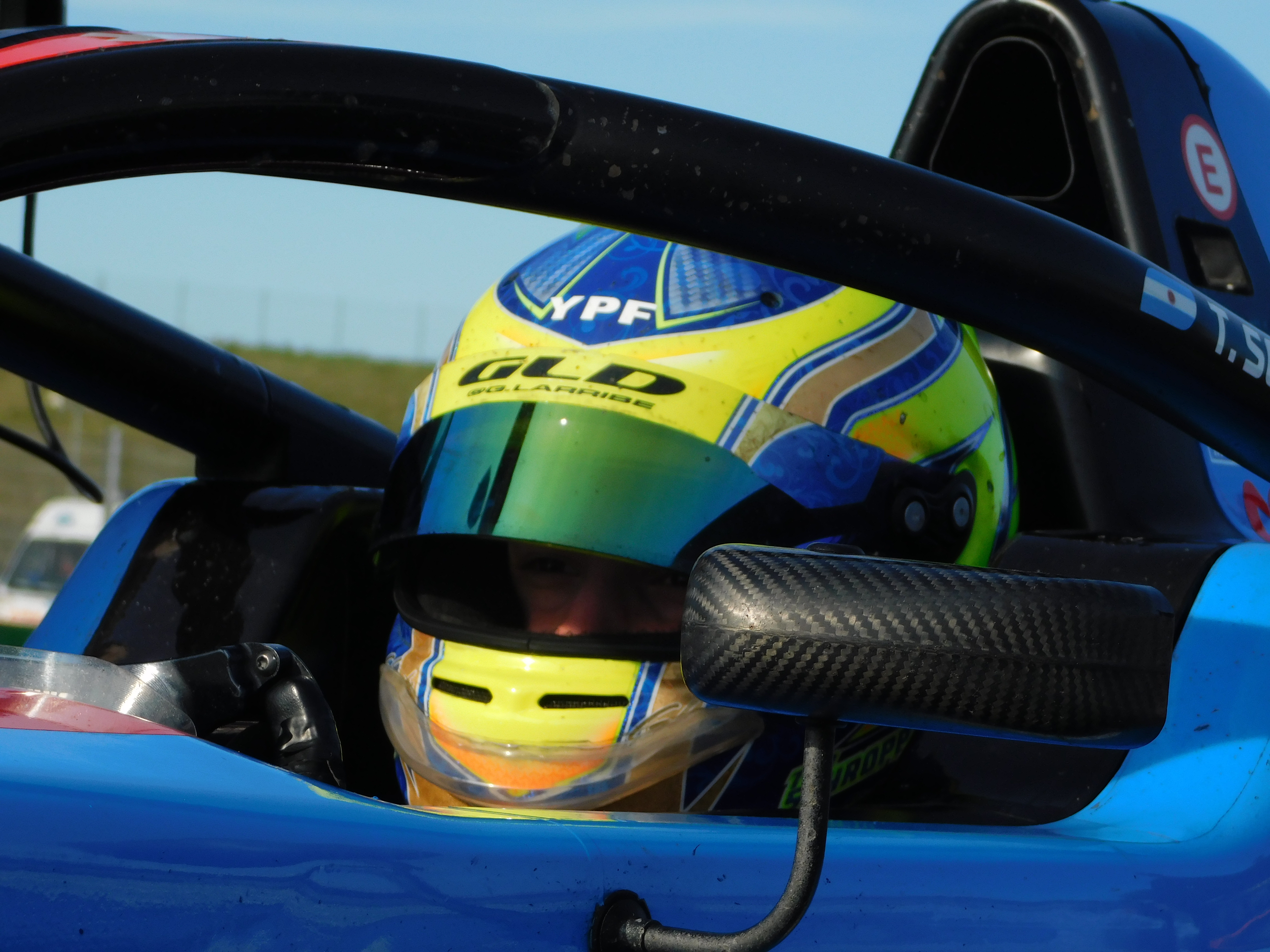
- Schropp in 2025
- Nationality: (Argentina) Argentine
- Born: 14 February 2009 (age 17) San Fernando, Buenos Aires, Argentina

Italian F4 Championship career
- Debut season: 2025
- Current team: Jenzer Motorsport
- Car number: 21
- Starts: 20
- Wins: 0
- Podiums: 0
- Poles: 0
- Fastest laps: 0
- Best finish: 25th in 2025

Teo Schropp (born 14 February 2009) is an Argentine racing driver who last competed for Jenzer Motorsport in the Italian F4 Championship and E4 Championship.

== Career ==
Schropp began karting in 2016, competing until 2023. In his karting career, he most notably won the 2023 Argentine Karting Championship in the Codasur Junior class.

Stepping up to single-seaters in 2024, Schropp joined Gabriel Werner Competición to compete in Fórmula 2 Argentina. Racing with the team through the first three rounds, Schropp took a best result of tenth at Viedma, before switching to LR Team from the round at Posadas onwwards. Racing with them for the following five rounds, Schropp took a best result of fifth at Posadas and La Plata, before leaving the team and series to test Formula 4 machinery with Jenzer Motorsport in Europe.

In 2025, Schropp joined Jenzer Motorsport to race in both the Italian F4 and E4 Championships. Starting off the Italian season with a 14th-place finish at Misano, Schropp then scored his maiden season points at Vallelunga by finishing fifth in race three and tenth in race four. In the following two rounds, Schropp only took best results of 15th at Monza and 21st at Mugello, before returning to the points at Imola by finishing race three in tenth. After scoring a best result of 15th at Barcelona, Schropp scored his final point of the season at Misano by finishing tenth in race one and ending the year 25th in the standings. In E4, Schropp started the season with two 14th-place finishes at Le Castellet, before scoring two top-15 finishes in the following round at Mugello to end the season 30th in points. During 2025, Schropp also partook in the Red Bull Ring round of the Formula 4 CEZ Championship with the same team, in which he took a best result of fourth in race two.

== Racing record ==
=== Racing career summary ===
Season	Series	Team	Races	Wins	Poles	F/Laps	Podiums	Points	Position
2024	Fórmula 2 Argentina	Gabriel Werner Competición	4	0	0	0	0	121	13th
2024	Fórmula 2 Argentina	LR Team	10	0	0	0	0	121	13th
2025	Formula 4 CEZ Championship	Jenzer Motorsport	3	0	0	0	0	12	19th
2025	Italian F4 Championship	Jenzer Motorsport	20	0	0	0	0	13	25th
2025	E4 Championship	Jenzer Motorsport	7	0	0	0	0	0	30th

=== Complete Formula 4 CEZ Championship results ===
(key) (Races in bold indicate pole position) (Races in italics indicate fastest lap)

Year	Team	1	2	3	4	5	6	7	8	9	10	11	12	13	14	15	16	17	18	DC	Points
2025	Jenzer Motorsport	RBR1; 1; 19	RBR1; 2; 4	RBR1; 3; 18	RBR2; 1	RBR2; 2	RBR2; 3	SAL; 1	SAL; 2	SAL; 3	MOS; 1	MOS; 2	MOS; 3	SVK; 1	SVK; 2	SVK; 3	BRN; 1	BRN; 2	BRN; 3	19th	12

=== Complete Italian F4 Championship results ===
(key) (Races in bold indicate pole position; races in italics indicate fastest lap)

Year	Team	1	2	3	4	5	6	7	8	9	10	11	12	13	14	15	16	17	18	19	20	21	22	23	24	25	DC	Points
2025	Jenzer Motorsport	MIS1; 1; 24	MIS1; 2	MIS1; 3; 14	MIS1; 4; 30	VLL; 1; 11	VLL; 2	VLL; 3; 5	VLL; 4; 10	MNZ; 1; 15	MNZ; 2; 36†	MNZ; 3; 19	MUG; 1; 22	MUG; 2; 21	MUG; 3; 24	IMO; 1; 31	IMO; 2 C	IMO; 3; 10	CAT; 1; 15	CAT; 2; 16	CAT; 3 C	MIS2; 1; 10	MIS2; 2	MIS2; 3; 21	MIS2; 4; 33†	MIS2; 5; 28	25th	13

=== Complete E4 Championship results ===
(key) (Races in bold indicate pole position; races in italics indicate fastest lap)

Year	Team	1	2	3	4	5	6	7	8	9	DC	Points
2025	Jenzer Motorsport	LEC; 1; 14	LEC; 2; 17	LEC; 3; 14	MUG; 1 Ret	MUG; 2; 15	MUG; 3; 14	MNZ; 1 Ret	MNZ; 2 DNS	MNZ; 3 DNS	30th	0

^{*} Season still in progress.
