= Autódromo Provincia de La Pampa =

Motor sports racing circuit

- Full Circuit (2012–present)
- Location: Toay, La Pampa, Argentina
- Coordinates: 36°43′44.45″S 64°20′57.14″W
- Capacity: 75,000
- Broke ground: May 2011; 15 years ago
- Opened: 11 November 2012; 13 years ago
- Major events: Current: TC2000 Championship (2013–2016, 2021, 2026); Top Race V6 (2013–2014, 2026); Former: Turismo Carretera (2012–2019, 2021–2025); Turismo Nacional (2012–2019, 2021–2023); TC Mouras (2017–2019, 2023)

Full Circuit (2012–present)
- Length: 4.148 km (2.577 mi)
- Turns: 8
- Race lap record: 1:14.360 ( (Argentina) Mariano Werner, Ford Mustang Mach 1, 2025, TC)

Short Circuit (2012–present)
- Length: 3.402 km (2.114 mi)
- Turns: 5
- Race lap record: 1:05.097 ( (Argentina) Marcelo Ciarrocchi, Fiat Pulse, 2026, TC2000)

The Autódromo Provincia de La Pampa is a 4.148 km (2.577 mi) motor sports racing circuit in the town of Toay, in the La Pampa Province of Argentina, about 10 km (6.2 mi) from the provincial capital, Santa Rosa.

== Events ==
Current

- March: Turismo Carretera 2000, Turismo Pista
- June: Top Race V6, Fórmula Nacional Argentina
- August: TC2000 Championship, Fórmula Nacional Argentina
- October: TC2000 Championship, Fórmula Nacional Argentina

Former

- TC Mouras (2017–2019, 2023)
- TC Pista Mouras (2017–2019, 2023)
- Turismo Carretera (2012–2019, 2021–2025)
- Turismo Carretera Pista (2012–2019, 2021–2025)
- Turismo Nacional (2012–2019, 2021–2023)

== Lap records ==
As of October 2026, the fastest official race lap records at the Autódromo Provincia de La Pampa are listed as:

| Category | Time | Driver | Vehicle | Event |
Full Circuit (2012–present): 4.148 km (2.577 mi)
| Turismo Carretera | 1:14.360 | Mariano Werner | Ford Mustang Mach 1 | 2025 2nd Toay Turismo Carretera round |
| Súper TC2000 | 1:14.895 | Emiliano Spataro | Renault Fluence | 2013 Toay Súper TC2000 round |
| Turismo Carretera 2000 | 1:17.857 | Camilo Trappa | Renault Fluence | 2025 Toay Turismo Carretera 2000 round |
| Formula Renault 2.0 | 1:18.626 | Julián Santero | Tito F4-A | 2013 Toay Formula Renault Argentina round |
Short Circuit (2012–present): 3.402 km (2.114 mi)
| TC2000 | 1:05.097 | Marcelo Ciarrocchi | Fiat Pulse | 2026 2nd Toay TC2000 round |
| Formula Renault 2.0 | 1:12.411 | Alejandro Guttlein | Tito F4-A | 2026 2nd Toay Fórmula Nacional Argentina round |
