= Autódromo Eduardo Copello =

Argentine motorsports circuit

- Full Circuit (2000–present)
- Location: Quebrada de Zonda, San Juan, San Juan Province
- Coordinates: 31°33′14.3″S 68°41′39.5″W
- Opened: 8 October 1967; 58 years ago
- Major events: Current: TC2000 (1981–1982, 1984, 1987, 1993–1994, 1996–1998, 2000–2009, 2011–2014, 2016–2019, 2025–present); Top Race V6 (2004–2011, 2016–2019, 2026); Former: Turismo Nacional (1967–1970, 1972–1977, 1979–1981, 1984–1985, 1991, 1995, 2019); Turismo Carretera (1968); F3 Sudamericana (1994)

Full Circuit (2000–present)
- Length: 3.245 km (2.016 mi)
- Turns: 16
- Race lap record: 1:11.290 ( (Argentina) José María López, Ford Focus II, 2012, Súper TC2000)

Original Circuit (1967–present)
- Length: 3.230 km (2.007 mi)
- Turns: 16
- Race lap record: 1:08.300 ( (Austria) Jochen Rindt, Brabham BT23C, 1968, F2)

Autódromo Eduardo Copello, better known as El Zonda, is a 3.245 km (2.016 mi) motorsports circuit located in the defile Quebrada de Zonda in San Juan, Argentina. Mainly known for hosting TC 2000/Súper TC 2000 races, but there have also been Top Race V6, Turismo Nacional and other national series at this circuit.

El Zonda was inaugurated in 1967 and today it receive his name in honor of the driver Eduardo Copello, born in San Juan.

== Lap records ==
As of May 2013, the fastest official race lap records at the Autódromo Eduardo Copello are listed as:

Category	Time	Driver	Vehicle	Event
Full Circuit (2000–present): 3.245 km (2.016 mi)
Súper TC2000	1:11.290	José María López	Ford Focus II	2012 El Zonda Súper TC2000 round
Formula Renault 2.0	1:13.600	Julián Santero	Tito F4-A	2013 El Zonda Formula Renault Argentina round
Original Circuit (1967–present): 3.230 km (2.007 mi)
Formula Two	1:08.300	Jochen Rindt	Brabham BT23C	1968 El Zonda F2 round
TC2000	1:11.165	Juan María Traverso	Honda Civic VI	1998 2nd El Zonda TC2000 round
