= Toay =

- Town
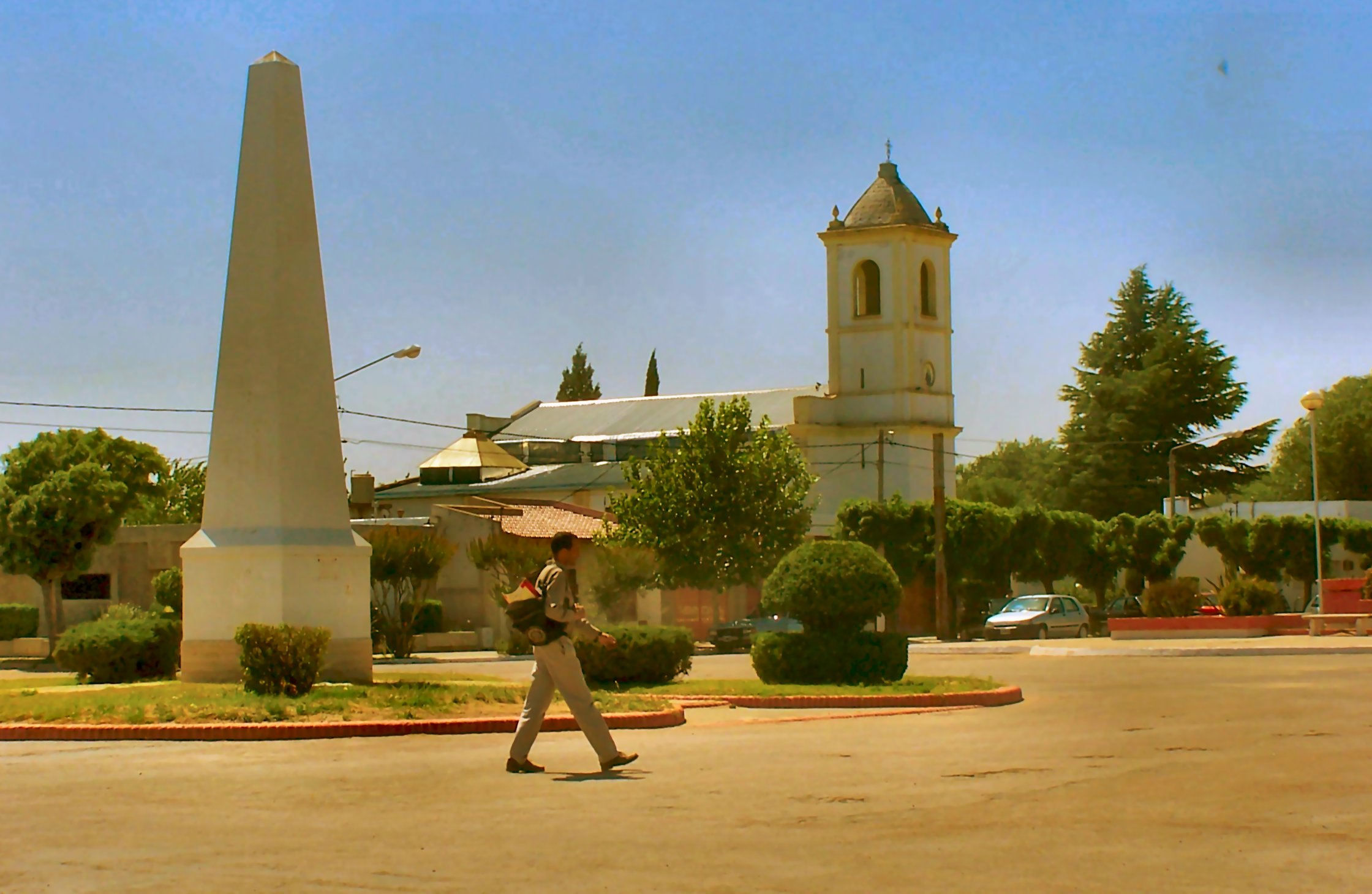

- Flag Coat of arms

- Location within Argentina
- Coordinates: 36°40′S 64°21′W
- Country: Argentina
- Province: La Pampa
- Department: Toay
- Time zone: UTC−3 (ART)

Toay is a town in La Pampa Province in Argentina. It is the capital of the Toay Department.
