= List of motor racing tracks in Africa =

This is a list of African auto racing and moto racing circuits sorted by country.

Note: Circuits carrying a "†" were, are, or will be hosting Formula One and/or MotoGP Grand Prix.

== Algeria ==
=== Temporary circuits ===
==== Defunct ====
- Circuit Automobile d'Arcole, Bir El Djir
- Circuit de Bouzaréah, Bouzaréah
- Circuit Urbain de Staouéli, Staouéli

== Angola ==
=== Permanent circuits ===
- Autódromo de Luanda, Luanda

==== Defunct ====
- Autódromo de Benguela, Benguela

=== Temporary circuits ===
==== Defunct ====
- Circuito Antigo de Carmona, Uíge
- Circuito Automóvel das Festas do Mar, Moçâmedes
- Circuito da Fortaleza, Luanda
- Circuito de Nova Lisboa, Huambo
- Circuito de Novo Redondo, Sumbe
- Circuito Novo de Carmona, Uíge

== Democratic Republic of the Congo ==
=== Defunct ===
- Grand Prix de Léopoldville, Léopoldville

== Egypt ==
=== Defunct ===
- El Gezira Park Track, Gezira, Cairo

== Eritrea ==
=== Defunct ===
- Circuit of Asmara, Asmara

== Ethiopia ==
=== Defunct ===
- Addis Ababa City Circuit, Kebena, Addis Ababa
- Mekanisa Track, Mekanisa, Addis Ababa

== Kenya ==
=== Defunct ===
- Nakuru Motor Racing Circuit (aka Langalanga), Gilgil, Nakuru

== Libya ==
=== Defunct ===
- Autodromo della Mellaha, Tripoli

== Morocco ==
- Circuit de Vitesse Sidi Daoui Oued Zem, Oued Zem
- Circuit International Automobile Moulay El Hassan, Marrakesh

=== Defunct ===
†	Formula One GP Venue	Ain-Diab Circuit, Ain Diab, Casablanca-Settat

- Anfa Circuit, Casablanca, Casablanca-Settat
- Circuit Automobile de Kénitra, Kenitra, Rabat-Salé-Kénitra
- Circuit d'Agadir, Agadir, Souss-Massa
- La Corniche, Casablanca, Casablanca-Settat
- Mohammedia, Mohammedia, Casablanca-Settat

== Mozambique ==
- Autódromo Internacional de Maputo, Maputo

=== Defunct ===
- Circuito da Beira, Beira, Sofala
- Lourenço Marques street circuit, Maputo

== Namibia ==
=== Permanent tracks ===
- Tony Rust Raceway, Windhoek, Khomas Region

=== Oval tracks ===
- Walvis Bay Motorsport Park, Walvis Bay, Erongo

== Nigeria ==
- Evbuobanosa Motorsport Raceway, Evbuobanosa, Edo State

== Senegal ==
- Circuit de Dakar Baobabs, Thiès Region

== South Africa ==
=== Permanent tracks ===
- Aldo Scribante Circuit, Gqeberha
- Dezzi Raceway, Port Shepstone
- Fast5 Motorsport Raceway, Alberton
- Killarney Motor Racing Complex (WPMC), Cape Town

†	Formula One GP Venue; MotoGP GP Venue	Kyalami, Gauteng

- Mahem Raceway, Pretoria
- Midvaal Raceway (previously Race-Rite Raceway), Gauteng

†	MotoGP GP Venue	Phakisa Freeway, Welkom

- Polokwane Racetrack, Limpopo

†	Formula One GP Venue	Prince George Circuit, East London

- Red Star Raceway, Delmas
- The Rock Raceway, Brakpan
- Zwartkops Raceway, Gauteng

==== Defunct ====
- Blue Circle Raceway, Lichtenburg
- Brandkop Circuit, Bloemfontein
- Gosforth Park, Germiston
- Grand Central Circuit, Midrand
- Roy Hesketh Circuit, Pietermaritzburg
- WesBank Raceway, Gauteng

=== Temporary circuits ===
==== Defunct ====
- Alexandra Park Street Circuit, Pietermaritzburg
- Cape Town Street Circuit, Cape Town
- Durban Street Circuit, Durban
- Germiston Street Circuit, Germiston
- Gunner's Circle, Cape Town
- Paarden Eiland Circuit, Paarden Eiland
- Palmietfontein Circuit, Katlehong
- Sacks Circle Circuit, Cape Town

=== Hillclimbs ===
- Knysna Simola Hillclimb, Knysna

=== Drag strips ===
- Tarlton International Raceway, Krugersdorp

== Tunisia ==
=== Defunct ===
- Carthage Street Circuit, Tunis
- Circuito du Belvedere, Belvedere Park, Tunis
- Le Bardo Street Circuit, Le Bardo

== Zambia ==
=== Permanent circuits ===
- Lawrence Allen Circuit, Chingola
- Ndola Motopark, Ndola

=== Dirt track ovals ===
==== Defunct ====
- Bennetts Speedway, Kitwe

== Zimbabwe ==
=== Permanent circuits ===
- Breedon Everard Raceway, Bulawayo
- Donnybrook Raceway, Harare

==== Defunct ====
- James McNeillie Circuit, Bulawayo

=== Temporary circuits ===
==== Defunct ====
- Belvedere Airport Circuit, Belvedere
- Heany Junction Circuit, Matabeleland North
- Saxon Wood Circuit, Mutare

== See also ==
- List of motor racing tracks
- List of motor racing tracks in Asia
