= South African Springbok Championship Series =

The South African Springbok Championship Series (known as the Shell Drivers Cup in 1970 and the Castrol Springbok Series in 1971) was a sports car racing series based in Southern Africa. The series ran from 1965 until 1973. The series was cancelled after two rounds of the 1973 season due to the oil crisis, and never returned. The series' signature event was the Kyalami 9 Hours. The series was frequented by European teams and drivers, as it took place in November and December after the World Sportscar Championship and Can-Am seasons. The series did not crown a champion among drivers.

== Seasons ==
=== 1965 ===
Date	Circuit	Location	Winning driver(s)	Winning car
6 November	Kyalami	Halfway House, South Africa	(United Kingdom) David Piper (United Kingdom) Richard Attwood	Ferrari 365 P2/3
28 November	James McNeillie Circuit	Bulawayo, Rhodesia	(United Kingdom) Peter Sutcliffe	Ford GT40
27 December	Roy Hesketh Circuit	Pietermaritzburg, South Africa	(United Kingdom) Peter Sutcliffe	Ford GT40

=== 1966 ===
Date	Circuit	Location	Winning driver(s)	Winning car
5 November	Kyalami	Halfway House, South Africa	(United Kingdom) David Piper (United Kingdom) Richard Attwood	Ferrari 365 P2/3
19 November	Killarney Racing Circuit	Cape Town, South Africa	(United Kingdom) David Piper	Ferrari 365 P2/3
17 December	Circuito de Lourenço Marques	Lourenço Marques, Mozambique	(United Kingdom) Roy Pierpoint	Lola T70
27 December	Roy Hesketh Circuit	Pietermaritzburg, South Africa	(United Kingdom) Mike Hailwood (United Kingdom) David Hobbs	Ford GT40

=== 1967 ===
Date	Circuit	Location	Winning driver(s)	Winning car
4 November	Kyalami	Halfway House, South Africa	(Belgium) Jacky Ickx (United Kingdom) Brian Redman	Mirage M1
18 November	Killarney Racing Circuit	Cape Town, South Africa	(Australia) Paul Hawkins	Lola T70
16 December	Circuito de Lourenço Marques	Lourenço Marques, Mozambique	(Australia) Paul Hawkins	Lola T70
26 December	Roy Hesketh Circuit	Pietermaritzburg, South Africa	(South Africa) Doug Serrurier (South Africa) Jackie Pretorius	Lola T70

=== 1968 ===
Date	Circuit	Location	Winning driver(s)	Winning car
9 November	Kyalami	Halfway House, South Africa	(Belgium) Jacky Ickx (United Kingdom) David Hobbs	Mirage M1
18 November	Killarney Racing Circuit	Cape Town, South Africa	(Australia) Paul Hawkins	Ferrari 330 P4
8 December	Circuito de Lourenço Marques	Lourenço Marques, Mozambique	(United Kingdom) Mike Hailwood (United Kingdom) Malcolm Guthrie	Mirage M1
26 December	Roy Hesketh Circuit	Pietermaritzburg, South Africa	(Australia) Paul Hawkins	Ferrari 330 P4 Spyder
1 January 1969	Prince George Circuit	East London, South Africa	(Australia) Paul Hawkins	Ferrari 330 P4

=== 1969 ===
Date	Circuit	Location	Winning driver(s)	Winning car
8 November	Kyalami	Halfway House, South Africa	(United Kingdom) David Piper (United Kingdom) Richard Attwood	Porsche 917
22 November	Killarney Racing Circuit	Cape Town, South Africa	(United Kingdom) Mike de Udy (Australia) Paul Hawkins	Lola T70
5 December	Circuito de Lourenço Marques	Lourenço Marques, Mozambique	(United Kingdom) Mike de Udy (Australia) Paul Hawkins	Lola T70
13 December	James McNeillie Circuit	Bulawayo, Rhodesia	(Rhodesia) John Love	Lola T70
27 December	Roy Hesketh Circuit	Pietermaritzburg, South Africa	(Rhodesia) John Love	Lola T70

=== 1970 ===
Date	Circuit	Location	Winning driver(s)	Winning car
7 November	Kyalami	Halfway House, South Africa	(Belgium) Jacky Ickx (Italy) Ignazio Giunti	Ferrari 512 M
21 November	Killarney Racing Circuit	Cape Town, South Africa	(United Kingdom) Brian Redman (United Kingdom) Richard Attwood	Chevron B16 Spyder
5 December	Circuito de Lourenço Marques	Lourenço Marques, Mozambique	(United Kingdom) Brian Redman	Chevron B16 Spyder
13 December	James McNeillie Circuit	Bulawayo, Rhodesia	(United Kingdom) Brian Redman (Rhodesia) John Love	Chevron B16 Spyder
27 December	Roy Hesketh Circuit	Pietermaritzburg, South Africa	(United Kingdom) Brian Redman	Chevron B16 Spyder
2 January 1971	Goldfields Raceway	Welkom, South Africa	(United Kingdom) Brian Redman (United Kingdom) Richard Attwood	Chevron B16 Spyder

=== 1971 ===
Date	Circuit	Location	Winning driver(s)	Winning car
6 November	Kyalami	Halfway House, South Africa	(Switzerland) Clay Regazzoni (United Kingdom) Brian Redman	Ferrari 312 PB
20 November	Killarney Racing Circuit	Cape Town, South Africa	(Austria) Helmut Marko (Rhodesia) John Love	Lola T212
28 November	Circuito de Lourenço Marques	Lourenço Marques, Mozambique	(Netherlands) Ed Swart (South Africa) Jody Scheckter	Chevron B19
5 December	James McNeillie Circuit	Bulawayo, Rhodesia	(United Kingdom) Mike Hailwood (South Africa) Paddy Driver	Chevron B19
11 December	Goldfields Raceway	Welkom, South Africa	(United Kingdom) John Hine (South Africa) Dave Charlton	Chevron B19
27 December	Roy Hesketh Circuit	Pietermaritzburg, South Africa	(Rhodesia) John Love	Lola T212

=== 1972 ===
Date	Circuit	Location	Winning driver(s)	Winning car
4 November	Kyalami	Halfway House, South Africa	(Switzerland) Clay Regazzoni (Italy) Arturo Merzario	Ferrari 312 PB
18 November	Killarney Racing Circuit	Cape Town, South Africa	(United Kingdom) Gerry Birrell (West Germany) Jochen Mass	Chevron B21; Chevron B23
26 November	Circuito de Lourenço Marques	Lourenço Marques, Mozambique	(United Kingdom) Gerry Birrell (West Germany) Jochen Mass	Chevron B21; Chevron B23
2 December	Goldfields Raceway	Welkom, South Africa	(United Kingdom) Gerry Birrell (United Kingdom) Peter Gethin	Chevron B21; Chevron B23
17 December	Roy Hesketh Circuit	Pietermaritzburg, South Africa	(United Kingdom) Peter Gethin (West Germany) Jochen Mass	Chevron B21; Chevron B23

=== 1973 ===
Date	Circuit	Location	Winning driver(s)	Winning car
3 November	Kyalami	Halfway House, South Africa	(West Germany) Reinhold Joest (Switzerland) Herbert Müller	Porsche 908/3
17 November	Killarney Racing Circuit	Cape Town, South Africa	(United Kingdom) John Watson (South Africa) Ian Scheckter	Chevron B26
1 December	Goldfields Raceway	Welkom, South Africa	canceled due to 1973 oil crisis	
9 December	Breedon Everard Raceway	Bulawayo, Rhodesia	canceled due to 1973 oil crisis	
