= List of motor racing tracks in Asia =

This is a list of Asian auto racing and moto racing circuits sorted by country.

Note: Circuits carrying a "†" were, are, or will be hosting Formula One and/or MotoGP Grand Prix.

== Armenia ==
=== Under construction ===
- Yeghvard Motorsport Complex, Yeghvard

== Azerbaijan ==
†	Formula One GP Venue	Baku City Circuit, Baku

=== Defunct ===
- Baku World Challenge, Baku

== Bahrain ==
†	Formula One GP Venue	Bahrain International Circuit, Bahrain

== Cambodia ==
- Yamamoto Circuit Cambodia, Phumĭ Snhák, Kampong Speu

== China ==
=== Permanent circuits ===
- Chengdu Tianfu International Circuit, Tianfu New Area
- Goldenport Park Circuit, Beijing
- Guangdong International Circuit, Zhaoqing
- Guizhou Junchi International Circuit, Guizhou
- Jiangsu Wantrack International Circuit, Nanjing
- Ningbo International Circuit, Beilun
- Ordos International Circuit, Ordos City
- Pinggu Haigu Car Park, Pinggu

†	Formula One GP Venue; MotoGP GP Venue	Shanghai International Circuit

- Shanghai Tianma Circuit, Shanghai
- Shougang Motorsport Valley, Qinhuangdao
- V1 Auto World Tianjin, Tianjin
- Xi'an Automobile University Track, Xi'an
- Xiamen International Circuit, Xiamen
- Zhejiang International Circuit, Shaoxing
- Zhengzhou International Autodrome, Zhengzhou
- Zhuhai International Circuit, Zhuhai
- Zhuzhou International Circuit, Zhuzhou

==== Defunct ====
- Chengdu Goldenport Circuit, Chengdu

=== Active ===
- Beijing E-Town Street Circuit, Beijing
- Sanya Street Circuit, Sanya
- Pingtan Ruyi Lake International City Circuit, Pingtan

==== Defunct ====
- Beijing International Street Circuit, Beijing
- Beijing Olympic Green Circuit, Beijing
- Jingkai Street Circuit, Beijing
- Qingdao Street Circuit, Qingdao
- Shanghai Street Circuit, Shanghai
- Wuhan Street Circuit, Wuhan
- Yancheng Street Circuit, Yancheng
- Zhuhai Street Circuit, Zhuhai

== Georgia ==
- Rustavi International Motorpark, Rustavi

== Hong Kong ==
- Hong Kong Central Harbourfront Circuit, Central Harbourfront

== India ==
=== Permanent circuits ===
†	Formula One GP Venue; MotoGP GP Venue	Buddh International Circuit, Greater Noida

- Madras International Circuit, Irungattukottai, Chennai
- Kari Motor Speedway, Coimbatore
- CoASTT High Performance Centre, Coimbatore

=== Street circuits ===
- Hyderabad Street Circuit, Hyderabad
- Chennai City Circuit, Chennai

==== Defunct ====
- Pune Street Circuit, Pune
- Sholavaram Airstrip, Chennai

=== New Racetracks (Under Construction) ===
- Nanoli Speedway, Pune
- Marque One, Kotapally
- Pista Motor Raceway, Hyderabad

== Indonesia ==
=== Permanent circuits ===
- Balipat Circuit, Tapin
- Bongohulawa Circuit, Gorontalo
- Boyolali City Circuit, Boyolali
- Bumi Rahayu Circuit, Bulungan
- Bukit Peusar Circuit, Tasikmalaya
- Cibatu Circuit, Majalengka
- Gelora Bung Tomo Circuit, Surabaya
- Gery-Mang Circuit, Subang
- Jaya Abadi Circuit, Lampung
- Jhonlin Circuit, Tanah Bumbu
- Kota Batik Circuit, Pekalongan
- Kuala Tungkal Circuit, East Tanjung Jabung
- Lanay Jaya Circuit, East Kutai
- Marido Circuit, Tabalong
- Mijen Circuit, Semarang
- Nanga-Nanga Circuit, Southeast Sulawesi
- Padang Panjang Manna Circuit, Bengkulu
- Pancing IMI Circuit, Medan
- Rumpin Circuit, Bogor
- Sabaru Circuit, Pontianak
- Kalan Circuit, Samarinda
- Sawahlunto Circuit, Sawahlunto
- Selagalas Circuit, Mataram City

†	MotoGP GP Venue	Sentul International Circuit, Bogor

- Soewondo Air Force Base Circuit, Medan
- Sirkuit Manggul, Lahat
- Sirkuit Puncak Mario, Sidenreng Rappang
- Skyland Circuit, Musi Banyuasin
- Sport Center GOR Wergu, Kudus City
- Sumber Alam Circuit, Purworejo
- Tembong Jaya Circuit, Serang
- Temindung Airport Circuit, Samarinda
- Widuri Beach Circuit, Pemalang

=== Temporary circuits ===
- Bandungan Convention Center, Semarang
- BSD City Street Circuit, BSD City, South Tangerang
- East Aceh Regency Government Centre Circuit, East Aceh
- Jakarta International e-Prix Circuit, Ancol, North Jakarta
- Kajen City Square Street Track, Pekalongan
- Kebumen Square Circuit, Kebumen

†	MotoGP GP Venue	Mandalika International Street Circuit, Central Lombok

- Purbalingga Square Circuit, Purbalingga
- Saleh Basarah Air Base Circuit, Bogor
- Satria Sports Hall Circuit, Banyumas
- Tegal Square Circuit, Tegal
- Wonosobo Square Circuit, Wonosobo

=== Defunct ===
- Jaya Ancol Circuit, Ancol, Jakarta
- Ria Kenjeran Park Circuit, Surabaya
- Lippo Village Street Circuit, Tangerang

== Iran ==
- Azadi Circuit, Tehran
- Tehran International Autodrome, Tehran

== Israel ==
=== Permanent circuits ===
- ARAD Racing Track, Arad
- MotorCity Motorpark Racing Circuit, Beersheba
- Peza'el Circuit, Yifat

==== Defunct ====
- Formula Israel Circuit, Eilat

=== Temporary circuits ===
==== Defunct ====
- Barnea Beach Street Circuit, Ashkelon

== Japan ==
=== Permanent circuits ===
- Asama Kazan, Tsumagoi, Gunma Prefecture
- Asan Circuit, Miyoshi District, Tokushima, Tokushima Prefecture, Shikoku
- Autopolis, Hita District, Ōita Prefecture
- Central Circuit, Taka District, Hyōgo Prefecture
- Ebisu Circuit, Nihonmatsu, Fukushima Prefecture,

†	Formula One GP Venue; MotoGP GP Venue	Fuji Speedway, Oyama, Shizuoka Prefecture

- Honda Safety & Riding Plaza Kyūshū, Kikuchi District, Kumamoto Prefecture
- Kikugawa Test Course, Kikugawa, Shizuoka Prefecture
- Maze Sea Circuit, Nishikanbara District, Niigata Prefecture
- Nasu Motor Sports Land, Kuroiso, Tokushima, Tochigi Prefecture
- Nakayama Circuit, Wake District, Okayama Prefecture
- Nikko Circuit, Utsunomiya, Tochigi Prefecture

†	Formula One GP Venue	Okayama International Circuit, Aida, Okayama Prefecture

- Sodegaura Forest Raceway, Sodegaura, Chiba Prefecture
- Sportsland SUGO, Murata, Miyagi Prefecture
- Sportsland Yamanashi, Nirasaki, Yamanashi Prefecture
- SPA Naoiri, Naoiri, Ōita Prefecture
- Spa Nishiura Motor Park, Gamagōri, Aichi Prefecture

†	Formula One GP Venue; MotoGP GP Venue	Suzuka Circuit, Suzuka, Mie Prefecture

- Takasu Circuit, Fukui, Fukui Prefecture
- The Magarigawa Club, Minamibōsō, Chiba Prefecture
- Tokachi International Speedway, Sarabetsu, Hokkaido
- Tsukuba Circuit, Shimotsuma, Ibaraki Prefecture

†	MotoGP GP Venue	Twin Ring Motegi, Motegi, Tochigi Prefecture

- Yamaha Motorcycle Test Course, Fukuroi, Shizuoka Prefecture

==== Defunct ====
- Hokkaido Speed Park, Kutchan, Abuta District, Shiribeshi, Hokkaido
- Inagawa Circuit, Inagawa, Kawabe District, Hyōgo Prefecture
- Mazda Mine Proving Ground, Mine, Yamaguchi Prefecture
- Mount Noro Speed Park, Kure, Hiroshima Prefecture
- Sendai Hi-Land Raceway, Aoba-ku, Sendai, Miyagi Prefecture
- Shiraoi Car Land, Shiraoi, Hokkaido Prefecture
- Tamagawa Speedway, Kawasaki City, Kanagawa Prefecture
- Yatabe Test Track, Tsukuba, Ibaraki Prefecture

=== Temporary circuits ===
- Tokyo Street Circuit, Tokyo Prefecture

== Jordan ==
- Manja International Circuit, Amman

== Kazakhstan ==
†	MotoGP GP Venue	Sokol International Racetrack, Almaty

== Kuwait ==
- Kuwait Motor Town, Ali Sabah Al Salem, Ahmadi Governorate

== Laos ==
- Vientiane Racing Circuit (VRC), Ban Dông, Vientiane Province

== Lebanon ==
- Racing Park Mtein, Mtein

=== Defunct ===
- Beirut Circuit, Beirut

== Macau ==
- Guia Circuit, Macau (see also Macau Grand Prix)

== Malaysia ==
=== Permanent circuits ===
- Dato Sagor Circuit, Kampung Gajah
- Melaka International Motorsport Circuit, Ayer Keroh

†	Formula One GP Venue; MotoGP GP Venue	Sepang International Circuit, Kuala Lumpur

==== Defunct ====
†	MotoGP GP Venue	Johor Circuit, Johor Bahru

†	MotoGP GP Venue	Shah Alam Circuit

=== Temporary circuits ===
==== Defunct ====
- Johor Street Circuit, Johor Bahru
- Klang Street Circuit, Klang
- Kuala Lumpur Street Circuit, Kuala Lumpur
- Putrajaya Street Circuit, Putrajaya

== Maldives ==
- Hulhumale' Racing Track, Malé

== Mongolia ==
- Mongol63 Circuit, Ulaanbaatar

== Oman ==
- Muscat Speedway, Muscat

== Pakistan ==
- Karachi Omni Racing Track, Karachi

=== Defunct ===
- AM Speedway, Sindh

== Philippines ==
=== Permanent tracks ===
- Batangas Racing Circuit, Rosario, Batangas
- Carmona Racing Circuit, Carmona, Cavite
- Clark International Speedway, Angeles City
- Pampanga International Circuit, Porac, Pampanga
- Tarlac Circuit Hill, San Jose, Tarlac

==== Defunct ====
- Subic International Raceway, Subic Bay Freeport Zone

== Qatar ==
†	MotoGP GP Venue; Formula 1 GP Venue	Lusail International Circuit, Doha

== Russia ==
=== Permanent circuits ===
- Autodrom Moscow, Moscow
- Autodrom Saint Petersburg, Saint Petersburg
- Fort Grozny Autodrom, Grozny
- Igora Drive, Sosnovo
- Kazan Ring, Kazan
- Moscow Raceway, Moscow
- NRING Circuit, Nizhny Novgorod
- Primring, Artyom, Russia
- Red Ring, Krasnoyarsk
- Simbirskiy Sport Park, Ulyanovsk (under construction)
- Smolensk Ring, Smolensk

=== Temporary circuits ===
- Kurskaya Duga, Kursk
- Lipetskiy Climb (Lipetsky Podjom), Lipetsk
- Neva Ring (Nevskoe Ring), Saint Petersburg

†	Formula One GP Venue	Sochi Autodrom, Sochi (see also Russian Grand Prix)

- Togliatti Ring, Togliatti

== Saudi Arabia ==
=== Permanent circuits ===
- Dirab Motorsport Park, Riyadh
- Jeddah Raceway, Jeddah
- Reem International Circuit, Riyadh

=== Temporary circuits ===
†	Formula One GP Venue	Jeddah Corniche Circuit, Jeddah (see also Saudi Arabian Grand Prix)

==== Defunct ====
- Riyadh Street Circuit, Diriyah

== Singapore ==
†	Formula One GP Venue	Marina Bay Street Circuit, Downtown Core

=== Defunct ===
- Thomson Road Grand Prix circuit, Thomson Road

== South Korea ==
=== Permanent circuits ===
- Everland Speedway, Yongin, Gyeonggi-do
- Inje Speedium, Inje, Gangwon-do

†	Formula One GP Venue	Korea International Circuit, Yeongam, Jeollanam-do

- Pocheon Raceway, Gyeonggi Province
- Taebaek Racing Park, Gangwon-do

==== Defunct ====
- Ansan Circuit, Ansan, Gyeonggi
- Munmak Balborin Motor Park, Wonju, Gangwon

=== Temporary circuits ===
- Seoul Street Circuit, Seoul

==== Defunct ====
- Changwon Street Circuit, South Gyeongsang

== Sri Lanka ==
=== Permanent circuits ===
- Kanway Autodrome, Mirigama
- Katukurunda Racing Track, Kalutara
- Pannala International Racing Circuit, Pannala

=== Temporary circuits ===
==== Defunct ====
- Colombo Street Circuit, Colombo

== Taiwan ==
- Lihpao Racing Park, Taichung

=== Defunct ===
- Longtan National Speedway, Longtan
- Penbay International Circuit, Donggang

== Thailand ==
=== Permanent circuits ===
- Bira Circuit, Chonburi Province

†	MotoGP GP Venue	Chang International Circuit, Buriram Province

- Chiangrai Circuit Raceway Maelao, Mae Lao
- Kaeng Krachan Circuit, Phetchaburi Province
- Pathumthani Speedway, Pathum Thani Province
- Thailand Circuit, Nakhon Pathom Province

==== Defunct ====
- Bonanza International Circuit, Nakhon Ratchasima
- Watthana Nakhon Circuit, Watthana Nakhon

=== Temporary circuits ===
- Bangsaen Street Circuit, Chonburi
- Songkhla Street Circuit, Songkhla

==== Defunct ====
- Bangkok Street Circuit, Bangkok
- Korat Circuit, Nakhon Ratchasima
- Prachuap Street Circuit, Prachuap Khiri Khan

== Turkey ==
=== Permanent circuits ===
- Autodrom Tuzla, Tuzla, Istanbul

†	Formula One GP Venue; MotoGP GP Venue	Istanbul Park, Tuzla, Istanbul

- İzmit Körfez Circuit, Körfez
- Ülkü Park, İzmir

=== Temporary circuits ===
==== Defunct ====
- Hezarfen Airfield, Çatalca

== United Arab Emirates ==
=== Permanent circuits ===
- Dubai Autodrome, Dubai

†	Formula One GP Venue	Yas Marina Circuit, Abu Dhabi (see also Abu Dhabi Grand Prix)

=== Temporary circuits ===
==== Defunct ====
- Dubai Motor Grand Prix Circuit, Dubai

== Vietnam ==
- Dai Nam Race Track, Thủ Dầu Một
- Happy Land International Circuit, Long An

=== Defunct ===
- Hanoi Street Circuit, Hanoi

== Other articles ==
- List of motor racing tracks
- List of motor racing tracks in Africa
