= Rhodesian Grand Prix =

Open-wheel motor race (1960s–1970s)

- Donnybrook Raceway (1974, 1976-1977)
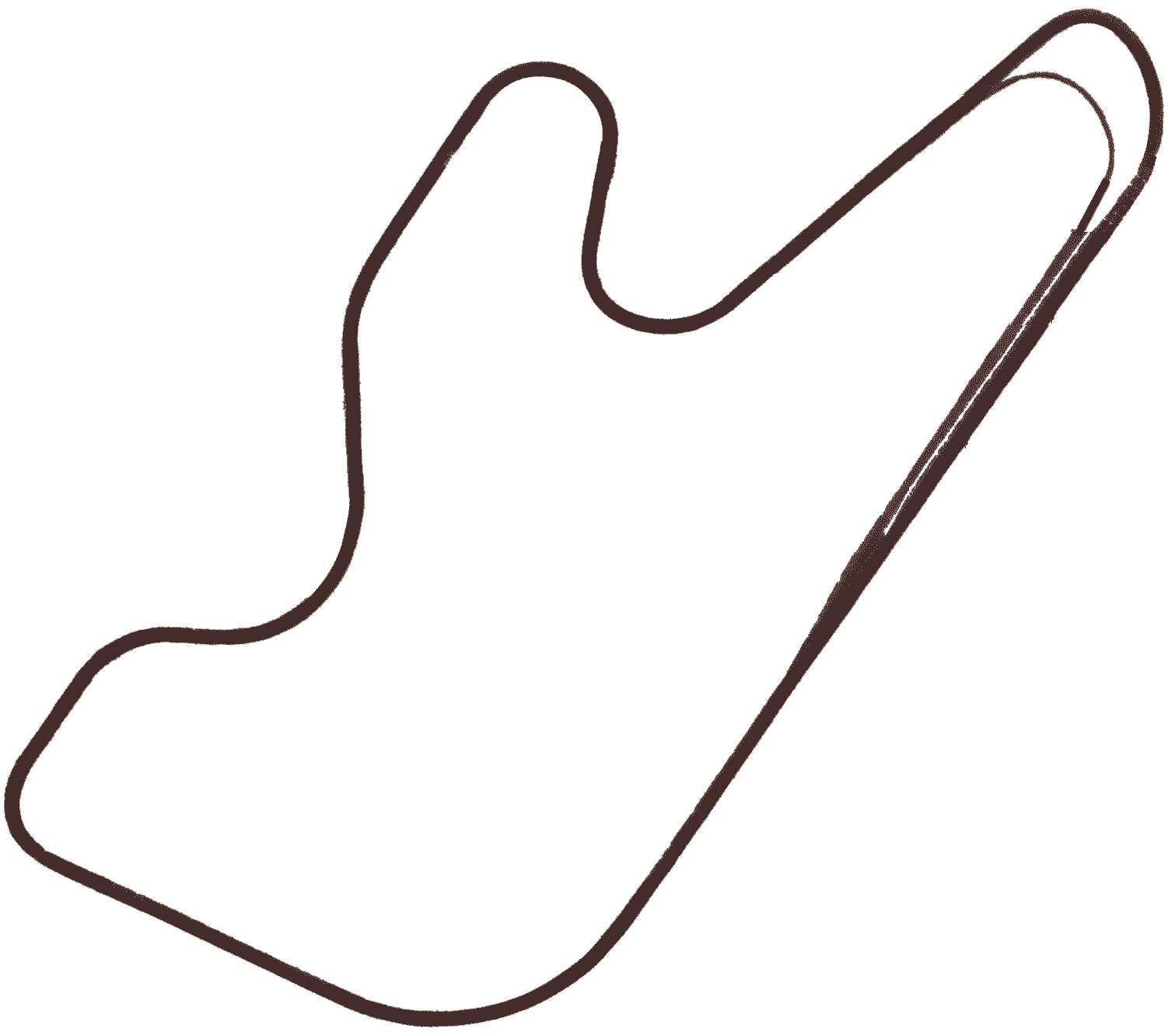

Race information
- Number of times held: 17
- First held: 1960
- Last held: 1977
- Most wins (drivers): (Rhodesia) John Love (6)
- Most wins (constructors): (United Kingdom) Lotus (5)
- Laps: 44

Last race (1977)

Pole position
- (South Africa) John Gibb; March-Ford; 1:03.9

Podium
- 1. (South Africa) Tony Martin; Chevron-Ford; 2. (South Africa) Dave Charlton; March-Ford; 3. (South Africa) Len Booysen; March-Ford

Fastest lap

The Rhodesian Grand Prix was an open-wheel motor race held in the 1960s and 70s, most often as a round of the South African Formula One Championship. During that time it played host to wide variety of racing cars, Formula One, Formula 5000, Formula Two, Formula Atlantic as well as locally created racing cars.

Originally held on an airfield circuit in Belvedere, Salisbury, the race moved to another airfield circuit, the James McNeillie Circuit in Bulawayo for ten years. In 1971 the race moved to the purpose-built facility, the Breedon Everard Raceway in Bulawayo before moving to its final home at Donnybrook Raceway in Harare.

Rhodesian driver John Love was the most accomplished, winning the race six times between 1963 and 1972.

== Winners of the Rhodesian Grand Prix ==
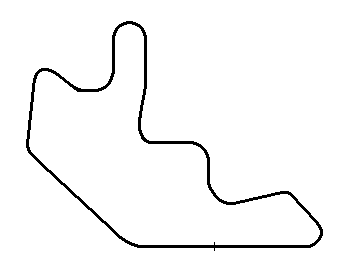
The original layout of the Breedon Everard Raceway used between 1971 and 1973

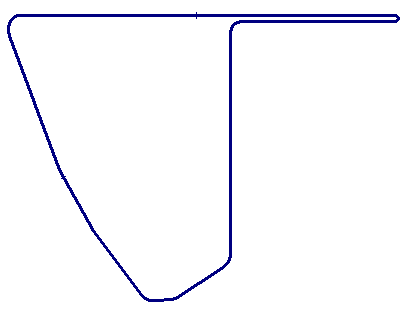
The layout of the James McNeillie Circuit used between 1961 and 1970

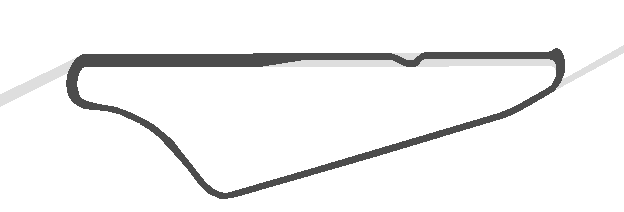
The layout of the Belvedere Airfield used in 1960

Year	Driver	Constructor	Location	Formula	Report
1960	(South Africa) Syd van der Vyver	Cooper-Alfa Romeo	Belvedere Airport	Formula Libre	Report
1961	(South Africa) Ernest Pieterse	Heron-Alfa Romeo	James McNeillie Circuit	Formula One	Report
1962	(Federation of Rhodesia and Nyasaland) Gary Hocking	Lotus-Climax	James McNeillie Circuit	Formula One	Report
1963	(Federation of Rhodesia and Nyasaland) John Love	Cooper-Climax	James McNeillie Circuit	Formula One	Report
1964	(Australia) Paul Hawkins	Brabham-Ford	James McNeillie Circuit	Formula One	Report
1965	(Rhodesia) John Love	Cooper-Climax	James McNeillie Circuit	Formula One	Report
1966	(United Kingdom) Bob Anderson	Brabham-Climax	James McNeillie Circuit	Formula One	Report
1967	(Rhodesia) John Love	Brabham-Repco	James McNeillie Circuit	Formula One	Report
1968	(Rhodesia) John Love	Lotus-Ford	James McNeillie Circuit	Formula One	Report
1969	(South Africa) Dave Charlton	Lola-Chevrolet	James McNeillie Circuit	South African Formula One	Report
1970	(South Africa) Dave Charlton	Lotus-Ford	James McNeillie Circuit	South African Formula One	Report
1971	(Rhodesia) John Love	March-Ford	Breedon Everard Raceway	South African Formula One	Report
1972	(Rhodesia) John Love	Brabham-Ford	Breedon Everard Raceway	South African Formula One	Report
1973	(South Africa) Dave Charlton	Lotus-Ford	Breedon Everard Raceway	South African Formula One	Report
1974	(South Africa) Ian Scheckter	Lotus-Ford	Donnybrook Raceway	South African Formula One	Report
1975	Not held				
1976	(South Africa) Roy Klomfass	Ralt-Ford	Donnybrook Raceway	Formula Atlantic	Report
1977	(South Africa) Tony Martin	Chevron-Ford	Donnybrook Raceway	Formula Atlantic	Report
