= Donnybrook Raceway =

Motor racing circuit in Harare, Zimbabwe

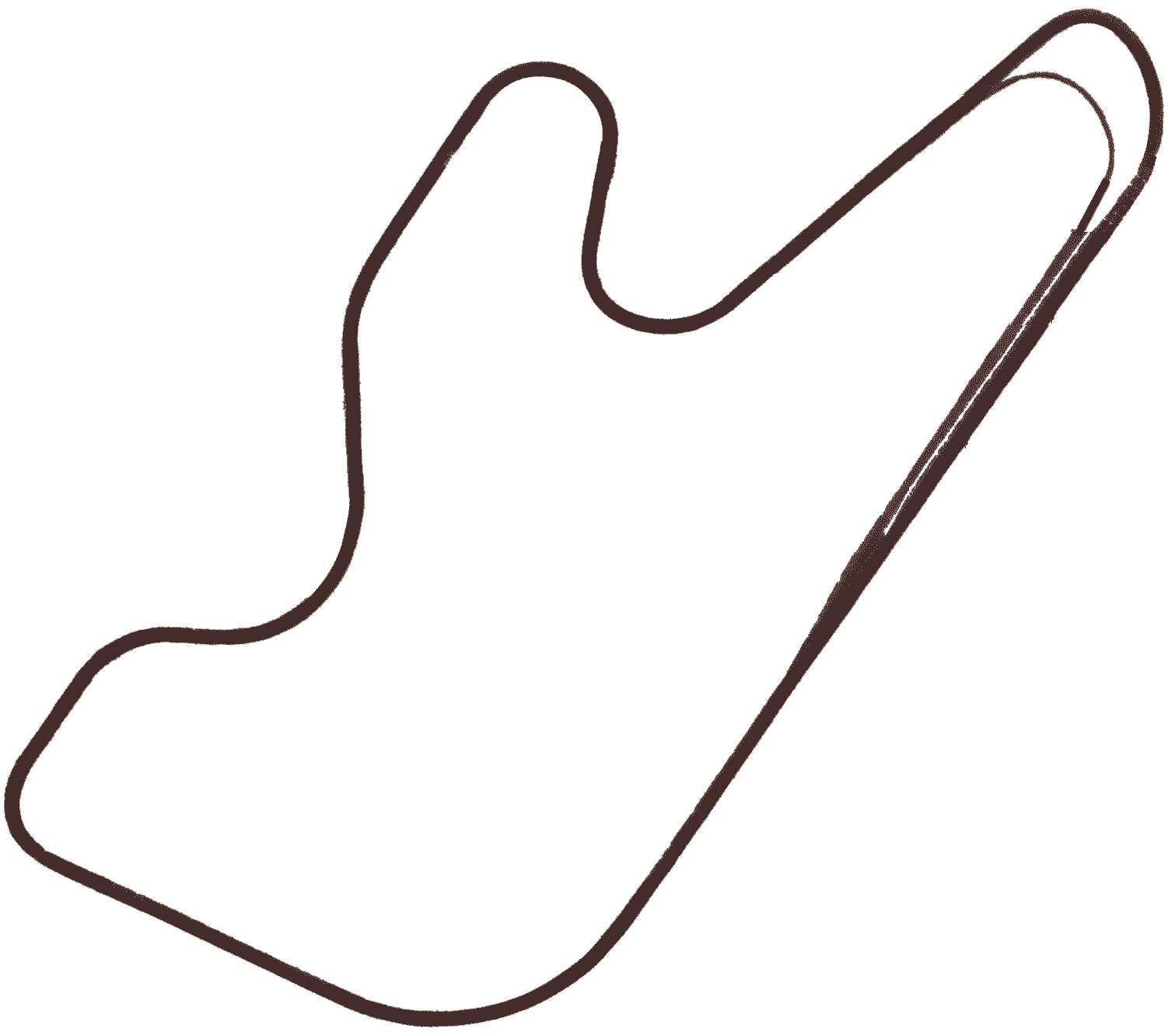
- Full Circuit (1974–present)
- Location: Harare, Zimbabwe
- Coordinates: 17°49′33.3″S 31°10′57.5″E
- Broke ground: 1972
- Opened: April 1974; 51 years ago
- Major events: Former: South African Formula One Championship Rhodesian Grand Prix (1974); South African Formula Atlantic Championship (1976–1977)

Full Circuit (1974–present)
- Length: 2.750 km (1.709 miles)
- Turns: 8
- Race lap record: 1:00.900 ( (South Africa) Ian Scheckter, Lotus 72E, 1974, F1)

The Donnybrook Raceway was a 2.750 km (1.709 mi) motor racing circuit in Harare. The circuit held the Rhodesian Grand Prix in 1974 and 1976-77, as well as the successor Zimbabwean Grand Prix in the 1980s. The circuit was opened in April 1974. The circuit is still active, and it was resurfaced in 2016.
