= Roy Hesketh Circuit =

Racing circuit in Pietermaritzburg, South Africa

- Full Circuit (1962–1981)
- Location: Pietermaritzburg, KwaZulu-Natal
- Coordinates: 29°37′23″S 30°25′32″E
- Opened: 26 December 1953; 72 years ago
- Closed: November 1981; 44 years ago
- Major events: South African Formula Atlantic Championship (1976–1979); South African Formula One Championship (1961–1975); South African Springbok Championship Series (1966–1972)

Full Circuit (1962–1981)
- Length: 2.902 km (1.803 mi)
- Turns: 7
- Race lap record: 1:00.300 ( (Rhodesia) John Love, Chevron B25, 1973, F2)

Original Circuit (1953–1961)
- Length: 2.575 km (1.600 mi)
- Turns: 7

The Roy Hesketh Circuit was a racing circuit located on the outskirts of Pietermaritzburg in KwaZulu-Natal. It was named after South African racing driver Roy Hesketh, who died in the Second World War. Doug Aldridge, Colin Dove, Ossie Fisher, George Finch and George Shrives got together as a Consortium from Pietermaritzburg in the early nineteen fifties to first build and then maintain and improve the circuit.

The circuit was opened in December 1953, and extended in 1962.

During its period of operation (1953–1981) it hosted rounds of the South African National Drivers Championship, and national Formula Atlantic races. The circuit also hosted the Easter races - a festival of racing over three days. Mike Hailwood, Giacomo Agostini, Barry Sheene, Kork Ballington, Jim Redman, Paddy Driver, Alan North, Mike Grant, Rod Gray and Syd Stacy were regular competitors at the circuit as were John Love, Jackie Pretorius, Sam Tingle, Jody Scheckter and brother Ian Scheckter.

In 1973 the South African government banned all motorsport due to the world oil crisis, the circuit went into decline and finally closed in November 1981 after only 28 years.

== The Stock Car Dust Bowl ==
Stock Car racing started at the Dust Bowl Circuit in the mid 60s and was very successful, it created a new style of racing in the area bringing stock car drivers from as far afield as Dundee and Durban. Miles Crerar founded the Pietermarizburg Stockcar and Speedway Supporters Club. Most drivers were local, such as Clive and Nigel Owen, Alyn Woodley, Allan Hoy, Colin Clarke, Llew Futter, Gareth Bailey, Margaret Tyrer, Witty Boast, Bunny Dique, Lez Bromfield and Chris Currey.

The sport went into decline in the late 70s and the circuit closed for good in 1981.

== Dirt Bike Speedway ==
Dave Hiron an ex UK speedway rider and hard working secretary for stock car and motorcycle dirt racing arranged motorcycle racing on the stock car track. Dave Hiron was seriously injured when accidentally run down by a rider while officiating, after a long recovery period worked tirelessly behind the scenes to make dirt bikes a success in the 1970s. Riders of that time include: S.A. champion, Les Smith, Eddie English, Arthur Arpin and the Bergstrom brothers.

== Karting ==
Blackie Blackman, John White, Neville Flint and Alf Ford and many other raced at the Karting track built on the inside of the main racing circuit. Arthur Eggar won the Natal Championship in 1976 and awarded the Natal Colours.

== Post Closure ==
Motor racing in Pietermaritzburg gradually decreased after the closing of the track in 1981. The track is now being used for advanced driver training and track days.

In January 2004 the circuit was sold to the Roy Hesketh Motor Racing Foundation for R 3,250,000. Strict development conditions were attached to the sale.

In 2009 Bunker Racing started at the circuit. 2010 the circuit was closed to all motor racing after several civil protests against the noise. In 2013 the property was put up for sale for R 1.5 million due to the Roy Hesketh Motor Racing Foundation defaulting on the previous sale conditions.

== Pre Roy Hesketh Circuit ==
The 3.400 mi (5.472 km) Alexandra Park Street Circuit was established in 1948 on streets within the town of Pietermaritzburg. Races were held until 1953 when the Roy Hesketh Circuit was built.

== Lap records ==
The fastest official race lap records at the Roy Hesketh Circuit are listed as:

Category	Time	Driver	Vehicle	Event
Full Circuit (1953–1981): 2.902 km (1.803 mi)
Formula Two	1:00.300	John Love	Chevron B25	1973 Mercury 100
Formula One	1:01.400	Dave Charlton	McLaren M23	1974 Mercury 100

== See also ==
- Alexandra Park Street Circuit
