= James McNeillie Circuit =

Motor racing circuit in Bulawayo, Zimbabwe

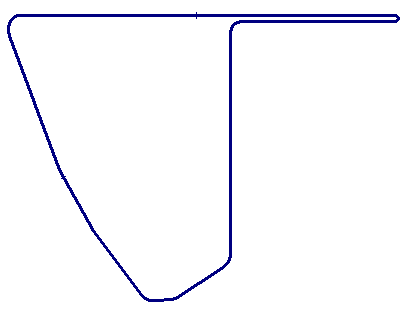
- Airfield Circuit (1961–1971)
- Location: Kumalo, Bulawayo, Zimbabwe
- Coordinates: 20°08′13″S 28°36′31″E
- Broke ground: 1959
- Opened: July 1961; 64 years ago
- Closed: December 1971; 54 years ago
- Major events: Former: South African Formula One Championship Rhodesian Grand Prix (1961–1970); South African Springbok Championship Series (1969–1971)

Airfield Circuit (1961–1971)
- Length: 3.444 km (2.140 mi)
- Turns: 8
- Race lap record: 1:18.000 ( (Rhodesia) John Love, Brabham BT20, 1967, F1)

The James McNeillie Circuit was a 3.444 km (2.140 mi) motor racing circuit in Kumalo, Bulawayo, Zimbabwe.

== History ==
The circuit was built from 1959 to 1961 in Kumalo Airfield, 3 km (1.9 mi) northeast of Bulawayo and was named after the politician, James McNeillie. The circuit held the Rhodesian Grand Prix in 1961–1970, and South African Springbok Championship Series in 1969–1971. As there was no dedicated covered seating, sunburns were commonly experienced among its spectators. During the mid-1960s, the Rhodesian Corps of Signals at Brady Barracks, which was located next to the racetrack, utilized it to practise Morse code with Land Rovers. Following Rhodesia's Unilateral Declaration of Independence in November 1965, the country faced fuel shortages caused by international sanctions. This led to petrol rationing, and by 1966, the racetrack was in poor condition due to overgrowth. Subsequently, a number of events were likely cancelled. After the opening of nearby Breedon Everard Raceway in 1970, racing events were transferred to the new circuit, and James McNeillie Circuit was closed in 1971.

== Lap records ==
The fastest official race lap records at the James McNeillie Circuit are listed as:

Category	Time	Driver	Vehicle	Event
Airfield Circuit (1961–1971): 3.444 km (2.140 mi)
Formula One	1:18.000	John Love	Brabham BT20	1967 Rhodesian Grand Prix
Formula Two	1:26.500	Paul Hawkins	Brabham BT10	1964 Rhodesian Grand Prix
Group 6	1:28.500	Dave Charlton	Chevron B19	1971 Embassy 3 Hours

== See also ==
- Breedon Everard Raceway
