= Killarney Motor Racing Complex =

Motorsport complex in Table View, Cape Town, South Africa

Killarney International Raceway
- Full Circuit (1960–present)
- Location: Cape Town, South Africa
- Coordinates: 33°49′24″S 18°31′40″E
- Operator: Western Province Motor Club
- Opened: 1951
- Architect: Edgar Hoal
- Major events: Former: FIA World Rallycross Championship; World RX of South Africa (2017–2019, 2023); Cape Grand Prix (1960–1962, 1965, 1967–1968)

Full Circuit (1960–present)
- Length: 3.267 km (2.030 mi)
- Turns: 5
- Race lap record: 1:08.100 ( (South Africa) Ian Scheckter, Lotus 72, 1974, F1)

World RX Circuit (2017–2019, 2023)
- Length: 1.060 km (0.659 mi)
- Turns: 7

Full Circuit (1954–1960)
- Length: 2.687 km (1.670 mi)
- Turns: 9

Full Circuit (1952–1954)
- Length: 1.650 km (1.025 mi)
- Turns: 5

Original Circuit (1951)
- Length: 1.000 km (0.621 mi)
- Turns: 4

Killarney International Raceway is a motorsport complex in Table View, Cape Town, South Africa. It first saw action in 1947.

== History ==
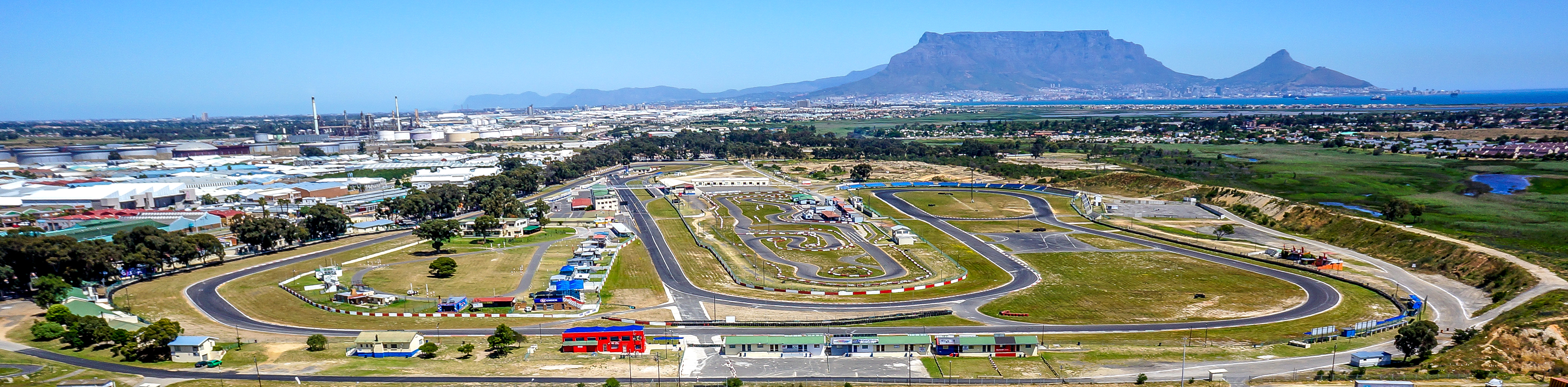
An aerial view of the Killarney Race Track with Table Mountain visible in the distance

In 1959/60 the track was upgraded and rebuilt to conform to the required FIA standard for the 1500 cc Formula One cars of the time. The design was entrusted to Edgar Hoal, a leading racing driver and roads engineer, who also supervised its construction.

The Western Cape then had its first taste of international Formula One racing when the non-championship Cape Grand Prix was held at Killarney on 17 December 1960, and was won by Stirling Moss in a Porsche. Since then the complex has grown to include every facet of circuit motorsport. So much so that Killarney currently hosts all forms of main circuit racing, as well as motocross, karting, super motards, stock car, drag racing and European Truck Racing as a one-off event.

World RX layout of Killarney Motor Racing Complex

The circuit hosted the first FIA World Championship race in South Africa since the 1990s with the inaugural World RX of South Africa was held in 2017 for the FIA World Rallycross Championship.

== Track features ==
The main track has the unusual feature of having two pit lanes on the home stretch. The racing complex also has a drag racing strip and a go-kart track.

Additionally, turn 9 can be turned into a proper chicane for the purposes of motorcycle races.

For the World RX of South Africa, the northwestern portion of the circuit was used, with an extra dirt road added to its infield.

== Lap records ==
As of March 2023, the fastest official race lap records at the Killarney Motor Racing Complex are listed as:

Full Circuit (1960–present): 3.267 km (2.030 mi)
Category	Time	Driver	Vehicle	Event
Formula One	1:08.100	Ian Scheckter	Lotus 72	1974 False Bay 100
Group 6	1:13.600	John Watson	Chevron B26	1973 Cape Town 3 Hours
GTC	1:15.426	Saood Wariawa	Toyota Corolla (E210)	2022 2nd Killarney Global Touring Car Championship round
SupaCup	1:18.326	Bradley Liebenberg	Volkswagen Polo VI	2023 1st Killarney Global Touring Car Championship round
