= Aichi University of Technology Automotive Junior College =

Higher education institution in Aichi Prefecture, Japan

- 愛知工科大学自動車短期大学
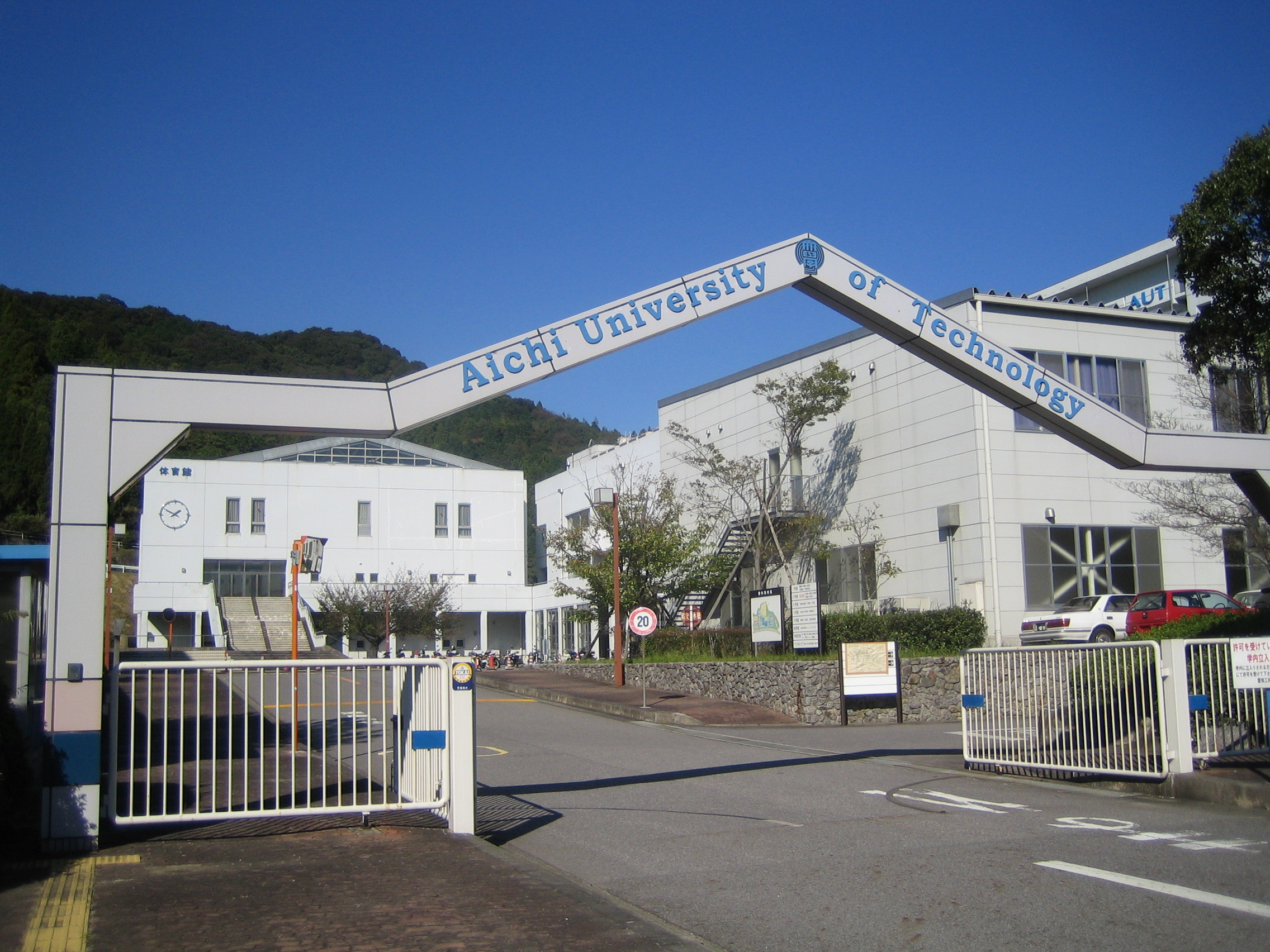
- Type: Private
- Established: 1987
- Location: Gamagōri, Aichi, Japan
- Website: http://www.aut.ac.jp/auto/autotop.htm

Aichi University of Technology Automotive Junior College (愛知工科大学自動車短期大学, Aichi Kōka Daigaku Jidōsha Tanki Daigaku) is a private junior college in Gamagōri, Aichi, Japan. It was established in 1987 as Aichi College of Technology (愛知技術短期大学, Aichi Gijutsu Tanki Daigaku). It has been attached to Aichi University of Technology since 2000.

== Departments ==
- Department of automotive studies

== See also ==
- List of junior colleges in Japan
