= Phakisa Freeway =

Motor racing circuit in South Africa

- Grand Prix Circuit (1999–present)

- Speedway (1999–present)
- Location: Odendaalsrus, Free State, South Africa
- Coordinates: 27°54′18″S 26°42′43.2″E
- Capacity: 60,000
- Broke ground: September 1998; 27 years ago
- Opened: 1970; Re-opened: May 1999; 26 years ago
- Closed: 1997
- Former names: Goldfields Raceway (1970–1997)
- Major events: Former: Grand Prix motorcycle racing South African motorcycle Grand Prix (1999–2004); Free State 500 (2010); South African Formula One Championship (1971–1975); South African Springbok Championship Series (1971–1972)
- Website: www.phakisa.co.za

Grand Prix Circuit (1999–present)
- Length: 4.242 km (2.636 mi)
- Turns: 14
- Race lap record: 1:33.208 ( (Italy) Max Biaggi, Honda RC211V, 2004, MotoGP)

Speedway (1999–present)
- Length: 2.414 km (1.500 mi)
- Turns: 4
- Banking: 3 – 12º

Short Circuit (1999–present)
- Length: 3.199 km (1.988 mi)
- Turns: 10

Goldfields Raceway (1970–1997)
- Length: 4.168 km (2.590 mi)
- Turns: 10
- Race lap record: 1:23.000 ( (South Africa) Dave Charlton, McLaren M23, 1975, F1)

Phakisa Freeway is a motor racing circuit located between Welkom and Odendaalsrus, South Africa. It is one of the few oval speedways outside of the United States and the only one in Africa.

== History ==
Phakisa Freeway was built on the same site as the former Goldfields Raceway, which closed in 1997.

The current track opened in 1999. It consists of a 4.242 km (2.636 mi) road course and a 2.414-kilometre (1.500 mi) oval course. The road course uses the oval's pit lane as its backstraight and crosses the oval's backstretch on two times.

The oval track is similar to the Las Vegas Motor Speedway in its 1997 configuration: 12 degree banking in the turns, nine degrees on the tri-oval and three degrees on the back stretch. It was built to attract American oval racing like NASCAR or IndyCar.

== Events ==
From 1999 to 2004, the venue hosted the South African motorcycle Grand Prix of the MotoGP championship.

The Superbike World Championship announced their intention to run at Phakisa Freeway from 2014 onwards. Due to homologation issues the series never raced at the circuit.

Since 2014, Phakisa Freeway has only hosted national events.

The only event held on the oval was the Free State 500 in 2010. The American Speed Association imported NASCAR gen 4 stock cars to South Africa for the race. Various drivers from South Africa, Europe and the US competed – including former NASCAR driver Geoff Bodine.

== Lap records ==
As of April 2004, the fastest official race lap records at the Phakisa Freeway are listed as:

Category	Time	Driver	Vehicle	Event
Phakisa Freeway Grand Prix Circuit (1999–present): 4.242 km (2.636 mi)
MotoGP	1:33.208	Max Biaggi	Honda RC211V	2004 South African motorcycle Grand Prix
500cc	1:35.508	Valentino Rossi	Honda NSR500	2001 South African motorcycle Grand Prix
250cc	1:35.593	Sebastián Porto	Aprilia RSV 250	2004 South African motorcycle Grand Prix
125cc	1:40.711	Roberto Locatelli	Aprilia RS125R	2004 South African motorcycle Grand Prix
Goldfields Raceway (1970–1997): 4.168 km (2.590 mi)
Formula One	1:23.000	Dave Charlton	McLaren M23	1975 Welkom 100
Group 6	1:30.200	John Watson	Chevron B19	1971 Die Volksblad 3 Hours
Group 5	1:28.000	Gerry Birrell	Chevron B23	1972 Goldfields 3 Hours

== See also ==
- Calder Park Raceway
- EuroSpeedway Lausitz
- Rockingham Motor Speedway
- Twin Ring Motegi
