= Roy Hesketh =

South African racing driver

- Born: January 1, 1915; Pietermaritzburg
- Died: 19 September, 1944
- Occupations: Engineer, Racing driver, Racing automobile driver

Lieutenant Roy O. Hesketh (1915 in Pietermaritzburg, South Africa – 19 September 1944 above Great Bitter Lake, Egypt) was a South African racing driver and South African Air Force pilot.

Lieutenant Roy Hesketh died in Egypt in an aircraft collision in the Second World War near Al Alamein while acting as a flying instructor. The Roy Hesketh Circuit in Pietermaritzburg was named after him.

He was buried at the Fayid War Cemetery in Fayid, Egypt.
