= 2004 South African motorcycle Grand Prix =

(South Africa) 2004 South African Grand Prix
Race details
- Race 1 of 16 races in the 2004 Grand Prix motorcycle racing season
- Date: 18 April 2004
- Official name: betandwin.com Africa's Grand Prix
- Location: Phakisa Freeway
- Course: Permanent racing facility; 4.242 km (2.636 mi)

MotoGP
Pole position
- Rider: (Italy) Valentino Rossi
- Time: 1:32.647
Fastest lap
- Rider: (Italy) Max Biaggi
- Time: 1:33.208 on lap 28
Podium
- First: (Italy) Valentino Rossi
- Second: (Italy) Max Biaggi
- Third: (Spain) Sete Gibernau

250cc
Pole position
- Rider: (France) Randy de Puniet
- Time: 1:35.300
Fastest lap
- Rider: (Argentina) Sebastián Porto
- Time: 1:35.593 on lap 5
Podium
- First: (Spain) Daniel Pedrosa
- Second: (France) Randy de Puniet
- Third: (Argentina) Sebastián Porto

125cc
Pole position
- Rider: (Italy) Andrea Dovizioso
- Time: 1:40.942
Fastest lap
- Rider: (Italy) Roberto Locatelli
- Time: 1:40.711 on lap 21
Podium
- First: (Italy) Andrea Dovizioso
- Second: (Italy) Roberto Locatelli
- Third: (Australia) Casey Stoner

The 2004 South African motorcycle Grand Prix was the first round of the 2004 MotoGP Championship. It took place on the weekend of 16–18 April 2004 at the Phakisa Freeway. This was the last South African MotoGP round at Phakisa, because the race was not contracted for 2005 and beyond.

== MotoGP classification ==
Pos.	No.	Rider	Team	Manufacturer	Laps	Time/Retired	Grid	Points
1	46	(Italy) Valentino Rossi	Gauloises Fortuna Yamaha	Yamaha	28	43:50.218	1	25
2	3	(Italy) Max Biaggi	Camel Honda	Honda	28	+0.210	3	20
3	15	(Spain) Sete Gibernau	Telefónica Movistar Honda MotoGP	Honda	28	+7.255	2	16
4	4	(Brazil) Alex Barros	Repsol Honda Team	Honda	28	+18.667	8	13
5	69	(United States) Nicky Hayden	Repsol Honda Team	Honda	28	+24.094	4	11
6	65	(Italy) Loris Capirossi	Ducati Marlboro Team	Ducati	28	+24.375	9	10
7	45	(United States) Colin Edwards	Telefónica Movistar Honda MotoGP	Honda	28	+28.855	5	9
8	6	(Japan) Makoto Tamada	Camel Honda	Honda	28	+36.535	12	8
9	17	(Japan) Norifumi Abe	Fortuna Gauloises Tech 3	Yamaha	28	+36.643	18	7
10	7	(Spain) Carlos Checa	Gauloises Fortuna Yamaha	Yamaha	28	+39.284	14	6
11	33	(Italy) Marco Melandri	Fortuna Gauloises Tech 3	Yamaha	28	+43.806	7	5
12	56	(Japan) Shinya Nakano	Kawasaki Racing Team	Kawasaki	28	+43.920	6	4
13	21	(United States) John Hopkins	Team Suzuki MotoGP	Suzuki	28	+56.028	11	3
14	12	(Australia) Troy Bayliss	Ducati Marlboro Team	Ducati	28	+56.558	21	2
15	67	(United Kingdom) Shane Byrne	MS Aprilia Racing	Aprilia	28	+1:13.831	19	1
16	99	(United Kingdom) Jeremy McWilliams	MS Aprilia Racing	Aprilia	28	+1:22.206	17	
17	9	(Japan) Nobuatsu Aoki	Proton Team KR	Proton KR	28	+1:26.933	20	
18	84	(Italy) Michel Fabrizio	WCM	Harris WCM	25	+3 laps	22	
Ret	66	(Germany) Alex Hofmann	Kawasaki Racing Team	Kawasaki	15	Accident	13	
Ret	50	(United Kingdom) Neil Hodgson	D'Antin MotoGP	Ducati	15	Retirement	15	
Ret	10	(United States) Kenny Roberts Jr.	Team Suzuki MotoGP	Suzuki	6	Retirement	10	
Ret	11	(Spain) Rubén Xaus	D'Antin MotoGP	Ducati	4	Retirement	16	
WD	80	(United States) Kurtis Roberts	Proton Team KR	Proton KR		Withdrew		

== 250 cc classification ==
Pos.	No.	Rider	Manufacturer	Laps	Time/Retired	Grid	Points
1	26	(Spain) Daniel Pedrosa	Honda	26	42:04.690	4	25
2	7	(France) Randy de Puniet	Aprilia	26	+0.536	1	20
3	19	(Argentina) Sebastián Porto	Aprilia	26	+5.859	2	16
4	54	(San Marino) Manuel Poggiali	Aprilia	26	+24.561	3	13
5	51	(San Marino) Alex de Angelis	Aprilia	26	+30.018	5	11
6	6	(Spain) Alex Debón	Honda	26	+30.653	15	10
7	10	(Spain) Fonsi Nieto	Aprilia	26	+31.458	6	9
8	24	(Spain) Toni Elías	Honda	26	+31.872	11	8
9	2	(Italy) Roberto Rolfo	Honda	26	+31.940	7	7
10	21	(Italy) Franco Battaini	Aprilia	26	+35.643	10	6
11	73	(Japan) Hiroshi Aoyama	Honda	26	+36.418	9	5
12	33	(Spain) Héctor Faubel	Aprilia	26	+36.864	12	4
13	12	(France) Arnaud Vincent	Aprilia	26	+39.105	24	3
14	28	(Germany) Dirk Heidolf	Aprilia	26	+43.027	22	2
15	50	(France) Sylvain Guintoli	Aprilia	26	+51.493	19	1
16	14	(Australia) Anthony West	Aprilia	26	+51.699	20	
17	11	(Spain) Joan Olivé	Aprilia	26	+52.883	18	
18	8	(Japan) Naoki Matsudo	Yamaha	26	+59.900	14	
19	9	(France) Hugo Marchand	Aprilia	26	+1:02.819	16	
20	36	(France) Erwan Nigon	Yamaha	26	+1:14.844	23	
21	96	(Czech Republic) Jakub Smrž	Honda	26	+1:15.026	21	
22	44	(Japan) Taro Sekiguchi	Yamaha	26	+1:19.230	28	
23	16	(Sweden) Johan Stigefelt	Aprilia	26	+1:21.627	26	
24	40	(Italy) Max Sabbatani	Yamaha	26	+1:28.990	29	
25	77	(France) Grégory Lefort	Aprilia	26	+1:29.832	27	
Ret	15	(Germany) Christian Gemmel	Honda	24	Retirement	25	
Ret	25	(Italy) Alex Baldolini	Aprilia	0	Accident	17	
Ret	34	(France) Eric Bataille	Honda	0	Accident	8	
Ret	57	(United Kingdom) Chaz Davies	Aprilia	0	Accident	13	

== 125 cc classification ==
Pos.	No.	Rider	Manufacturer	Laps	Time/Retired	Grid	Points
1	34	(Italy) Andrea Dovizioso	Honda	24	40:34.318	1	25
2	15	(Italy) Roberto Locatelli	Aprilia	24	+0.071	2	20
3	27	(Australia) Casey Stoner	KTM	24	+2.203	5	16
4	22	(Spain) Pablo Nieto	Aprilia	24	+2.416	6	13
5	63	(France) Mike Di Meglio	Aprilia	24	+12.312	4	11
6	23	(Italy) Gino Borsoi	Aprilia	24	+13.270	12	10
7	6	(Italy) Mirko Giansanti	Aprilia	24	+14.457	3	9
8	21	(Germany) Steve Jenkner	Aprilia	24	+15.046	18	8
9	19	(Spain) Álvaro Bautista	Aprilia	24	+24.835	8	7
10	3	(Spain) Héctor Barberá	Aprilia	24	+25.266	11	6
11	10	(Spain) Julián Simón	Honda	24	+29.356	10	5
12	36	(Finland) Mika Kallio	KTM	24	+33.134	15	4
13	54	(Italy) Mattia Pasini	Aprilia	24	+33.237	20	3
14	24	(Italy) Simone Corsi	Honda	24	+33.682	21	2
15	41	(Japan) Youichi Ui	Aprilia	24	+36.977	9	1
16	48	(Spain) Jorge Lorenzo	Derbi	24	+43.650	13	
17	7	(Italy) Stefano Perugini	Gilera	24	+45.230	19	
18	69	(Denmark) Robbin Harms	Honda	24	+45.389	22	
19	26	(Germany) Dario Giuseppetti	Honda	24	+45.590	16	
20	52	(Czech Republic) Lukáš Pešek	Honda	24	+45.715	27	
21	32	(Italy) Fabrizio Lai	Gilera	24	+45.961	17	
22	25	(Hungary) Imre Tóth	Aprilia	24	+46.129	25	
23	33	(Spain) Sergio Gadea	Aprilia	24	+1:04.990	24	
24	66	(Finland) Vesa Kallio	Aprilia	24	+1:05.784	26	
25	11	(Italy) Mattia Angeloni	Honda	24	+1:23.541	32	
26	8	(Italy) Manuel Manna	Malaguti	24	+1:23.753	31	
27	28	(Spain) Jordi Carchano	Aprilia	24	+1:24.960	33	
Ret	12	(Switzerland) Thomas Lüthi	Honda	17	Accident	23	
Ret	58	(Italy) Marco Simoncelli	Aprilia	16	Accident	7	
Ret	50	(Italy) Andrea Ballerini	Aprilia	13	Retirement	29	
Ret	47	(Spain) Ángel Rodríguez	Derbi	7	Retirement	28	
Ret	42	(Italy) Gioele Pellino	Aprilia	7	Retirement	30	
Ret	16	(Netherlands) Raymond Schouten	Honda	4	Retirement	34	
Ret	14	(Hungary) Gábor Talmácsi	Malaguti	3	Retirement	14	

== Championship standings after the race (MotoGP) ==
Below are the standings for the top five riders and constructors after round one has concluded.

Riders' Championship standings

Pos.	Rider	Points
1	(Italy) Valentino Rossi	25
2	(Italy) Max Biaggi	20
3	(Spain) Sete Gibernau	16
4	(Brazil) Alex Barros	13
5	(United States) Nicky Hayden	11

Constructors' Championship standings

Pos.	Constructor	Points
1	(Japan) Yamaha	25
2	(Japan) Honda	20
3	(Italy) Ducati	10
4	(Japan) Kawasaki	4
5	(Japan) Suzuki	3

- Note: Only the top five positions are included for both sets of standings.

Previous race: 2003 Valencian Grand Prix	FIM Grand Prix World Championship; 2004 season	Next race: 2004 Spanish Grand Prix
Previous race: 2003 South African Grand Prix	South African motorcycle Grand Prix	Next race: None
