= Breedon Everard Raceway =

Motor racing circuit in Bulawayo, Zimbabwe

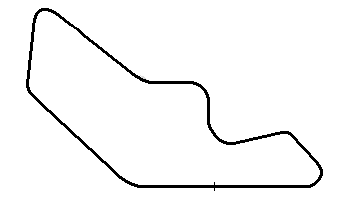
- Short Circuit (1975–present)

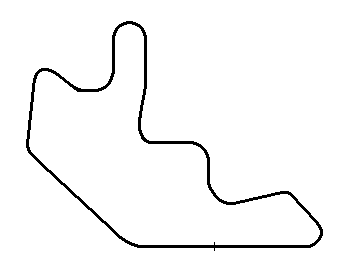
- Original Circuit (1969–1974)
- Location: Bulawayo, Zimbabwe
- Coordinates: 20°06′31″S 28°34′13″E
- Opened: November 1969; 56 years ago
- Major events: Current: Bulawayo 3 Hours; Former: South African Formula One Championship Rhodesian Grand Prix (1971–1973)

Short Circuit (1975–present)
- Length: 3.478 km (2.161 mi)
- Turns: 8

Original Circuit (1969–1974)
- Length: 4.079 km (2.535 mi)
- Turns: 10
- Race lap record: 1:21.400 ( (Rhodesia) John Love, Chevron B25, 1973, F2)

The Breedon Everard Raceway (also known as Bulawayo Motorsport Park) is a motor racing circuit in Bulawayo, Zimbabwe. The circuit was built in 1969 when Zimbabwe was known as Rhodesia. This circuit was built and completed in December 1969 and was originally 4.081 km (2.536 mi) long, but was shortened to 3.478 km (2.161 mi) in 1975. The circuit hosted the Rhodesian Grand Prix on 3 occasions and hosts the Bulawayo 3 Hours sportscar race.

== Lap records ==
The fastest official race lap records at the Breedon Everard Raceway are listed as:

Category	Time	Driver	Vehicle	Event
Original Circuit (1969–1974): 4.081 km (2.536 mi)
Formula Two	1:21.400	John Love	Chevron B25	1973 Bulawayo 100
Formula One	1:24.600	Dave Charlton	Lotus 72D	1972 Rhodesian Grand Prix

== See also ==
- James McNeillie Circuit
