= Spa Nishiura Motor Park =

Race complex near Gamagōri, Aichi, Japan

SNMP
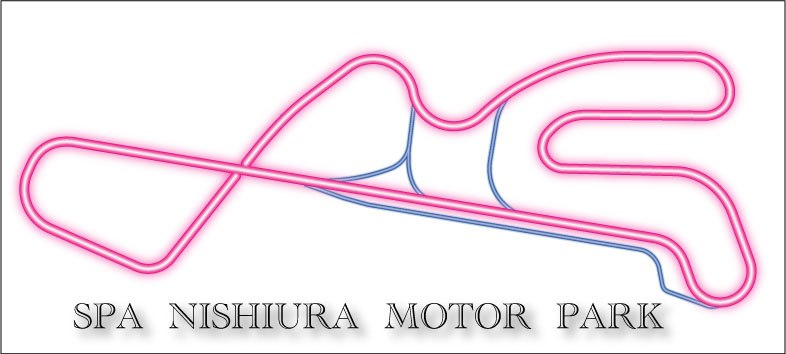
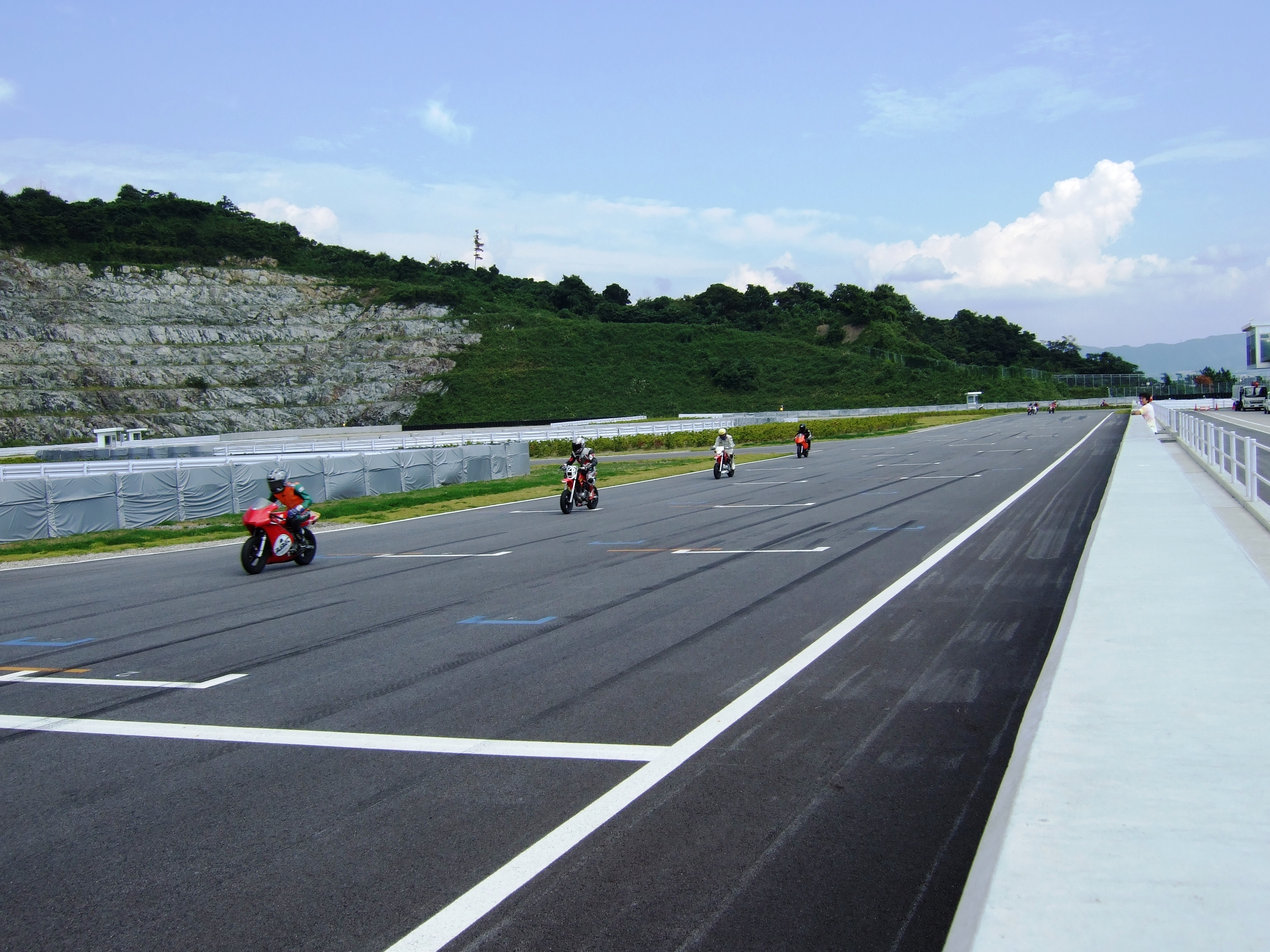
- Location: Gamagōri, Aichi, Japan
- Coordinates: 34.774429°N 137.186878°E
- Owner: Ito Racing Service
- Opened: June 9, 2007
- Surface: Asphalt
- Length: 1.561 km (0.970 mi)
- Turns: 11

Spa Nishiura Motor Park (スパ西浦モーターパーク), also known as SNMP, is a race complex near Gamagōri, Aichi, Japan.

== Course outline ==
Located on the Nishiura peninsula, SNMP circuit has an excellent view of Mikawa Bay. It was built on a former quarry.

Located on a narrow site, the course includes eleven corners, a bridge, and some elevation change. The course is also reconfigurable and available for use by motorcycles, cars and karts.
