= 1976 Rhodesian Grand Prix =

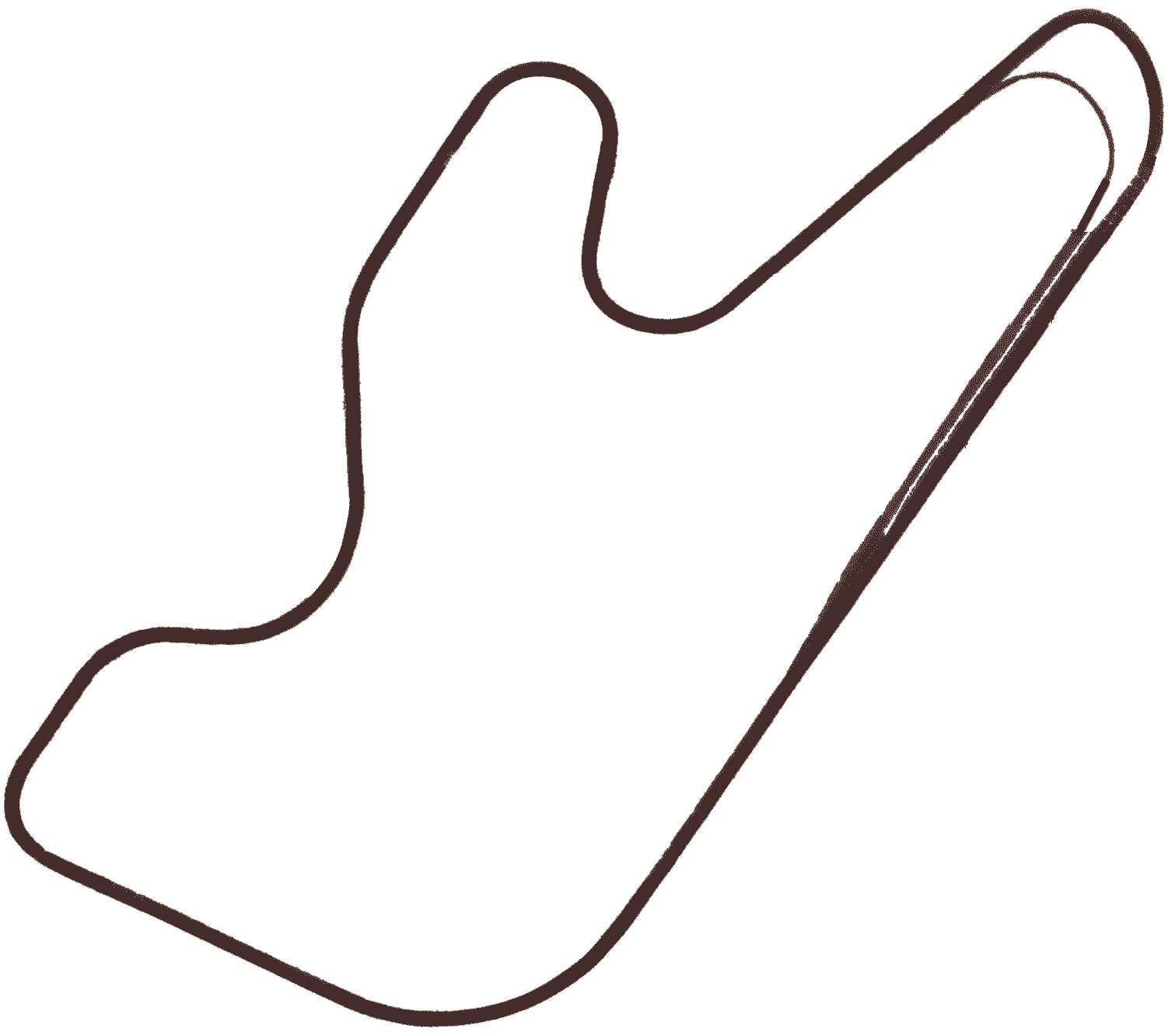
The layout of Donnybrook Raceway

The 1976 Rhodesian Grand Prix was held at Donnybrook Raceway in Salisbury, Rhodesia on 31 July 1976. It was a non-championship round of the South African Formula Atlantic series. It was won by Roy Klomfass driving a British-built Ralt RT1.

== Results ==
Pos	No.	Driver	Constructor	Sponsor	Laps
1	5	Roy Klomfass	Ralt - Ford	Team Gunston	40
2	3	Nols Nieman	Wheatcroft - Ford	Benson & Hedges /Alex Blignault	40
3	1	Dave Charlton	Modus - Ford	Lucky Strike	40
4	?	John Gibb	Chevron - Ford	Mum for Men/Pioneer Hi Fi	?
5	?	John Amm	Brabham - Ford	?	?
6	2	Tony Martin	Chevron - Ford	South Coast Motors/BIC	27
?	?	Mervyn Tunmer	March - Ford	?	?
?	?	Fred Goddard	Palliser - Ford	?	?
?	?	Gary Ainscough	March - Ford	Echlin Charger	?
?	?	Mike Domingo	Modus - Ford	Team Domingo	?
?	?	Alan Domingo	Chevron - Ford	Team Domingo	?
?	?	Joe Domingo	Chevron - Ford	Team Domingo	?

== Qualifying ==
1. Roy Klomfass (F/Atl), 1.03.6
2. Tony Martin (F/Atl), 1.04.5
3. Dave Charlton (F/Atl, 1.04.9
4. Nols Nieman (F/Atl), 1.04.9
5. John Gibb (F/Atl), 1.06.3
No other driver posted a time.
