= Chevron B21 =

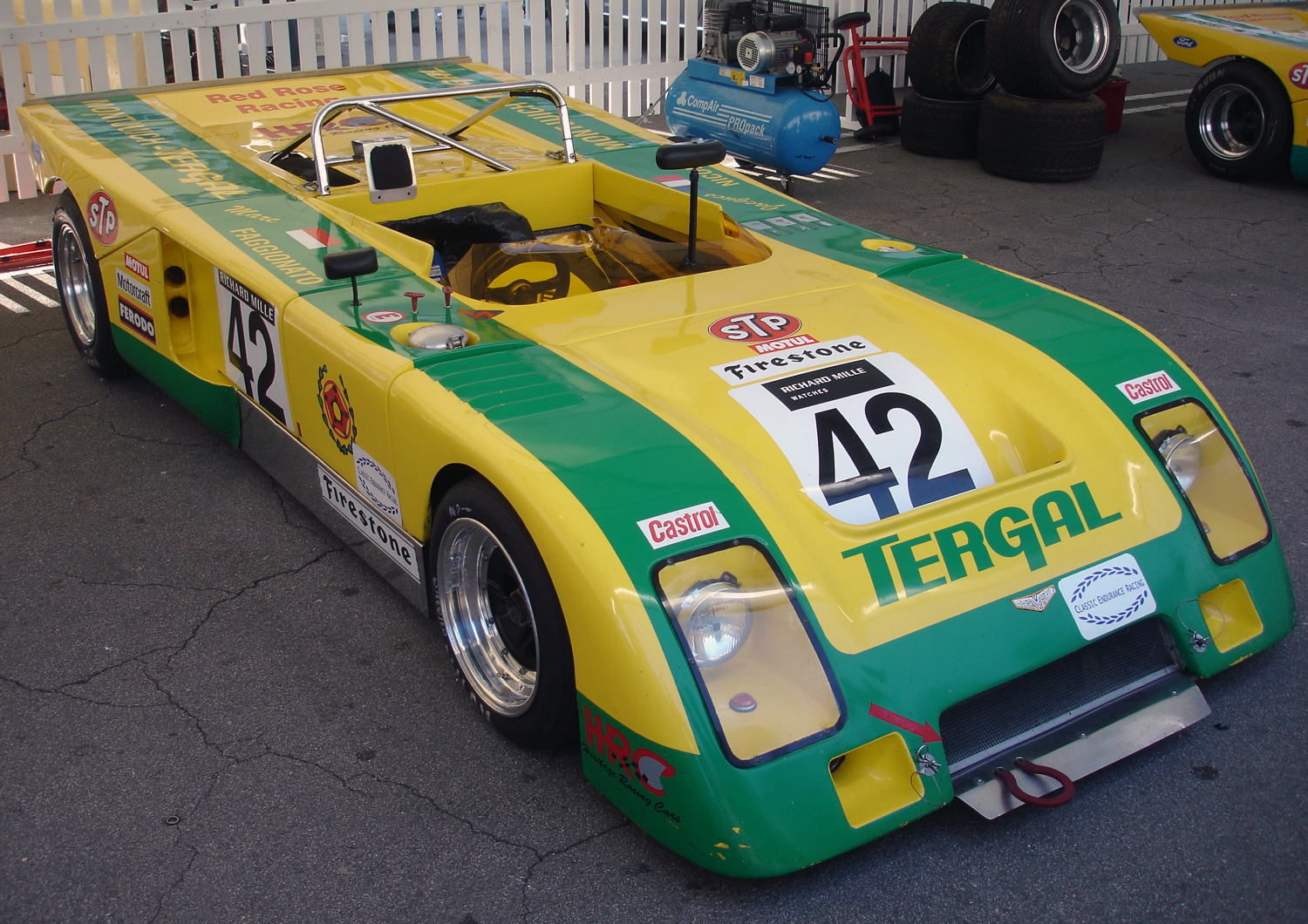
- Category: Group 5
- Constructor: Chevron
- Designer: Derek Bennett
- Production: 1972
- Predecessor: Chevron B19
- Successor: Chevron B23

Technical specifications
- Chassis: Aluminum-reinforced steel tubular space frame covered in fiberglass body panels
- Suspension (front): Double wishbones, coil springs over dampers, anti-roll bar
- Suspension (rear): Lower wishbones, top links, twin trail arms, coil springs over dampers, anti-roll bar
- Engine: Mid-engine, longitudinally mounted, 2.0 L (122 cu in), Ford-Cosworth BDG/BMW M12/7, I4, NA
- Transmission: Hewland FT-200 5-speed manual
- Power: 275 hp (205 kW).
- Weight: 1,080 lb (490 kg)

Competition history

The Chevron B21 is a 2-liter Group 5 sports prototype race car, designed, developed and built by British manufacturer Chevron, in 1972. Over its racing career, spanning 13 years, it won a total of 23 races (as well as 15 additional class wins), scored 45 podium finishes, and clinched 11 pole positions. It was powered by a naturally-aspirated 2.0 L (120 cu in) Ford-Cosworth BDG, or BMW M12/7, four-cylinder engine, both making around 275 hp (205 kW). Only 28 cars were built. It was an updated development of the Chevron B19, with revisions to the chassis and suspension to meet the requirements of contemporary sports car racing regulations. Twenty-eight B21s were built.

== Design and development ==
The B21 retained the basic design of the B19, including its lightweight construction and open-cockpit bodywork. Its chassis used a tubular steel space frame reinforced with aluminium panels and covered by a fibreglass body. For the 1972 model, Chevron revised the rear suspension mounting points and modified the cockpit divider to comply with changes to the sports car regulations.

The car was designed to accommodate different two-litre racing engines. These included the four-cylinder Cosworth BDG and BMW M12 derivatives, depending on the customer's specification. The engines were mounted longitudinally behind the driver and drove the rear wheels through a five-speed Hewland FT200 gearbox.

== Racing history ==
The B21 competed in European two-litre sports car racing and in endurance events during the 1972 season. Its results contributed to Chevron finishing second in the manufacturers' standings of the European two-litre sports car series, behind Abarth.

Dieter Quester won at the Salzburgring on 21 May 1972 in a BMW-powered B21. John Hine and John Bridges subsequently won the two-litre class at the Spa 1000 Kilometres on 7 May and the Nürburgring 1000 Kilometres on 28 May, driving a Cosworth-powered example. At the Österreichring, Rolf Stommelen and Toine Hezemans won the two-litre class in a BMW-powered B21 on 25 June.

John Burton also won a round of the European two-litre series at Montjuïc Park on 8 October 1972 in a Cosworth-powered B21, finishing second in the drivers' championship.

The B21 continued to appear in competition after its original season, including in historic racing. Some cars were subsequently modified to later specifications, which can make the histories and identification of individual chassis complicated.

== Specifications ==
The Chevron B21 used a mid-mounted, naturally aspirated four-cylinder engine and a five-speed manual transmission. Engine specification and output varied according to the version fitted. The model was succeeded by the Chevron B23 for 1973.
