= Melaka International Motorsport Circuit =

Race track in Melaka Tengah, Malacca, Malaysia

- Litar Sukan Bermotor Antarabangsa Melaka
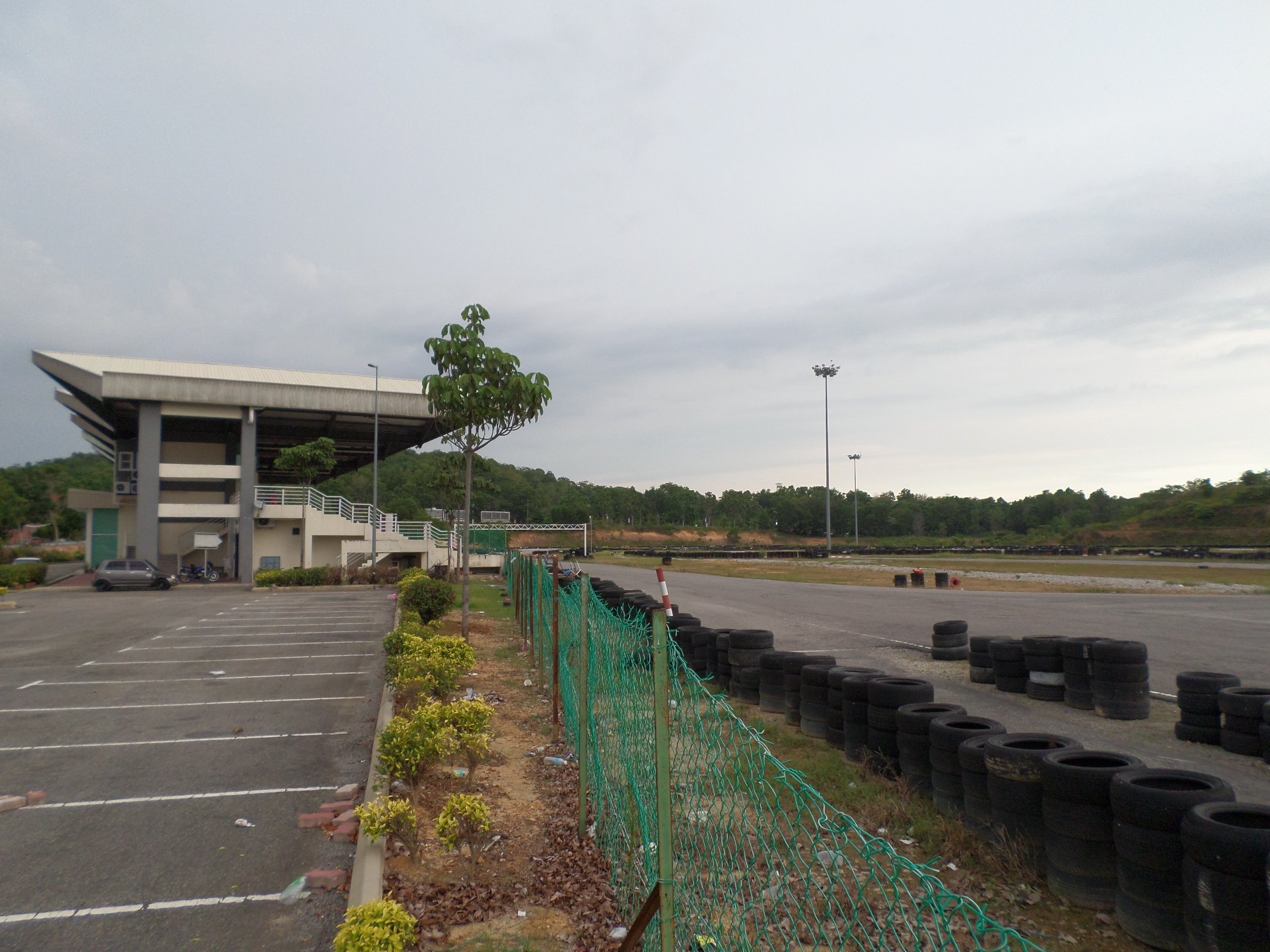
- Interactive map of Melaka International Motorsport Circuit
- Location: Durian Tunggal, Malacca, Malaysia
- Coordinates: 2°17′45.2″N 102°18′24.9″E
- Owner: Malacca State Development Corporation
- Type: Motorsport race track

Construction
- Opened: 9 May 2009
- Cost: RM 9.9 million

Melaka International Motorsport Circuit (abbreviated as MIMC, Malay: Litar Sukan Bermotor Antarabangsa Melaka) is a motorsport racetrack in Durian Tunggal town, in the Malaysian state of Malacca. It was opened in 2009 by then-chief minister Mohd Ali Rustam with four tracks within its premises: Go-kart 1.6 km track (largest international go-kart circuit in the country), Motorcycle sprint 200 meters, Night racing light 1,000 lux and Remote control car track.

The circuit area is equipped with two-tier grandstand capable to accommodate 800 visitors, parking bays, office, ticketing booth, operation room, service and inspection area and pit stops.

== See also ==
- List of tourist attractions in Malacca
