= Alexandra Park Street Circuit =

Race track in Pietermaritzburg, South Africa

- Alexandra Park Street Circuit
- Location: Pietermaritzburg, Kwa-Zulu Natal
- Coordinates: 29°37′30.6″S 30°23′8.9″E
- Opened: circa 1948
- Closed: 1953
- Major events: Motor Racing
- Length: 5.472 km (3.400 mi)

The Alexandra Park Street Circuit was a temporary race track between the late 1940s and 1953 on streets within the town of Pietermaritzburg, South Africa. This street track was no longer used after the opening of the permanent Roy Hesketh Circuit.

The track was 5.472 km (3.400 mi) long.
