= Aichi University of Technology =

- 愛知工科大学
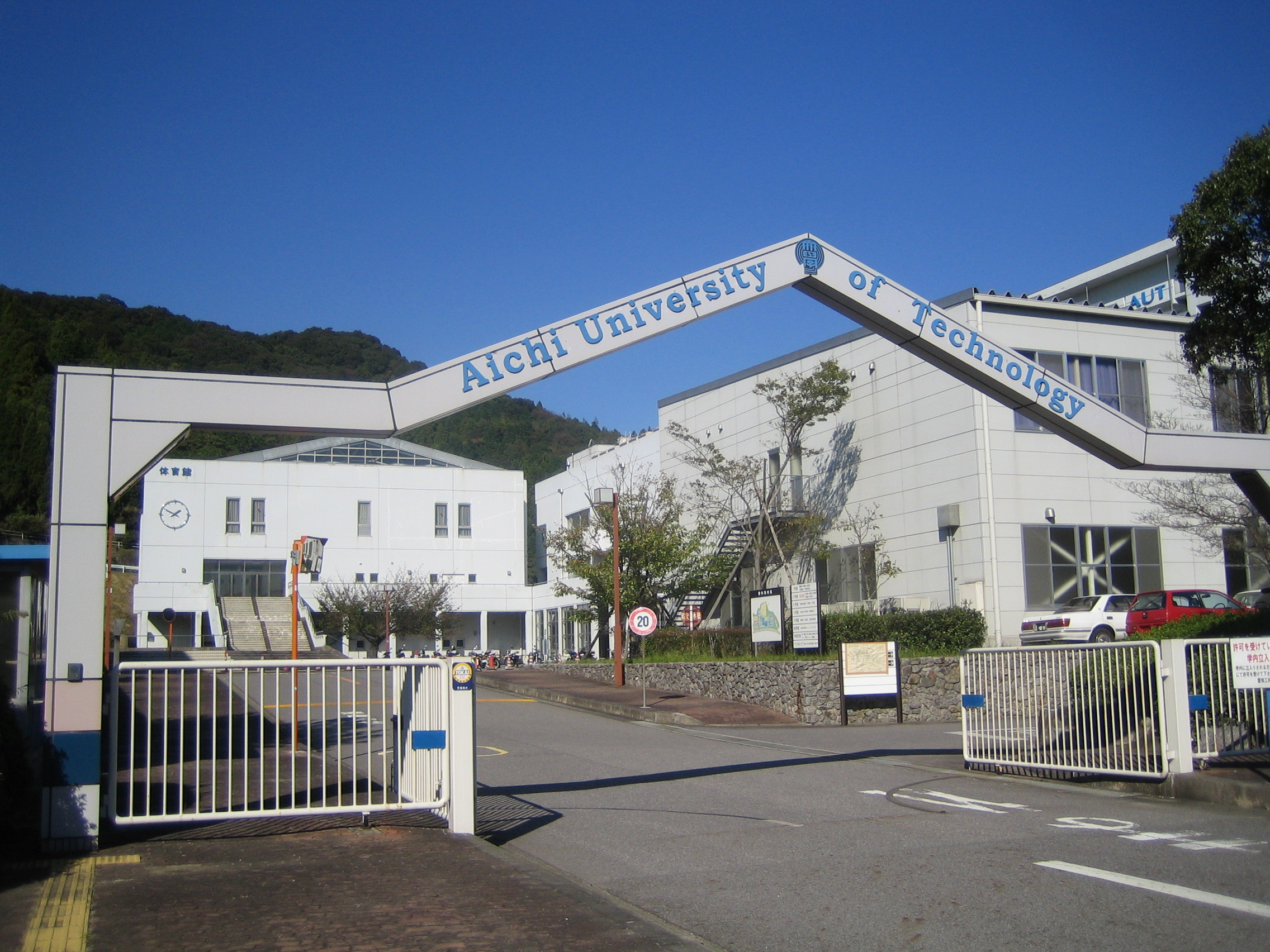
- Aichi University of Technology
- Type: Private
- Established: 1987
- President: Yasuyuki Goto (Doctor of Engineering)
- Location: Gamagōri, Aichi, Japan; 34.8320°N 137.1936°E
- Website: www.aut.ac.jp (in Japanese)

Aichi University of Technology (愛知工科大学, Aichi kōka daigaku) is a private university in Gamagōri, Aichi, Japan. The school opened as a junior college in 1987. It became a four-year in 2000.
