= Carmona Racing Circuit =

Race track in the Philippines

Carmona Race Track
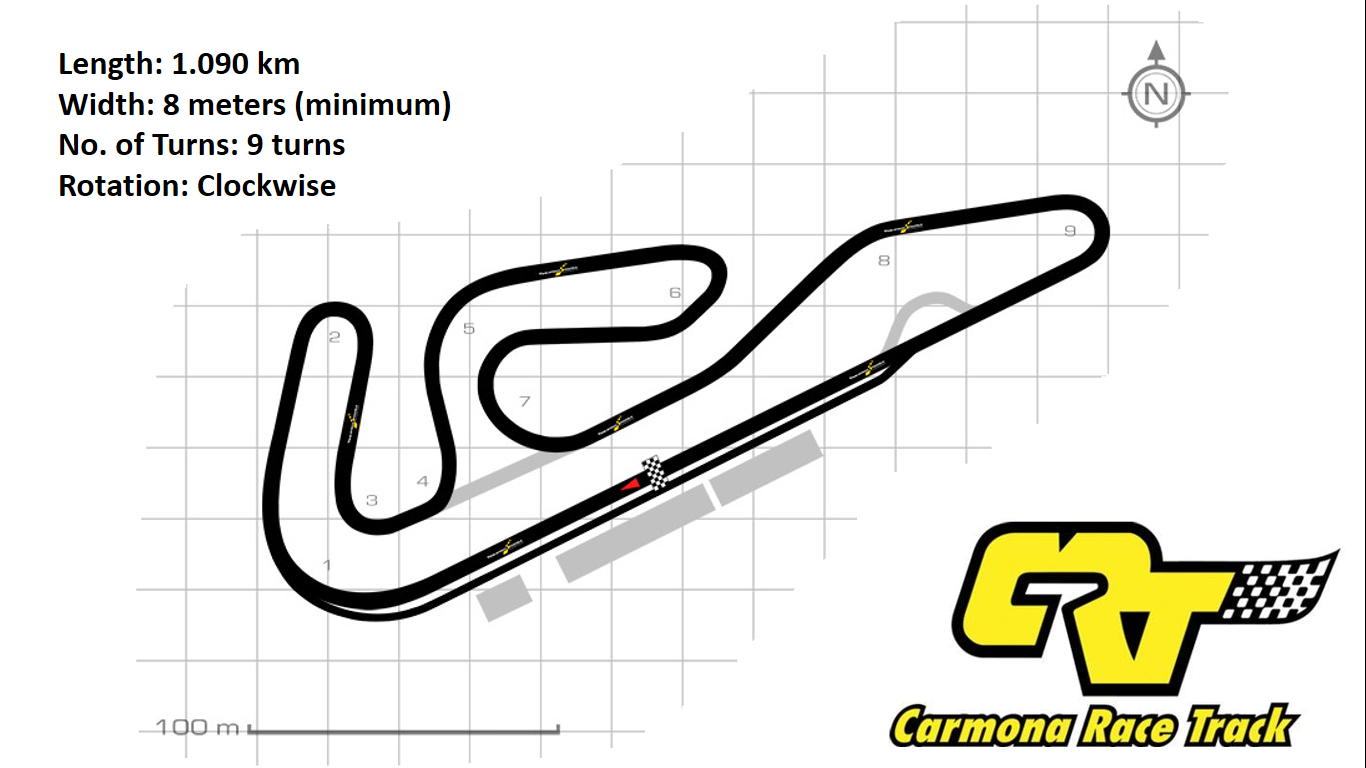
- Carmona Race Track old Layout
- Location: Barangay Bancal Carmona, Cavite, Philippines
- Coordinates: 14°16′55″N 121°0′32″E
- Opened: 1990
- Website: https://www.carmonaracetrack.com

Long Course
- Length: 1.380 km (0.857 mi)
- Turns: 15

Short Course
- Length: 1.020 km (0.634 mi)
- Turns: 9

Carmona Race Track is a permanent karting and motorbike circuit outside Metro Manila in Carmona, Cavite, Philippines.

Built in 1990, a major renovation was completed in 2019 to increase the track's length from 1.020 kilometres (0.634 mi) to 1.380 kilometres (0.857 mi) to comply with the Commission Internationale de Karting's (CIK) new minimum track length requirement. It was extended past Turn 9, which now turns left into a new sequence of right handers, then left again before shooting through a chicane that leads back to the start/finish straight. This now brings the total number of corners to 15.

== Gallery ==
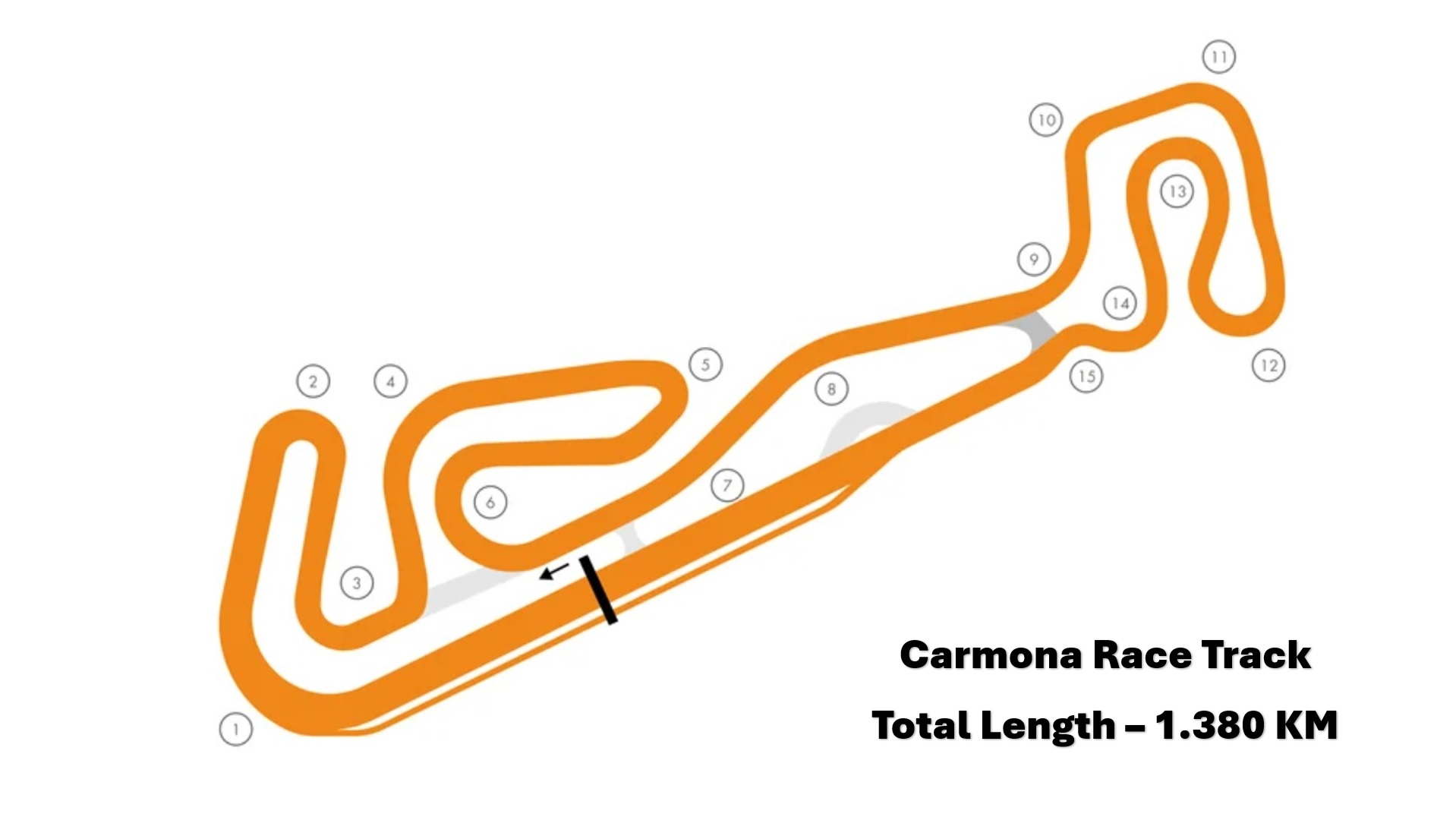
New layout

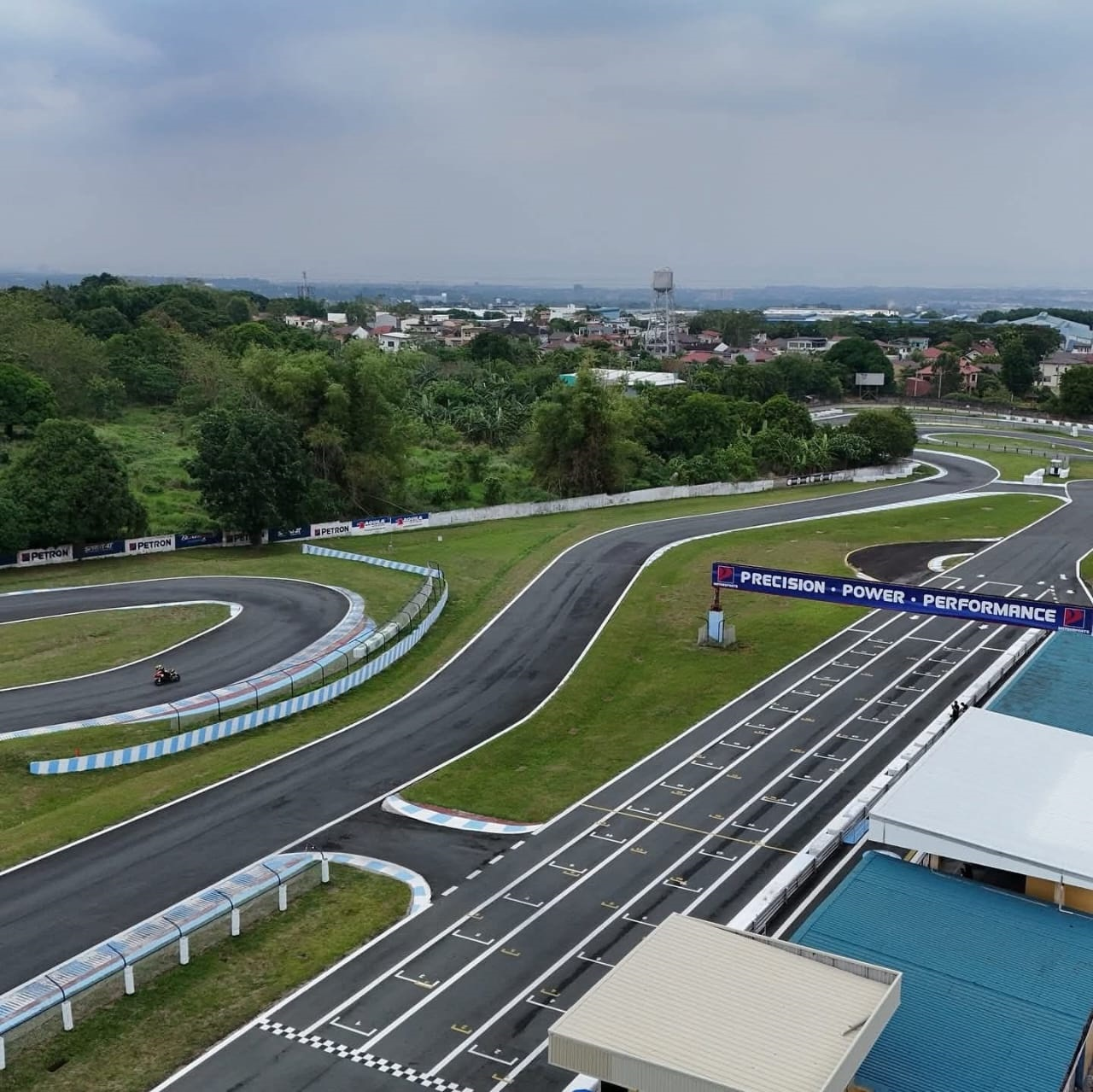
Carmona Race Track view from above
