= Sodegaura Forest Raceway =

Motorsport race track located in Chiba, Japan

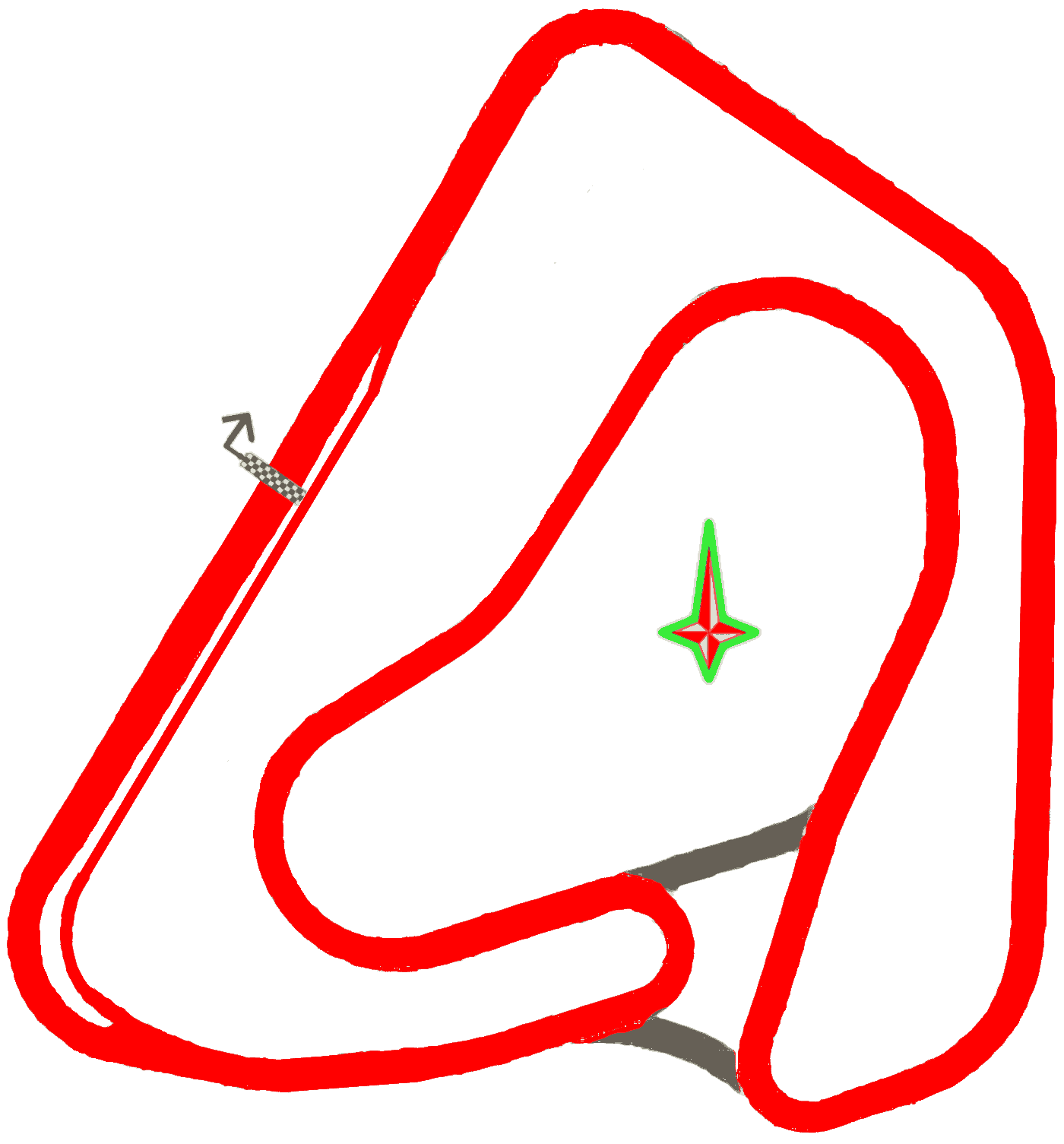
- Full Circuit (2009–present)
- Location: Sodegaura, Chiba, Japan
- Coordinates: 35°23′38″N 140°05′20″E
- Opened: 2009
- Architect: Shozaburo Nakamura
- Major events: Current: All Japan EV-GP Series (2017, 2019–present)
- Website: https://www.sodegaura-forest-raceway.com

Full Circuit (2009–present)
- Length: 2.436 km (1.514 miles)
- Turns: 14

Sodegaura Forest Raceway (袖ヶ浦フォレストレースウェイ) is a motorsport race track in Sodegaura, Chiba, Japan. The circuit is about 12 km (7.5 mi) east of Sodegaura city center and about 45 km (28 mi) southeast of Tokyo city center across Tokyo Bay.

== History ==
The circuit, which opened in 2009, was designed according to FIA standards and is officially recognized by the JAF (Japan Automobile Federation). The designer and first owner of the track was Shozaburo Nakamura, a former member of parliament from the region who was previously Minister of Justice and Director General of the Environment Agency.

== Layout ==
The route, which is a maximum of 2.436 km (1.514 mi) long and 15–18 m (49–59 ft) wide, can be ridden in 3 different configurations, 2 of which - the outer and inner loops - can be used independently of each other. The pit system has 35 boxes measuring 5.5 × 6.0 m. Due to the resident's demands, a noise limit of 95 dB applies to the emergency equipment.

== Layout configurations ==
Sodegaura Forest Raceway Layout Configurations
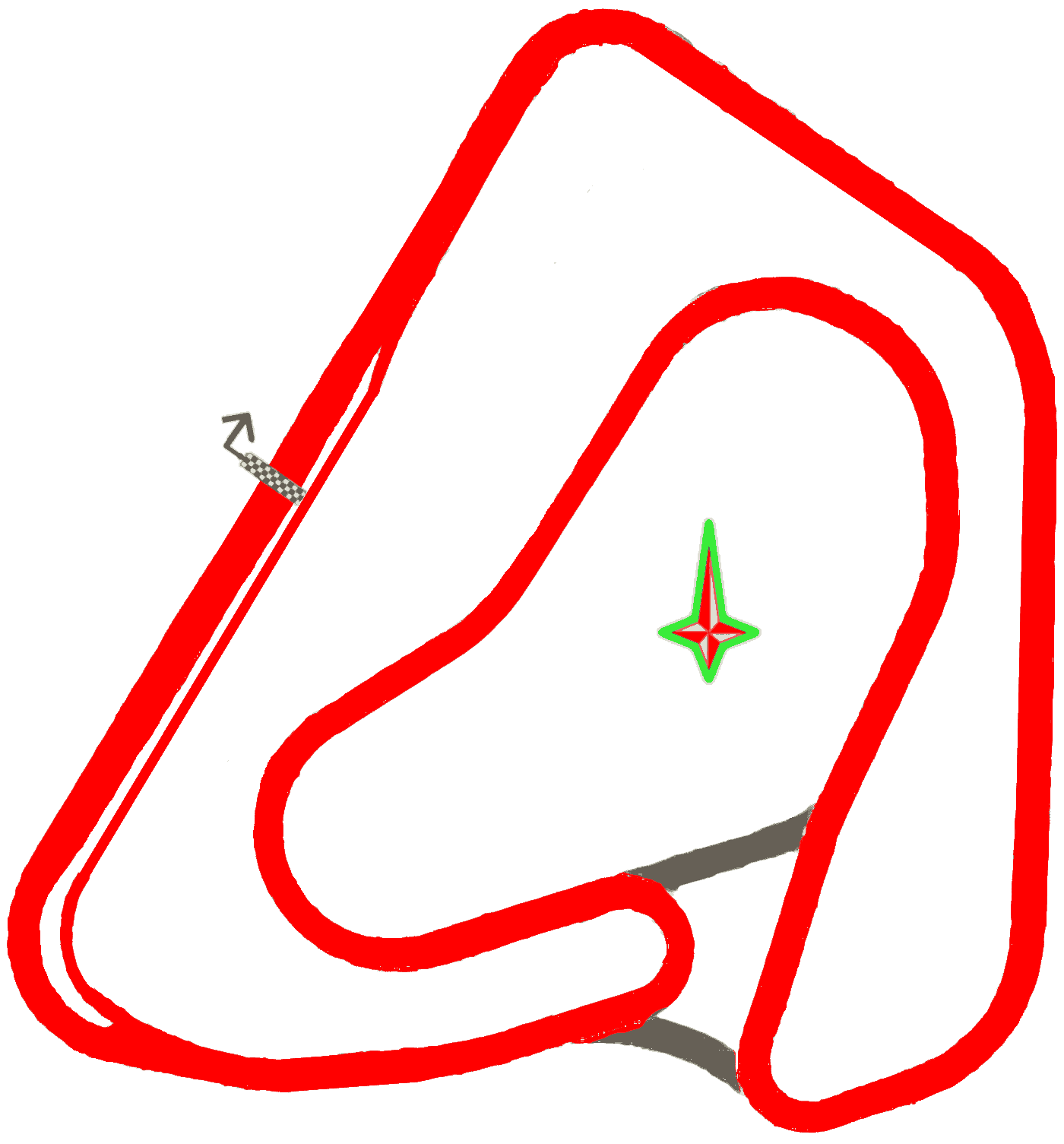
Full Circuit (2009–present)

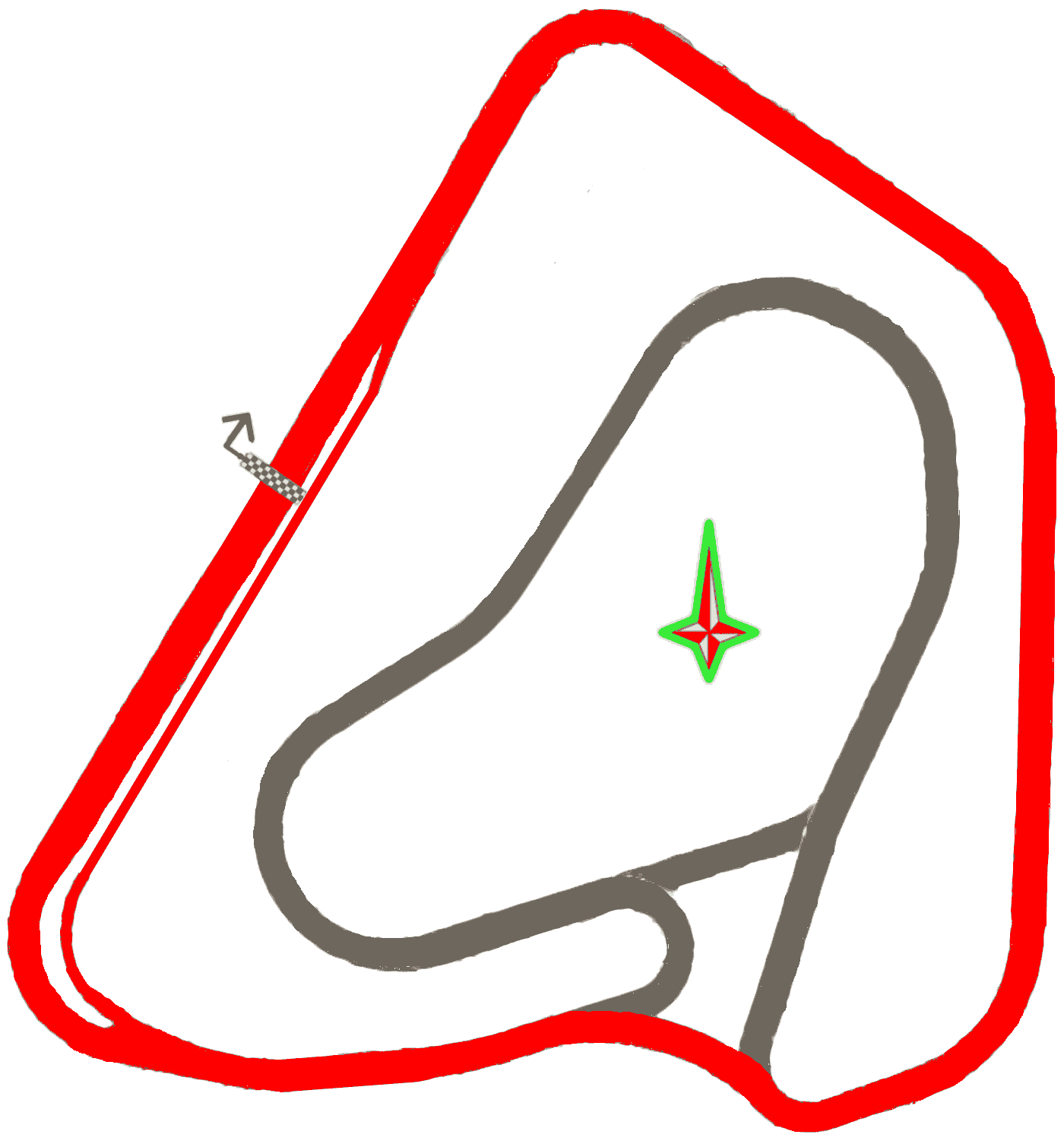
Outer Circuit (2009–present)

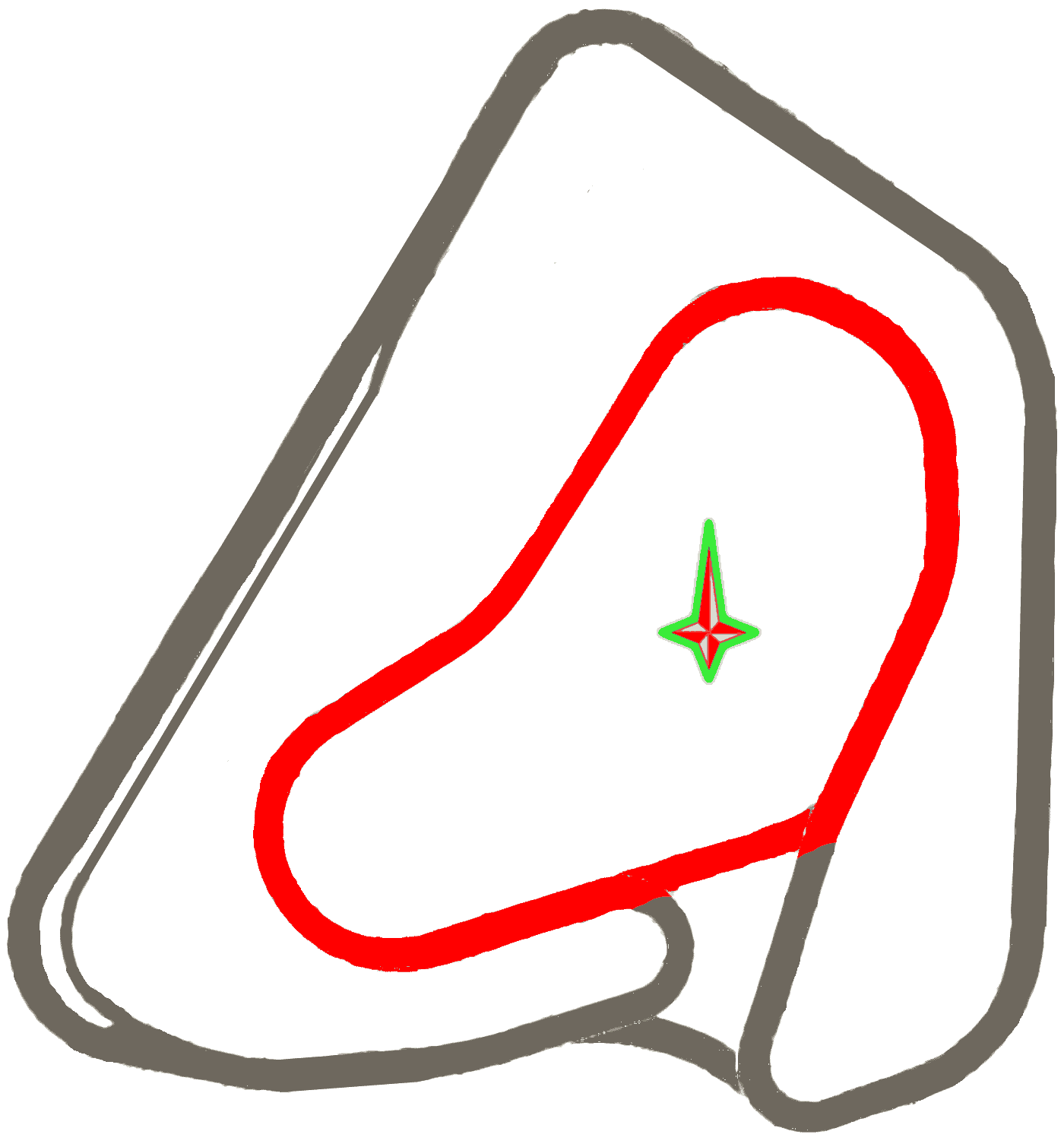
Inner Circuit (2009–present)

== Events ==
The track has been a regular stop in the All Japan EV-GP Series electric car racing series since 2017. In addition, club sport series such as the Z Challenge, the Lotus 111 Cup and the Roadster Masters series also regularly start on the course. The course is also used for track days (for cars, motorcycles and bicycles), training, test drives and vehicle presentations.
