= South African Formula Atlantic Championship =

Motor racing championship, 1976-79

- Category: Single-seaters
- Country: South Africa; Rhodesia (1976 and 1977)
- Inaugural season: 1976
- Folded: 1979
- Drivers: 26 (1978-79)
- Constructors: 4 (1978-79)
- Engine suppliers: 3 (1978-79)
- Last Drivers' champion: (South Africa) Ian Scheckter

The South African Formula Atlantic Championship was a Formula Atlantic motor racing championship held in South Africa between 1976 and 1979, including a race in Rhodesia during the 1976 (Non-Championship race) and 1977 seasons.

The final season ran between 1978 and 1979, starting just 5 months after the end of the 1978 season, was the longest season of the entire series, running from October 1978 to December 1979.

The championship was dominated by Ian Scheckter and March as Scheckter drove a March chassis to each of the four drivers' championships.

== South African Formula Atlantic Champions ==
Season	Champion	Car	Wins	Podiums	Points	Margin (pts.)
1976	(South Africa) Ian Scheckter	March 76B-Ford BDA	7	8	69	25
1977	(South Africa) Ian Scheckter	March 77B-Ford BDA	6	7	63	9
1978	(South Africa) Ian Scheckter	March 78B-Ford BDD	3	5	46	11
1978-79	(South Africa) Ian Scheckter	March 78B-Ford BDD; March 79A-Ford BDD; March 79A-Mazda 12A	13	14		
