= Chevron B19 =

Sports prototype race car

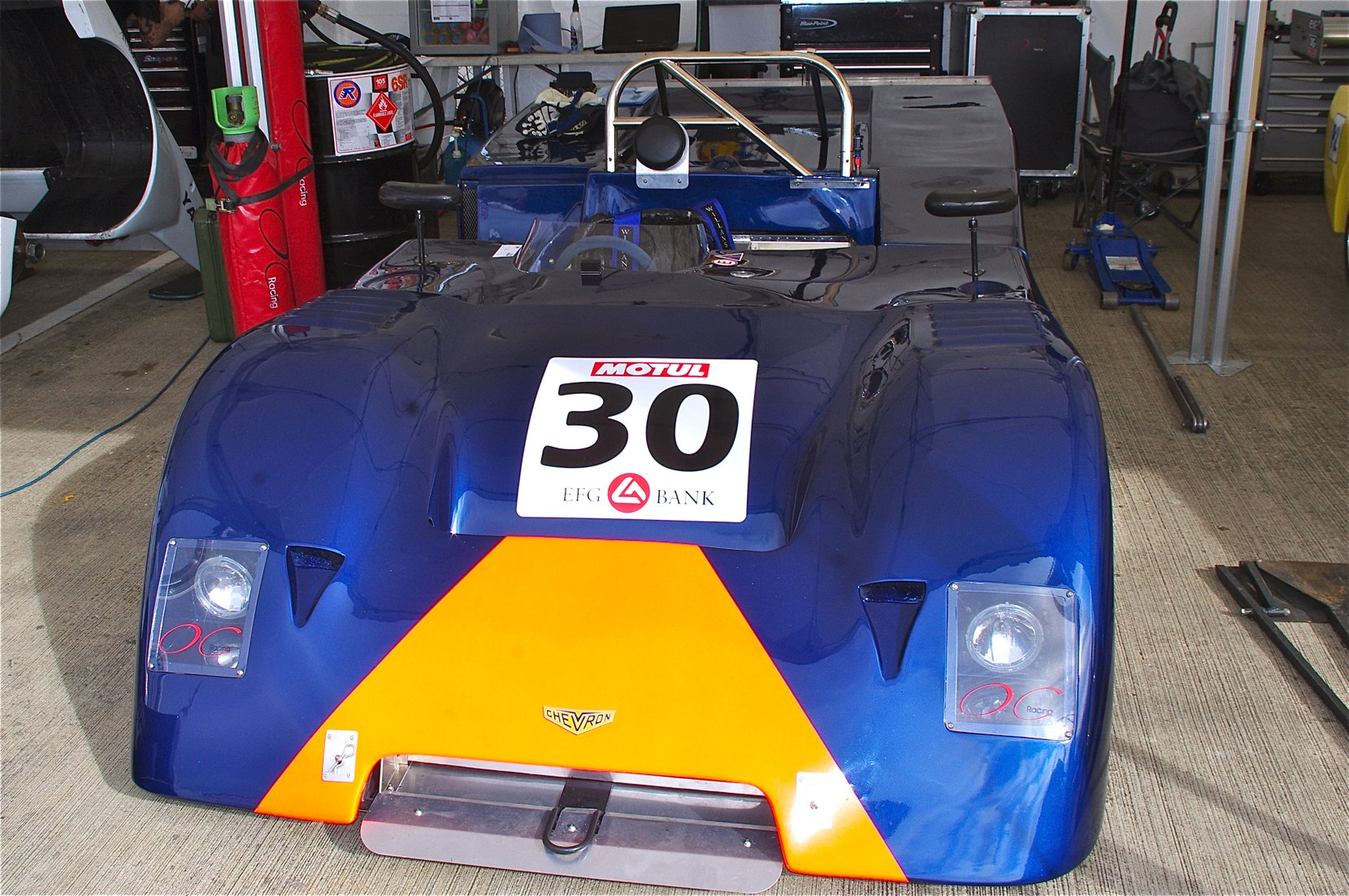
- Category: Group 6
- Constructor: Chevron
- Designer(s): Derek Bennett
- Production: 1970-1971
- Predecessor: Chevron B16
- Successor: Chevron B21

Technical specifications
- Chassis: Aluminum-reinforced steel tubular space frame covered in fiberglass body panels
- Suspension (front): Double wishbones, coil springs over dampers, anti-roll bar
- Suspension (rear): Lower wishbones, top links, twin trail arms, coil springs over dampers, anti-roll bar
- Engine: Mid-engine, longitudinally mounted, 1.8 L (110 cu in), Cosworth FVC, I4, NA
- Transmission: Hewland FT-200 5-speed manual
- Weight: 550 kg (1,210 lb)

Competition history

The Chevron B19 is a 2-liter sports prototype race car, designed, developed and built by British manufacturer Chevron in 1971. Only 35 cars were built.
