= South African Drivers Championship =

Formula One championship held in South Africa

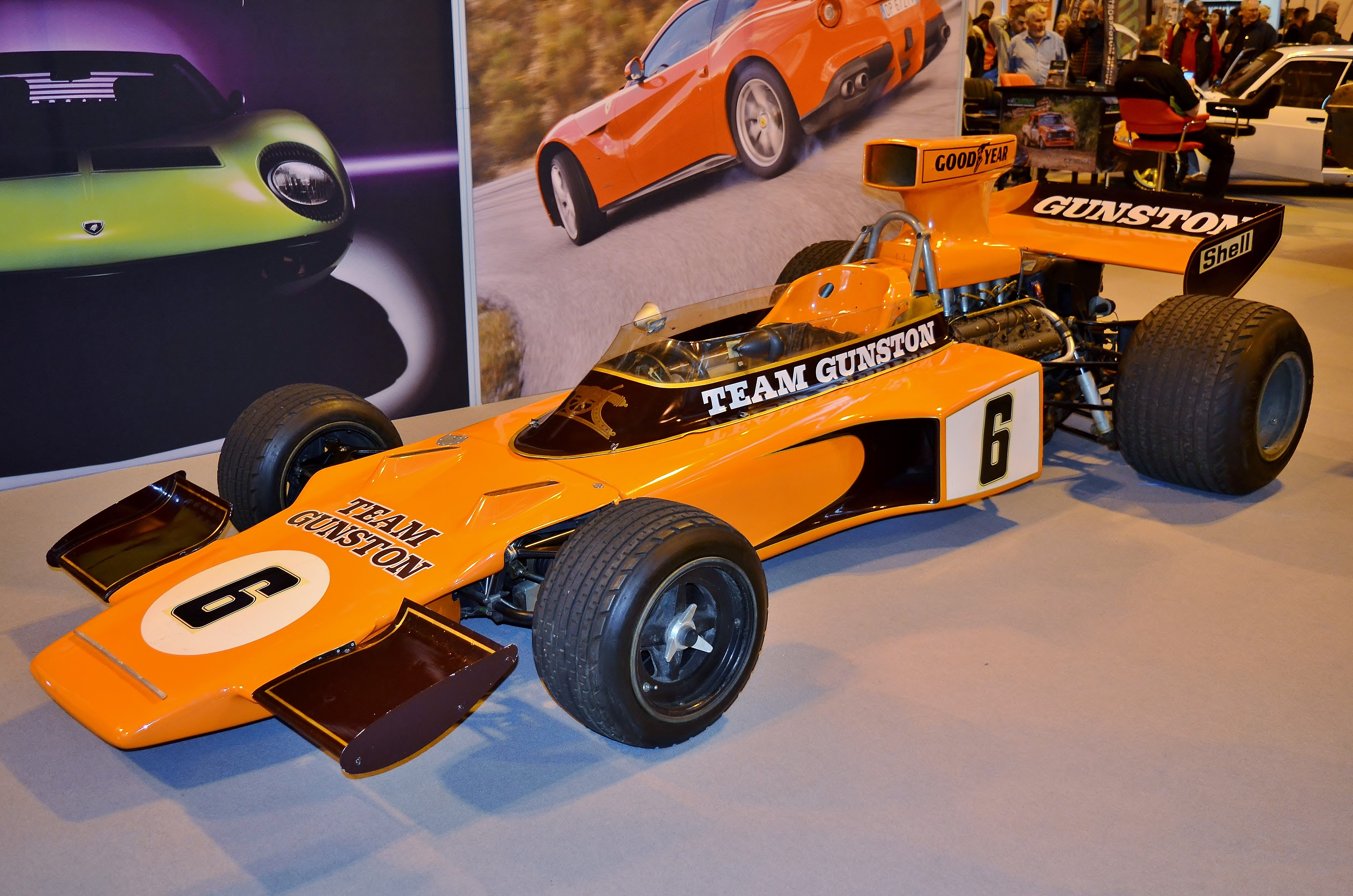
- Lotus 72D raced by Ian Scheckter in the 1974 South African National Drivers Championship and 1975 South African Grand Prix
- Category: Single-seaters
- Country: South Africa; Rhodesia; Portuguese Mozambique
- Inaugural season: 1953
- Folded: 1986
- Drivers: 14 (1975)
- Teams: 10 (1975)
- Constructors: 7 (1975)
- Engine suppliers: 2 (1975)
- Last Drivers' champion: (South Africa) Wayne Taylor

South African Formula One Championship
- Category: Formula One
- Country: South Africa; Rhodesia; Portuguese Mozambique
- Inaugural season: 1975
- Folded: 1975
- Drivers: 14
- Teams: 10
- Constructors: 7
- Engine suppliers: 2
- Last Drivers' champion: (South Africa) Dave Charlton

The South African Drivers Championship, was a national motor racing championship held in South Africa between 1953 and 1986, including races in Rhodesia and Portuguese Mozambique.

Initially running as Formula Libre catering for local Specials and pre-war Grand Prix cars, the series switched to Formula One regulations in 1960. It changed again to Formula Atlantic in 1976 before adopting a multi-engine Formula South Africa rules set in 1979 and then running exclusively on Mazda 12B rotary engines from 1980 to its final year in 1986.

== History ==
From the early-1960s, the front-running cars in the series were recently retired from the world championship although there was also a healthy selection of locally built or modified machines. From the late 60s Formula 5000 added to grids with Formula Two cars joining in 1973. Front-running drivers from the series usually contested their local World Championship South African Grand Prix, as well as occasional European events, although they had little success at that level.

1967 saw a remarkable result by Rhodesian driver John Love with a 2.7 litre four-cylinder Cooper-Climax; Love was in his forties and, although seen as one of the finest drivers in Southern Africa, was not a major star. He led and finished second in that year's South African Grand Prix. Love's Cooper was originally designed for the short races of the Tasman Series, and to run a full Grand Prix, he added two auxiliary fuel tanks. Unfortunately, the auxiliary tanks' fuel pump failure forced him to refuel after having led most of the race.

Love and Dave Charlton both won the South African Formula One championship for six consecutive seasons, Love from 1964 to 1969 and Charlton from 1970 to 1975. In 1975 Ian Scheckter raced the Tyrrell 007 that had been campaigned by brother, Jody, in the previous year's world championship and won five of the season's races, including four on the trot. However, he only had one other points finish, fifth place at the False Bay "100" on 5 July, giving him a points total of 47 for the season. Charlton proved more consistent with three victories and five second-place finishes to give him a points total of 57. By winning the Natal Spring Trophy at Roy Hesketh Circuit on 1 September, Charlton joined Rhodesian John Love as a six-time winner of the South African Drivers Championship. Charlton ended the South African Formula One Championship by winning the final race of the season, the Rand Spring Trophy at Kyalami on 4 October after the faster Scheckter retired with a driveshaft problem.

Primarily owing to cost and dwindling grids, the Formula One championship was replaced at the end of the 1975 season with Formula Atlantic. The South Africans had tried to build interest by padding the field with Formula 2 and Formula 5000 cars, but viewership was in steady decline, not helped by a somewhat Byzantine points system. 1976 would see the start of the domination of South Africa's National Championship by Ian Scheckter. Indeed, had it not been for youthful exuberance, Scheckter may have won the 1975 title. He won more races than Charlton, but Charlton was more consistent. Scheckter won the first four championships in a row for Lexington Racing before United Tobacco Company withdrew their teams (Lexington, Gunston and Texan). With Gunston returning in 1983, Scheckter returned to the Championship and won a further two championships to match Love and Charlton as a six-time winner.

== South African Drivers Champions ==
Season	Champion	Car	Wins	Podiums	Points	Margin (pts.)
1953	(South Africa) Douglas Duff	Riley	2	5	34	20
1954	(South Africa) Bill Jennings	Jennings Riley Special	2	4	28	3
1955	(South Africa) Frank Brodie	Brodie MG Special	2	6	22	3
1956	(South Africa) Bill Jennings	Jennings Riley Special	3	4	18	6
1957	(South Africa) Bill Jennings	Jennings Riley Special	3	5	32	18
1958	(South Africa) Ian Fraser-Jones	Cooper Mk VI Porsche; Porsche 550A	5	6	36	12
1959	(South Africa) Ian Fraser-Jones	Porsche 550A	3	6	40	14
1960	(South Africa) Syd van der Vyver	Cooper T43-Alfa Romeo	5	6	43	11
1961	(South Africa) Syd van der Vyver	Lotus 18-Alfa Romeo	2	5	40	1
1962	(South Africa) Ernest Pieterse	Heron-Alfa Romeo; Lotus 21-Climax	8	9	53	16
1963	(South Africa) Neville Lederle	Lotus 21-Climax	6	7	54	24
1964	(Rhodesia) John Love	Cooper T55-Climax	6	9	58	3
1965	(Rhodesia) John Love	Cooper T55-Climax; Cooper T79-Climax	13	16	54	8
1966	(Rhodesia) John Love	Cooper T79-Climax	7	8	69	13
1967	(Rhodesia) John Love	Cooper T79-Climax; Brabham BT20-Repco	8	10	82	30
1968	(Rhodesia) John Love	Brabham BT20-Repco; Lotus 49-Ford Cosworth DFV	6	6	54	14
1969	(Rhodesia) John Love	Lotus 49-Ford Cosworth DFV	4	5	43	1
1970	(South Africa) Dave Charlton	Lotus 49C-Ford Cosworth DFV	7	8	69	32
1971	(South Africa) Dave Charlton	Lotus 49C-Ford Cosworth DFV; Lotus 72D-Ford Cosworth DFV	7	8	72	24
1972	(South Africa) Dave Charlton	Lotus 72D-Ford Cosworth DFV	9	9	81	39
1973	(South Africa) Dave Charlton	Lotus 72D-Ford Cosworth DFV	10	10	93	40
1974	(South Africa) Dave Charlton	McLaren M23-Ford Cosworth DFV	6	10	76	11
1975	(South Africa) Dave Charlton	McLaren M23-Ford Cosworth DFV	3	5	57	10
1976	(South Africa) Ian Scheckter	March 76B-Ford Cosworth BDD	7	8	69	15
1977	(South Africa) Ian Scheckter	March 77B-Ford Cosworth BDD	6	7	63	9
1978	(South Africa) Ian Scheckter	March 78B-Ford Cosworth BDD	4	5	46	11
1979	(South Africa) Ian Scheckter	March 79B-Ford Cosworth BDD; March 79B-Fiat 2.0; March 79B-Mazda rotary	11	12	99	42
1980	(South Africa) Tony Martin	Chevron B34-Mazda rotary Chevron B45-Mazda rotary	12	13	144	71
1981	(South Africa) Bernard Tilanus	Ralt RT2-Mazda rotary March 722/78B-Mazda rotary March 77B-Mazda rotary	5	11	122	1
1982	(South Africa) Graham Duxbury	March 77B Mazda rotary March 822-Mazda rotary	6	9	114	8
1983	(South Africa) Ian Scheckter	March 822/32-Mazda	10	13	168	73
1984	(South Africa) Ian Scheckter	March 822/32-Mazda	13	15	155	40
1985	(South Africa) Trevor van Rooyen	Maurer MM83-Mazda	9	11	154	32
1986	(South Africa) Wayne Taylor	Ralt RT4/82-Mazda	4	6	78	12
