= Ian Scheckter =

South African racing driver (born 1947)

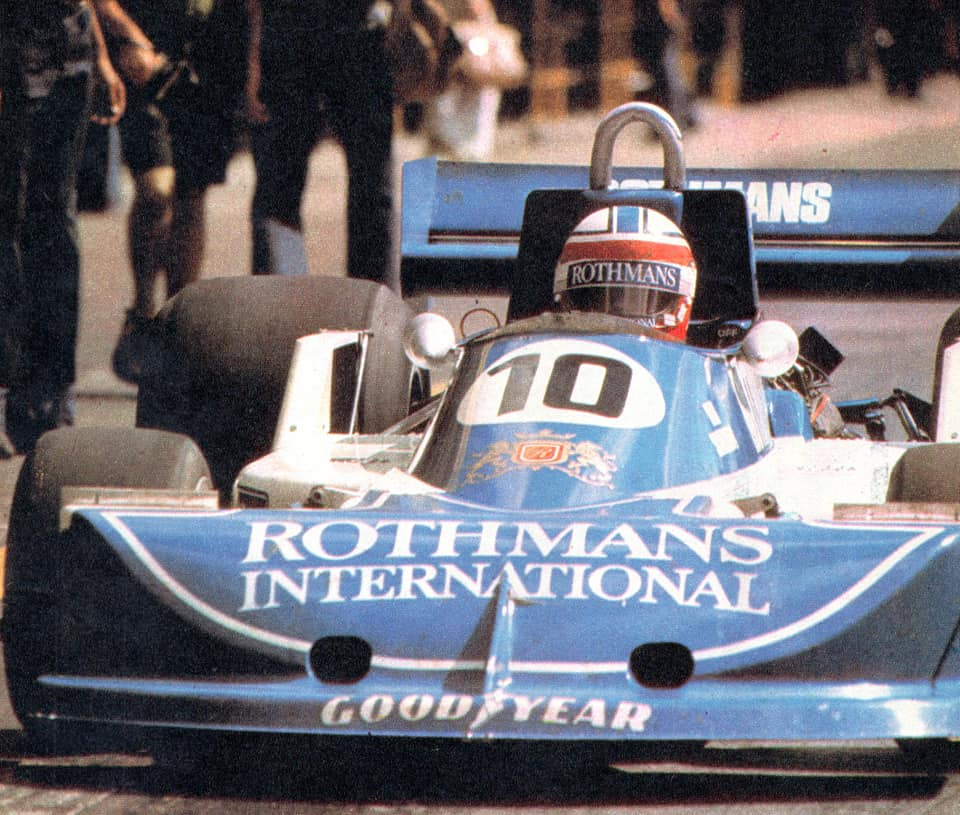
- Scheckter in the 1977 Argentine Grand Prix
- Born: 22 August 1947 (age 79); East London, South Africa

Formula One World Championship career
- Nationality: (South Africa) South African
- Active years: 1974–1977
- Team(s): March, Williams, various non-works teams
- Entries: 20 (18 starts)
- Championships: 0
- Wins: 0
- Podiums: 0
- Career points: 0
- Pole positions: 0
- Fastest laps: 0
- First entry: 1974 South African Grand Prix
- Last entry: 1977 Canadian Grand Prix

Ian Scheckter (born 22 August 1947) is a South African former racing driver. He participated in 20 Formula One World Championship Grands Prix, debuting on 30 March 1974. He scored no championship points.

== Biography ==
The elder brother of 1979 Formula One champion Jody Scheckter and uncle of IRL racer Tomas Scheckter, his first F1 races were in the South African Grand Prix, first driving a Lotus 72 for locals Team Gunston in 1974. The following year and also in 1976, he drove a Tyrrell 007 for Lexington Racing, either side of a couple of European outings for Williams.

In domestic racing, Scheckter came close to ending the run of Dave Charlton of titles in the South African National Drivers Championship in 1975, but in his two spells as a full-time competitor dominated the championship winning 49 races and equalling John Love and Charlton's tally of six championships.

Securing enough funds for a full season with the March works F1 team in 1977, Scheckter turned in some poor performances, aided in great part by the fact that, in some races, Team March had up to five drivers signed; lacking resources to provide adequately for them all. This situation spelled the end of his F1 career. Scheckter's final Grand Prix would have been the 1977 Japanese Grand Prix, but he was detained and then expelled from Japan due to only having a tourist visa in his South African passport and Japanese objections to the South African apartheid regime.

== Complete Formula One World Championship results ==
(key)

Year	Entrant	Chassis	Engine	1	2	3	4	5	6	7	8	9	10	11	12	13	14	15	16	17	WDC	Points
1974	Team Gunston	Lotus 72E	Cosworth V8	ARG	BRA	RSA; 13	ESP	BEL	MON	SWE	NED	FRA	GBR	GER							NC	0
1974	Hesketh Racing	Hesketh 308	Cosworth V8												AUT; DNQ	ITA	CAN	USA			NC	0
1975	Lexington Racing	Tyrrell 007	Cosworth V8	ARG	BRA	RSA; Ret	ESP	MON	BEL												NC	0
1975	Williams Ambrozium H7 Racing	Williams FW03	Cosworth V8							SWE; Ret		FRA	GBR	GER	AUT	ITA	USA				NC	0
1975	Frank Williams Racing Cars	Williams FW03	Cosworth V8								NED; 12										NC	0
1976	Lexington Racing	Tyrrell 007	Cosworth V8	BRA	RSA; Ret	USW	ESP	BEL	MON	SWE	FRA	GBR	GER	AUT	NED	ITA	CAN	USA	JPN		NC	0
1977	Rothmans International Racing	March 761B	Cosworth V8	ARG; Ret	BRA; Ret	RSA	USW	ESP; 11	MON; DNQ	BEL; Ret	SWE; Ret	FRA; NC	GBR; Ret	GER; Ret	AUT; Ret						NC	0
1977	Rothmans International Racing	March 771	Cosworth V8													NED; 10	ITA; Ret	USA; Ret	CAN; Ret	JPN	NC	0

== See also ==
- List of select Jewish racing drivers

Sporting positions
Preceded by Dave Charlton	South African Formula Atlantic; Champion; 1976–1979	Succeeded by Tony Martin
Preceded by Graham Duxbury	Formula South Africa; Champion; 1983–1984	Succeeded by Trevor van Rooyen
