= List of motor racing tracks =

This is a list of auto racing and moto racing circuits sorted by country.

Note: Circuits carrying a "†" were, are, or will be hosting Formula One and/or MotoGP Grand Prix.

== Albania ==
=== Under construction ===
- Auto Moto Park Albania, Elbasan

== Algeria ==
=== Temporary circuits ===
==== Defunct ====
- Circuit Automobile d'Arcole, Bir El Djir
- Circuit de Bouzaréah, Bouzaréah
- Circuit Urbain de Staouéli, Staouéli

== Andorra ==
=== Ice racing circuits ===
- Circuit Andorra, Pas de la Casa, Andorra la Vella

== Angola ==
=== Permanent circuits ===
- Autódromo de Luanda, Luanda

==== Defunct ====
- Autódromo de Benguela, Benguela

=== Temporary circuits ===
==== Defunct ====
- Circuito Antigo de Carmona, Uíge
- Circuito Automóvel das Festas do Mar, Moçâmedes
- Circuito da Fortaleza, Luanda
- Circuito da Huíla, Lubango
- Circuito de Namibe, Namibe Province
- Circuito de Nova Lisboa, Huambo
- Circuito de Novo Redondo, Sumbe
- Circuito Novo de Carmona, Uíge
- Circuito Urbano do Malanje, Malanje

== Antigua and Barbuda ==
=== Dirt tracks ===
- Crabbs Raceway, Parham Peninsula
- Reservoir Range Racetrack, Pares

=== Dragstrips ===
- John I Martin Race Track, St. John's
- North Sound International Raceway, Piggotts

== Argentina ==
=== Permanent circuits ===
- Autódromo Ciudad de Concordia, Concordia, Entre Ríos
- Autódromo Ciudad de Dolores, Dolores, Buenos Aires
- Autódromo Ciudad de La Rioja, La Rioja
- Autódromo Ciudad de Mar del Plata, Mar del Plata, Buenos Aires
- Autódromo Ciudad de Nueve de Julio - Guillermo Yoyo Maldonado, 9 de Julio, Buenos Aires
- Autódromo Ciudad de Oberá, Oberá, Misiones
- Autódromo Ciudad de Paraná, Paraná, Entre Ríos
- Autódromo Ciudad de Pigüé, Pigüé, Buenos Aires
- Autódromo Ciudad de Rafaela, a.k.a. Autódromo Ing. Juan R. Báscolo, Rafaela, Santa Fe
- Autódromo Ciudad de Viedma, Viedma, Río Negro
- Autódromo de Baradero, Baradero
- Autódromo de Concepción del Uruguay, Concepción del Uruguay, Entre Ríos
- Autódromo Eduardo Copello, San Juan
- Autódromo Enrique Freile, El Calafate, Santa Cruz Province
- Autódromo Eusebio Marcilla, Junín, Buenos Aires
- Autódromo Ezequiel Crisol, Bahía Blanca, Buenos Aires
- Autódromo General San Martín (Comodoro Rivadavia), Comodoro Rivadavia, Patagonia
- Autódromo Harry Regensburger, Caleta Olivia
- Autódromo Hermanos Emiliozzi, Olavarría, Buenos Aires
- Autódromo Jorge Ángel Pena, San Martin, Mendoza
- Autódromo José Muñiz, Río Gallegos, Santa Cruz
- Autódromo Juan Manuel Fangio, Balcarce, Buenos Aires
- Autódromo Juan María Traverso, San Nicolás de los Arroyos, Buenos Aires
- Autódromo Juan Oria, Marcos Juárez, Córdoba

†	Formula One GP Venue; MotoGP GP Venue	Autódromo Oscar y Juan Gálvez, Buenos Aires

- Autódromo Las Paredes, San Rafael, Mendoza
- Autódromo Mar y Valle, Trelew, Chubut
- Autódromo Martín Miguel de Güemes, Salta
- Autódromo Municipal de Avellaneda, Avellaneda, Santa Fe
- Autódromo Municipal Juan Manuel Fangio, Rosario, Santa Fe
- Autódromo Oscar Cabalén, Alta Gracia, Córdoba
- Autódromo Parque Ciudad de General Roca, General Roca, Río Negro
- Autódromo Parque Ciudad de Río Cuarto, Río Cuarto, Córdoba
- Autódromo Parque de la Velocidad de San Jorge, San Jorge (Santa Fe), Santa Fe
- Autódromo Parque Provincia del Neuquén, Centenario, Neuquén
- Autódromo Provincia de La Pampa, Toay, La Pampa
- Autódromo Roberto José Mouras, La Plata, Buenos Aires
- Autódromo Rosamonte, Posadas, Misiones
- Autódromo Rosendo Hernández, San Luis, San Luis
- Autódromo Santiago Yaco Guarnieri, Resistencia, Chaco

†	MotoGP GP Venue	Autódromo Termas de Río Hondo, Termas de Río Hondo, Santiago del Estero

- Circuito Costanero Arrecifes, Arrecifes
- Circuito San Juan Villicum, Albardón, San Juan

==== Defunct ====
- Autódromo de Maggiolo, Santa Fe
- Autódromo Don Eduardo, Las Parejas
- Autódromo Enrique Mosconi, Allen, Rio Negro
- Autódromo General San Martín (Mendoza), Mendoza
- Autódromo Luis Rubén Di Palma, Mar de Ajó, Buenos Aires
- Autódromo Nasif Estéfano, San Miguel de Tucumán, Tucumán
- Autódromo Pablo Vivas, Godoy Cruz
- Autódromo Parque Ciudad de Santa Rosa, Santa Rosa, La Pampa
- Autódromo Parque General San Martín, Buenos Aires
- Autódromo Roberto Hirsch, Miramar
- Circuito Óscar Zambano, Buenos Aires
- Parque Studebaker, Villa Cañás

=== Temporary circuits ===
- Autódromo José Carlos Bassi, Villa Mercedes, San Luis

==== Defunct ====
- Autódromo Semipermanente Pinamar, Pinamar
- Circuito Alturas de Punilla, La Cumbre
- Circuito Arturo Kruuse, Zapala
- Circuito Benedicto Campos, Necochea
- Circuito Costanera, Buenos Aires
- Circuito Callejero de la Ciudad de Buenos Aires, Buenos Aires
- Circuito de la Siderurgia Argentina, San Nicolás de los Arroyos
- Circuito Palermo, Palermo
- Circuito Parque Independencia, Rosario
- Circuito Punta Indios, Veronica, Buenos Aires
- Circuito Retiro, Retiro, Buenos Aires
- Circuito Semipermanente Jorge Martínez Boero, San Carlos de Bolívar
- Gran Premio de Santa Fe, Santa Fe, Santa Fe
- Parque Sarmiento, Córdoba
- Potrero de los Funes Circuit, San Luis, San Luis
- Puerto Madero Street Circuit, Puerto Madero, Buenos Aires
- Triángulo del Tuyú, Santa Teresita, Buenos Aires

== Armenia ==
=== Under construction ===
- Yeghvard Motorsport Complex, Yeghvard

== Aruba ==
- Palo Marga International Raceway, Savaneta

== Australia ==
=== Map of Circuits ===
https://www.google.com/maps/d/edit?mid=1W-j1m_xKC9ihwqaQMMoTvyBDKpltVSk&usp=sharing

=== Permanent circuits ===
- Albany Motorsports Park, Albany, Western Australia
- Baskerville Raceway, Hobart, Tasmania
- Broadford Track, Victoria
- Calder Park Raceway, Melbourne, Victoria
- Carnell Raceway, Stanthorpe, Queensland
- Circuit Italia, Balickera, New South Wales
- Collie Motorplex, Collie, Western Australia
- DriveIt NQ, Calcium, Queensland
- Hidden Valley Raceway, Darwin, Northern Territory
- Lakeside International Raceway, Brisbane, Queensland
- Luddenham Raceway, Luddenham, New South Wales
- Mallala Motor Sport Park, Mallala, South Australia
- McNamara Park, Mount Gambier, South Australia
- Morgan Park Raceway, Warwick, Queensland
- One Raceway, Goulburn, New South Wales (formerly known as Wakefield Park Raceway)
- Pheasant Wood Circuit, Marulan, New South Wales

†	MotoGP GP Venue	Phillip Island Grand Prix Circuit, Cowes, Victoria

- Queensland Raceway, Ipswich, Queensland
- Sandown Raceway, Melbourne, Victoria

†	MotoGP GP Venue	Sydney Motorsport Park, Eastern Creek, New South Wales	formerly known as Eastern Creek Raceway

- Symmons Plains Raceway, Launceston, Tasmania
- The Bend Motorsport Park, Tailem Bend, South Australia
- Wanneroo Raceway, Perth, Western Australia
- Winton Motor Raceway, Benalla, Victoria
- Wodonga TAFE Driver Training Complex, Wodonga, Victoria

==== Defunct ====
- Adelaide International Raceway, Adelaide, South Australia (still has limited use)
- Amaroo Park, Sydney, New South Wales
- Aspendale Racecourse, Aspendale, Victoria
- Catalina Park, Katoomba, New South Wales
- Hume Weir Motor Racing Circuit, Albury-Wodonga, New South Wales
- Oran Park Raceway, Sydney, New South Wales
- Port Wakefield Circuit, Port Wakefield, South Australia
- Surfers Paradise International Raceway, Gold Coast, Queensland
- Warwick Farm Raceway, Sydney, New South Wales

=== Temporary circuits ===
†	Formula One GP Venue	Adelaide Street Circuit, Adelaide, South Australia

†	Formula One GP Venue	Albert Park Circuit, Melbourne, Victoria

- Mount Panorama Circuit, Bathurst, New South Wales
- Perth Park, Perth, Western Australia
- Reid Park Street Circuit, Townsville, Queensland
- Surfers Paradise Street Circuit, Surfers Paradise, Queensland

==== Defunct ====
- Applecross Street Circuit, Perth, Western Australia
- Ballarat Airport, Ballarat, Victoria
- Canberra Street Circuit, Canberra, Australian Capital Territory
- Caversham Airfield Circuit, Caversham, Western Australia
- Gawler Airfield Circuit, Gawler, South Australia
- Gnoo Blas Motor Racing Circuit, Orange, New South Wales
- Hartley Vale Road Circuit, Hartley Vale, New South Wales
- Homebush Street Circuit, Sydney Olympic Park, New South Wales
- Leyburn Airfield Circuit, Leyburn, Queensland
- Lobethal Circuit, Lobethal, South Australia
- Longford Circuit, Longford, Tasmania
- Lowood Airfield Circuit, Tarampa, Queensland
- Macarthur Park Street Circuit, Australian Capital Territory
- Mildura TT Circuit, Mildura, Victoria
- Newcastle Street Circuit, Newcastle, New South Wales
- Narrogin Street Circuit, Narrogin, Western Australia
- Nuriootpa Street Circuit, Nuriootpa, South Australia
- Point Cook Airfield, Point Cook, Victoria
- Parramatta Raceway, Parramatta, New South Wales
- Port Elliot-Victor Harbor Circuit, Victor Harbor, South Australia
- Southport Street Circuit, Southport, Queensland
- Tunbridge Airfield, Tunbridge, Tasmania
- Vale Circuit, Bathurst, New South Wales
- Valley Field Airport, Epping Forest, Tasmania
- Woodside Circuit, Woodside, South Australia

=== Speedways ===
- Arunga Park Speedway, Alice Springs, Northern Territory
- Avalon Raceway, Avalon, Victoria
- Borderline Speedway, Mount Gambier, South Australia
- Brisbane Exhibition Ground, Brisbane, Queensland
- Bunbury City Speedway, Bunbury, Western Australia
- Charlton Raceway, Toowoomba, Queensland
- Dubbo Speedway, Dubbo, New South Wales
- Ellenbrook Speedway, Bullsbrook, Western Australia
- Gilgandra Speedway, Gilgandra, New South Wales
- Gillman Speedway, Adelaide, South Australia
- Gympie Speedway, Gympie, Queensland
- Hobart International Speedway, New Norfolk, Tasmania
- Kalgoorlie International Speedway, Kalgoorlie, Western Australia
- Northline Speedway, Darwin, Northern Territory
- Olympic Park Speedway, Mildura, Victoria
- Perth Motorplex, Kwinana Beach, Western Australia
- Pioneer Park Speedway, Brandon, Queensland
- Premier Speedway, Warrnambool, Victoria
- Riverview Speedway, Murray Bridge, South Australia
- Rockhampton Speedway, Rockhampton, Queensland
- Sapphire Speedway, Bega, New South Wales
- Sydney Speedway, Sydney, New South Wales
- Townsville Motorcycle Club, Woodstock, Queensland
- Western Speedway, Hamilton, Victoria

==== Defunct ====
- Archerfield Speedway, Brisbane, Queensland
- Brenock Park Speedway, Ferntree Gully, Victoria
- Claremont Speedway, Perth, Western Australia
- Liverpool Speedway, Sydney, New South Wales
- Penguin Speedway, Penguin, Tasmania
- Rowley Park Speedway, Adelaide, South Australia
- Speedway City, Adelaide, South Australia
- Sydney Showground Speedway, Sydney, New South Wales
- Tralee Speedway, Queanbeyan, New South Wales

=== Drag strips ===
- Adelaide International Raceway, Adelaide, South Australia
- Alice Springs Inland Dragway, Alice Springs, Northern Territory
- Bairnsdale Dragway, Bairnsdale, Victoria
- Benaraby Raceway, Gladstone, Queensland
- Calder Park Raceway, Melbourne, Victoria
- Collie Motorplex, Collie, Western Australia
- Coonawarra Dragway, Coonawarra, South Australia
- Corinda Race Track, Charters Towers, Queensland
- Heathcote Park Raceway, Heathcote, Victoria
- Hidden Valley Raceway, Darwin, Northern Territory
- Ironbark Raceway, Roma, Queensland
- Mildura Sunset Strip, Mildura, Victoria
- Palmyra Dragway, Mackay, Queensland
- Perth Motorplex, Kwinana Beach, Western Australia
- South Coast Raceway, Portland, Victoria
- Springmount Raceway, Mareeba, Queensland
- Steel City Raceway, Whyalla, South Australia
- Tarmak Dragway, Launceston, Tasmania
- Warwick Dragway, Warwick, Queensland
- Western Sydney International Dragway, Sydney, New South Wales
- Wilby Park Raceway, Wilby, Victoria
- Willowbank Raceway, Ipswich, Queensland

==== Defunct ====
- Canberra International Dragway, Fairbairn, Australian Capital Territory
- Castlereagh International Dragway, Sydney, New South Wales
- Townsville Dragway, Townsville, Queensland

=== Hillclimbs ===
- Collingrove Hillclimb, Angaston, South Australia
- Haunted Hills Racetrack, Gippsland, Victoria
- Mount Buller, Victoria
- Mount Cotton Hillclimb, Mount Cotton, Queensland
- Mount Majura Hillclimb, Mount Majura, Australian Capital Territory
- Mount Tarrengower, Maldon, Victoria
- Rob Roy, Christmas Hills, Victoria
- Highclere Hillclimb, Highclere, Tasmania
- Lake Barrington Hillclimb, Lake Barrington, Tasmania
- Trowutta Hillclimb, Trowutta, Tasmania
- Domain Hillclimb, Queens Domain, Tasmania
- Lufra Hillclimb, Eaglehawk Neck, Tasmania
- Jack's Hill, Neerabup, Western Australia

==== Defunct ====
- King Edward Park Hillclimb, Newcastle, New South Wales
- Templestowe Hillclimb, Melbourne, Victoria

== Austria ==
=== Permanent circuits ===
- Nordring, Altenburg
- PS Racing Center Greinbach, Greinbach

†	MotoGP GP Venue	Salzburgring, Salzburg

†	Formula One GP Venue; MotoGP GP Venue	Red Bull Ring, Spielberg	Formerly called Österreichring

- Wachauring, Melk
- WRT Ring Hollabrunn, Hollabrunn

=== Temporary circuits ===
- Ennstalring, Großraming (still used for classic motorcycle races)
- Schwanenstadt-Pitzenberg, Schwanenstadt

==== Defunct ====
- Aspern Airfield, Vienna
- Linz-Hörsching Airport, Hörsching
- Racetrack Innsbruck-Kranebitten, Innsbruck
- St. Pölten Street Race, Sankt Pölten
- Stadtkurs Baden bei Wien, Baden bei Wien
- Tulln-Langenlebarn Airfield Circuit, Tulln
- Traiskirchen Street Race, Traiskirchen

†	Formula One GP Venue	Zeltweg Airfield, Zeltweg

=== Hillclimb venues ===
- Rechbergrennen (near Graz)
- Bergrennen Landshaag–St. Martin
- Bergrennen Oberhallau
- Internationales Auto-Bergrennen from Esthofen to St. Agatha

=== Defunct ===
- Exelbergrennen (near Vienna)
- Gaisbergrennen (near Salzburg)
- Großglockner Hochalpenstraße
- Hungerburg-Bergrennen (near Innsbruck)
- Semmering-Bergrennen
- Zirler-Bergrennen
- St. Urban – Simonhöhe
- St. Andrä – Kitzeck
- Gasen – Strassegg
- Altlengbach
- St. Anton an der Jessnitz
- Mühlbach am Hochkönig
- Tauplitzalm Bergpreis
- Bergpreis Göstling - Hochkar
- Loser Bergtrophy

== Azerbaijan ==
†	Formula One GP Venue	Baku City Circuit, Baku

=== Defunct ===
- Baku World Challenge, Baku

== The Bahamas ==
=== Defunct ===
- Grand Bahama Vintage Grand Prix Circuit, Freeport
- Nassau Arawak Cay, Nassau
- Nassau Oakes Field, Nassau
- Nassau Windsor Field, Nassau

== Bahrain ==
†	Formula One GP Venue	Bahrain International Circuit, Sakhir

== Barbados ==
- Bushy Park Circuit, Gaskin, St. Philip

== Belarus ==
- RSTTS Dosaaf (URacing), Minsk

=== Defunct ===
- Borovaya Circuit, Minsk

== Belgium ==
=== Permanent circuits ===
†	Formula One GP Venue; MotoGP GP Venue	Circuit de Spa-Francorchamps, Spa (became permanent facility in 2000)

- Circuit Jules Tacheny Mettet, Mettet

†	Formula One GP Venue; MotoGP GP Venue	Circuit Zolder, Heusden-Zolder

==== Defunct ====
†	Formula One GP Venue	Nivelles-Baulers, Nivelles

- Warneton Speedway, Comines-Warneton

=== Temporary circuits ===
- Circuit de Chimay, Chimay

==== Defunct ====
- Ciney Street Circuit, Ciney
- Circuit Bois de la Cambre, Brussels
- Circuit du Bois de Loë
- Circuit du Canal Albert à Lixhe
- Circuit Coteaux, Hainaut
- Circuit de Val Dieu à Charneux
- Circuit de Floreffe, Floreffe
- Circuit de Gedinne, Dinant
- Circuit de Haccourt
- Circuit du Heysel, Brussels
- Circuit de Jéhonville, Bertrix
- Circuit de l'Avenue de l'Indépendance, Liège
- Circuit de Warsage, Warsage
- Circuit de Winnerotte, Warsage
- Circuit van Antwerpen Linkeroever, Antwerp
- Erpe-Mere, East Flanders
- Mettet Street Circuit, Mettet
- Oostende Noordzee Omloop, West Flanders
- Vliegbasis Koksijde, West Flanders

=== Rallycross circuits ===
- Duivelsbergcircuit, Maasmechelen Very known in the world of rallycross.
- Glosso Circuit, Arendonk

== Bermuda ==
- Bermuda Motorsports Park, St. David's Island

== Bolivia ==
- Circuito de Pucarani, Pucarani, La Paz Department

== Bosnia and Herzegovina ==
- Zalužani Circuit, Zalužani

=== Hillclimb venues ===
- Krajiška Zmija

== Brazil ==
=== Permanent circuits ===
- Autódromo Brasília BRB, Brasília, Distrito Federal (Brazil)
- Autódromo Capuava, Indaiatuba, São Paulo
- Autódromo Dimas de Mello Pimenta, Itatinga, São Paulo

†	MotoGP GP Venue	Autódromo Internacional Ayrton Senna (Goiânia), Goiânia

- Autódromo Internacional Ayrton Senna (Londrina), Londrina, Paraná
- Autódromo Internacional da Paraíba, São Miguel do Taipu, Paraíba
- Autódromo Internacional de Campo Grande, Campo Grande, Mato Grosso do Sul
- Autódromo Internacional de Cascavel (Autódromo Zilmar Beux), Cascavel, Paraná
- Autódromo Internacional de Chapecó, Chapecó, Santa Catarina
- Autódromo Internacional de Guaporé (Autódromo Nelson Luiz Barro), Guaporé, Rio Grande do Sul
- Autódromo Internacional de Mato Grosso, Cuiabá, Mato Grosso
- Autódromo Internacional de Santa Cruz do Sul, Santa Cruz do Sul, Rio Grande do Sul
- Autódromo Internacional de Tarumã, Viamão, Rio Grande do Sul
- Autódromo Internacional Potenza, Lima Duarte, Minas Gerais
- Autódromo Internacional Virgílio Távora, Eusébio, Ceará

†	Formula One GP Venue; MotoGP GP Venue	Autódromo José Carlos Pace (Interlagos), São Paulo, São Paulo

- Autódromo Velo Città, Mogi Guaçu, São Paulo
- Circuito dos Cristais, Curvelo, Minas Gerais
- Circuito Panamericano, Elias Fausto, São Paulo
- Esporte Piracicabano Automobilismo Club (ECPA), Piracicaba, São Paulo
- Mega Space, Santa Luzia, São Paulo
- Motor Park Haras Tuiuti, Tuiuti, São Paulo
- Plan Speed Park, Campos dos Goytacazes, Rio de Janeiro
- Speed Park Franca, Franca, São Paulo
- Velopark, Nova Santa Rita, Rio Grande do Sul

==== Defunct ====
- Autódromo de Valinhos, Valinhos, São Paulo
- Autódromo Geraldo Backer, Serra, Espírito Santo
- Autódromo Internacional Ayrton Senna (Caruaru), Caruaru, Pernambuco
- Autódromo Internacional de Curitiba (Circuito Raul Boesel), Pinhais, Paraná

†	Formula One GP Venue; MotoGP GP Venue	Autódromo Internacional Nelson Piquet (Jacarepaguá, Rio de Janeiro), Rio de Janeiro

- Autódromo Nacional de Adrianópolis, Nova Iguaçu

=== Temporary circuits ===
- Circuito Toninho da Matta, Belo Horizonte, Minas Gerais
- São Paulo Street Circuit, São Paulo, São Paulo

==== Defunct ====
- Cacá Bueno Circuit, Rio de Janeiro
- Cidade Baixa de Salvador, Salvador, Bahia
- Circuito Automobilístico de Piracicaba, Piracicaba, São Paulo
- Circuito Ayrton Senna, Salvador, Bahia
- Circuito da Avenida do Centenário, Salvador, Bahia
- Circuito da Cidade Universitária da UFPE, Recife, Pernambuco
- Circuito da Gávea, Rio de Janeiro
- Circuito da Pedra Redonda, Porto Alegre, Rio Grande do Sul
- Circuito da Rua do Farol da Barra, Salvador, Bahia
- Circuito da Via Expressa Sul, Florianópolis
- Circuito de Itapecerica, Itapecerica, Minas Gerais
- Circuito de Rua da Barra da Tijuca, Rio de Janeiro
- Circuito de Rua de Araraquara, Araraquara, São Paulo
- Circuito de Rua de Blumenau, Blumenau
- Circuito de Rua de Conceição da Barra, Conceição da Barra
- Circuito de Rua de Coqueiral de Itaparica, Vila Velha, Espírito Santo
- Circuito de Rua de Petrópolis, Petrópolis, Rio de Janeiro
- Circuito de Rua do Jardim América, Jardins, São Paulo
- Circuito do Mineirão, Belo Horizonte, Minas Gerais
- Circuito dos 1000 km de Brasilia, Brasília, Distrito Federal (Brazil)
- Enseada do Suá, Vitória, Espírito Santo
- Ilha do Fundão, Governador Island, Rio de Janeiro
- Ribeirão Preto Street Circuit, Ribeirão Preto

== Bulgaria ==
=== Permanent circuits ===
- A1 Motor Park, Samokov
- Drakon Race Track, Kaloyanovo, Plovdiv Province
- Letishte Dolna Mitropoliya, Pleven

=== Temporary circuits ===
==== Defunct ====
- Albena Street Circuit, Albena
- Burgas Circuit, Burgas
- Industrial Park Haskovo, Haskovo
- Ruse Circuit, Ruse
- Sofia Circuit, Sofia
- Varna Circuit, Varna
- Veliko Tarnovo Circuit, Veliko Tarnovo

== Cambodia ==
- Yamamoto Circuit Cambodia, Phumĭ Snhák, Kampong Speu

== Cameroon ==
- Stade Olembe, Yaoundé
- Japoma Circuit, Douala
- Bonamoussadi Circuit, Douala

== Canada ==
=== Permanent circuits ===
- Area 27 Motorsports Park, Oliver, British Columbia
- Atlantic Motorsport Park, Shubenacadie, Nova Scotia
- Calabogie Motorsports Park, Calabogie, Ontario

†	Formula One GP Venue; MotoGP GP Venue	Canadian Tire Motorsport Park, Clarington, Ontario also known as Mosport Park

- Circuit ICAR, Mirabel, Quebec

†	Formula One GP Venue	Circuit Mont-Tremblant, Mont-Tremblant, Quebec

- Gimli Motorsports Park, Gimli, Manitoba
- Mission Raceway Park, Mission, British Columbia
- Rocky Mountain Motorsports Race Circuit, Carstairs, Alberta
- Shannonville Motorsport Park, Belleville, Ontario
- Stratotech Park Raceway, Sturgeon County, Alberta
- Toronto Motorsports Park, Cayuga, Ontario
- Vancouver Island Motorsport Circuit, Duncan, British Columbia

==== Defunct ====
- Autodrome Saint-Eustache, Saint-Eustache, Quebec
- Edenvale Raceway, Clearview, Ontario
- Edmonton International Speedway, Edmonton, Alberta
- Harewood Acres, Nanticoke, Ontario
- Race City Motorsport Park, Calgary, Alberta
- Westwood Motorsport Park, Coquitlam, British Columbia

=== Temporary circuits ===
†	Formula One GP Venue	Circuit Gilles Villeneuve, Île Notre-Dame, Montreal

- Circuit Trois-Rivières, Trois-Rivières, Quebec
- Markham Street Circuit, Markham, Ontario

==== Defunct ====
- Edmonton Indy, Edmonton, Alberta
- Grand Prix de Granby, Granby, Quebec
- Grand Prix de Quebec, Quebec City, Quebec
- Halifax Citadel Hill, Halifax, Nova Scotia
- Molson Indy Vancouver, Vancouver, British Columbia
- Montreal Street Circuit, Montreal, Quebec
- Race Hamilton, Hamilton, Ontario
- Toronto Street Circuit, Toronto, Ontario

=== Paved ovals ===
- Autodrome Chaudière, Vallée-Jonction, Quebec
- Autodrome Montmagny, Montmagny, Quebec
- Central Alberta Raceways, Rimbey, Alberta
- Circuit Riverside Speedway Ste-Croix, Sainte-Croix, Quebec
- Delaware Speedway, Delaware, Ontario
- Dinosaur Downs Speedway, Drumheller, Alberta
- Edmonton International Raceway, Wetaskiwin, Alberta
- Flamboro Speedway, Hamilton, Ontario, Ontario
- Full Throttle Motor Speedway, Varney, Ontario
- Grand Bend Motorplex, Grand Bend, Ontario
- Hythe Motor Speedway, Hythe, Alberta
- ICAR Speedway, Mirabel, Quebec
- Kawartha Speedway, Fraserville, Ontario
- Kings Park Speedway, Regina, Saskatchewan
- Laird International Raceway, Laird, Ontario
- Medicine Hat Speedway, Medicine Hat, Alberta
- Oyster Bed Raceway, Oyster Bed Bridge, Prince Edward Island
- Peterborough Speedway, Cavan Monaghan, Ontario
- Petty International Raceway, River Glade, New Brunswick
- RAD Torque Raceway, Edmonton, Alberta
- Riverside International Speedway, Antigonish, Nova Scotia
- Sanair Super Speedway, Saint-Pie, Quebec
- Saratoga Speedway, Comox Valley, British Columbia
- Sauble Speedway, Hepworth, Ontario
- Scotia Speedworld, Enfield, Nova Scotia
- Shediac Centre for Speed, Shediac, New Brunswick
- Speedway 660, Fredericton, New Brunswick
- Speedway Miramichi, Miramichi, New Brunswick
- Sunset Speedway, Innisfil, Ontario
- Sutherland Automotive Speedway, Saskatoon, Saskatchewan
- Thunder Valley Speedway, Bishop's Falls, Newfoundland
- Victory Lane Speedway, St. Adolphe, Manitoba
- Yellowhead International Speedway, Hinton, Alberta

==== Defunct ====
- Autodrome Saguenay Speedway, Chicoutimi, Quebec
- Autodrome Saint-Eustache, Saint-Eustache, Quebec
- Barrie Speedway, Oro-Medonte, Ontario
- Bridge County Raceway, Lethbridge, Alberta
- Capital City Speedway, Ashton, Ontario
- Checker Flag Speedway, Windsor, Ontario
- Danny's Speedbowl, Beresford, New Brunswick
- Eastbound International Speedway, Avondale, Newfoundland and Labrador
- Exhibition Stadium, Toronto, Ontario
- Halifax-Dartmouth International Speedway, Upper Sackville, Nova Scotia
- Jukasa Motor Speedway, Cayuga, Ontario
- Langley Speedway, Langley, British Columbia
- Mosport Speedway, Bowmanville, Ontario
- Motoplex Speedway, Vernon, British Columbia
- North Bay (Sunnydale) Speedway, North Bay, Ontario
- Pinecrest Speedway, Concord, Ontario
- Race City Motorsport Park, Calgary, Alberta
- Rocky Mountain Raceway, Okotoks, Alberta
- Sangudo Speedway, Sangudo, Alberta
- Western Speedway, Victoria, British Columbia

=== Drag strips ===
- Saskatchewan International Raceway (SIR), Saskatoon, Saskatchewan (drag racing)
- Mission Raceway Park, Mission, British Columbia (drag racing)
- Nl'akapxm Eagle Motorplex, Ashcroft, British Columbia (drag racing)

== Cayman Islands ==
=== Drag Strips ===
==== Defunct ====
- Breakers Speedway, Bodden Town

== Chile ==
=== Permanent circuits ===
- Autódromo Bernardo O`Higgins, Alto Hospicio
- Autódromo Cabo Negro, Punta Arenas
- Autódromo de Cabrero, Cabrero
- Autódromo Gustavo Felo Rivera, Quilpué
- Autódromo Interlomas, Temuco
- Autódromo Internacional de Codegua, Rancagua
- Autódromo Juvenal Jeraldo, La Serena
- Autódromo Las Vizcachas, Puente Alto
- Autódromo San Antonio, San Antonio
- Autódromo Sergio Santander Benavente, Arica
- Autódromo Vegas de Quilaco, La Unión

==== Defunct ====
- Autodromo Chanida, Antofagasta
- Autodromo Chinquihue, Puerto Montt
- Autodromo Fernado Vallejos, Placilla
- Autodromo Frutillar Alto, Frutillar
- Autodromo Gultro, Rancagua
- Autodromo La Portada, Antofagasta
- Autodromo Piedra Roja, Antofagasta
- Autodromo Peñuelas, Peñuelas
- Autodromo Rancagua, Rancagua
- Autodromo Rocas de Santo Domingo, Santo Domingo
- Autodromo San Carlos de Apoquindo, Santiago

=== Temporary circuits ===
- Circuito Costanera San Martín, Arica
- Circuito Dorotea, Puerto Natales
- Circuito Paque Pedro de Valdivia, La Serena
- Circuito Plaza de Armas, Rengo
- Circuito Sausalito, Viña del Mar

==== Defunct ====
- Base Aérea de El Bosque, Santiago
- Base Aérea de Quintero, Quintero
- Base Aeronaval de El Belloto, Quilpué
- Circuito Mersan, Santiago
- Parque O'Higgins Circuit, Santiago
- Santiago Street Circuit, Santiago

=== Permanent kart tracks ===
- Kartodromo Angel Navarrete, Limache
- Kartodromo La Reina, Santiago
- Kartodromo Las Carretas, Lampa
- Kartodromo Mediocampo, Hualpen
- Kartodromo Siete Puentes, Rancagua

=== Permanent dirt circuits ===
- Autodromo Angol, Angol
- Autodromo Bajo Pinar, Temuco
- Autodromo Bajos de Pindapulli, Dalcahue
- Autodromo Cancura, Cancura
- Autodromo Cartagena, Cartagena
- Autodromo Cucao, Cucao
- Autodromo Curacavi, Curacavi
- Autodromo El Tabo, El Tabo
- Autodromo Estacion Paipote, Copiapo
- Autodromo La Encina, La Encina
- Autodromo La Ligua, La Ligua
- Autodromo Lago Rapel, Lago Rapel
- Autodromo Lanco, Lanco
- Autodromo Las Coimas, San Felipe
- Autodromo Las Quilas de Mocopulli, Dalcahue
- Autodromo Linares, Linares
- Autodromo Llau-Llau, Villarica
- Autodromo Lorenzo Varoli, Talca
- Autodromo Los Boldales, Los Angeles
- Autodromo Los Maitenes, Chillan Viejo
- Autodromo Los Pellines, Llanquihue
- Autodromo Los Pumas, Arauco
- Autodromo Malalhue, Malalhue
- Autodromo Malloa, Malloa
- Autodromo Marañon, Vallenar
- Autodromo Miramar (Cosmito), Penco
- Autodromo Municipal, Yumbel
- Autodromo Oasis, Antofagasta
- Autodromo Oreste Bonicioli, Puerto Natales
- Autodromo Padre de las Casas, Temuco
- Autodromo Parcela Municipal Marcelo Fourcade, Loncoche
- Autodromo Pocuro, Los Andes
- Autodromo Puerto Varas, Puerto Varas
- Autodromo Punahuel, Dalcahue
- Autodromo Rene Schenider, Porvenir
- Autodromo Rio Negro, Rio Negro
- Autodromo Salamanca, Salamanca
- Autodromo San Jose, Traiguen
- Autodromo San Juan, Ancud
- Autodromo San Pedro de la Paz, San Pedro de la Paz
- Autodromo Teno, Teno
- Autodromo Topater, Calama
- Autodromo Tronadores, Huillinco
- Autodromo Valdivia de Paine, Buin
- Autodromo Valentin del Barrio, Rengo
- Autodromo Villa Olimpica, Olmue
- Autodromo Villarica, Villarica

== China ==
=== Permanent circuits ===
- Chengdu Tianfu International Circuit, Tianfu New Area
- Daqing Racing Town, Daqing
- Goldenport Park Circuit, Beijing
- Guangdong International Circuit, Zhaoqing
- Guizhou Junchi International Circuit, Guizhou
- Jiangsu Wantrack International Circuit, Nanjing
- Ningbo International Circuit, Beilun
- Ordos International Circuit, Ordos City
- Pinggu Haigu Car Park, Pinggu
- Shandong Weifang International Circuit, Weifang

†	Formula One GP Venue; MotoGP GP Venue	Shanghai International Circuit, Shanghai

- Shanghai Tianma Circuit, Shanghai
- Shougang Motorsport Valley, Qinhuangdao
- V1 Auto World Tianjin, Tianjin
- Xi'an Automobile University Track, Xi'an
- Xiamen International Circuit, Xiamen
- Zhejiang International Circuit, Shaoxing
- Zhengzhou International Autodrome, Zhengzhou
- Zhuhai International Circuit, Zhuhai
- Zhuzhou International Circuit, Zhuzhou

==== Defunct ====
- Chengdu Goldenport Circuit, Chengdu

=== Temporary circuits ===
- Beijing Street Circuit, Beijing
- Sanya Street Circuit, Sanya
- Pingtan Ruyi Lake International City Circuit, Pingtan Island

==== Defunct ====
- Beijing International Street Circuit, Beijing
- Beijing Olympic Green Circuit, Beijing
- Jingkai Street Circuit, Beijing
- Qingdao Street Circuit, Qingdao
- Shanghai Street Circuit, Shanghai
- Wuhan Street Circuit, Wuhan
- Yancheng Street Circuit, Yancheng
- Zhuhai Street Circuit, Zhuhai

== Colombia ==
- Autódromo Central Park, Bello, Antioquia
- Autódromo de Tocancipá, Tocancipá, Cundinamarca

=== Defunct ===
- Autódromo Ricardo Mejía, Bogotá

== Costa Rica ==
- Autódromo La Guácima, Guácima

== Croatia ==
=== Permanent circuits ===
- Automotodrom Glavica, Požega

†	MotoGP GP Venue	Automotodrom Grobnik, Rijeka

=== Temporary circuits ===
==== Defunct ====
- Circuit Podi (Dugopolje), Dugopolje

†	MotoGP GP Venue	Opatija Circuit, Opatija

- Poreč Street Circuit, Poreč
- Solin - Brižine, Solin

=== Hillclimb venues ===
- Buzetski Dani
- Nagrada Stubickih Toplica
- Nagrada Grada Skradina
- Cabar

== Cuba ==
=== Defunct ===
- Circuito del Malecón, Malecón, Havana

== Curaçao ==
=== Defunct ===
- Willemstad Street Circuit, Willemstad

== Cyprus ==
- Achna Speedway, Dasaki Achnas

== Czech Republic ==
=== Permanent circuits ===
- Autodrom Most, Most
- Autodrom Vysoké Mýto, Vysoké Mýto
- Autodrome Sosnová, Česká Lípa

†	MotoGP GP Venue	Automotodrom Brno (also known as Masaryk Circuit), Brno

- CzechRing, Hradec Králové

=== Temporary circuits ===
- Bezručův okruh Opava, Opava
- Circuit Hořice v Podkrkonoší, Hořice
- Okruh Františka Bartoše Ostrava, Ostrava
- Těrlicko Street Circuit, Těrlicko

==== Defunct ====
- Cena Prachovskych skal, Jičín
- Dymokury Okruh, Dymokury
- Havířov Street Circuit, Havířov
- Letiště Mnichovo Hradiště, Mnichovo Hradiště
- Masaryk Circuit, Brno
- Most Street Circuit, Most
- Rosiský Okruh, Rosice
- Štramberský Trojúhelník, Štramberk

=== Natural circuits ===
- Hořický okruh, Hořice
- Těrlický okruh, Těrlicko
- Okruh Františka Bartoše, Ostrava-Radvanice
- Kyjovský okruh, Kyjov

=== Defunct ===
- Krakonošův okruh, Stará Paka

=== Hillclimb circuits ===
- Ecce Homo, Šternberk
- Zámecký vrch, Náměšť nad Oslavou
- Ústecká 21, Ústí nad Orlicí

=== Dirt circuits ===
- Autodrom Sosnová, Sosnová
- Štikovská rokle, Nová Paka
- Sedlčanská kotlina, Sedlcany
- Závodiště Rachvala, Dolní Bousov
- Cross Arena Přerov, Přerov
- AMK Zálesí Humpolec, Humpolec
- Loketské serpentiny, Loket

=== Speedway circuits ===
- Březolupy Speedway, Březolupy
- Chabařovice Speedway, Chabařovice
- Liberec Speedway, Liberec
- Markéta Stadium, Břevnov
- Mšeno Speedway Stadium, Mšeno
- Plzeň speedway track, Plzeň
- Slaný Speedway Stadium, Slaný
- Svítkov Stadium, Pardubice

==== Defunct ====
- Mariánské Lázně Longtrack Speedway, Mariánské Lázně
- Trade Union Stadium, Ostrava

=== Permanent kart circuits ===
- Kart Arena Cheb, Cheb
- Autodrom Vysoke Myto, Vysoké Mýto
- Autodrom Hradiště, Písek

== Democratic Republic of the Congo ==
=== Defunct ===
- Grand Prix de Léopoldville, Léopoldville

== Denmark ==
=== Permanent circuits ===
- Jyllands-Ringen, Silkeborg
- Padborg Park, Padborg
- Ring Djursland, Nimtofte
- Sjællandsringen, Roskilde

==== Defunct ====
- Roskilde Ring, Roskilde

=== Rallycross circuits ===
- Nissenringen, Næstved
- Nysumbanen, Nysum
- Ørnedalsbanen, Sæby

=== Speedway circuits ===
- Billund Municipality Stadium, Grindsted
- Brovst Speedway Center, Brovst
- Fjelsted Speedway Stadium, Harndrup
- Fladbro Speedway, Randers
- Granly Speedway Arena, Esbjerg
- Holsted Speedway Center, Holsted
- Munkebo Speedway Center, Munkebo
- Outrup Speedway Center, Outrup
- Slangerup Speedway Center, Slangerup
- Vojens Speedway Center, Vojens

==== Defunct ====
- Fredericia Speedway Stadium, Fredericia
- Hillerød Stadium, Hillerød
- Næstved Stadium, Næstved

=== Temporary circuits ===
- Aarhus Street Circuit, Aarhus
- Copenhagen Street Circuit, Copenhagen
- Roskilde Street Circuit, Roskilde

== Dominican Republic ==
- Autodrómo Internacional de Las Américas, Santo Domingo

=== Defunct ===
- Autódromo La Cumbre, San Cristóbal

== Ecuador ==
- Autodromo Internacional de Yahuarcocha, Yahuarcocha
- Autódromo Teofilo Bucaram Saadi, La Libertad

== Egypt ==
=== Defunct ===
- El Gezira Park Track, Gezira, Cairo

== El Salvador ==
- Autódromo Internacional El Jabalí, La Libertad, El Salvador

== Eritrea ==
=== Defunct ===
- Circuit of Asmara, Asmara

== Estonia ==
=== Permanent circuits ===
- Porsche Ring, Pärnu

==== Defunct ====
- Linnaring, Tallinn
- Raadi Circuit, Kakumetsa

=== Temporary circuits ===
==== Defunct ====
- Iru-Lucati-Kloostrimetsa Circuit, Tallinn
- Oyakyula-Vanamõisa Circuit, Kakumetsa
- Pirita-Kose-Kloostrimetsa Circuit, Tallinn
- Vana-Võidu Ring, Viljandi

== Ethiopia ==
=== Defunct ===
- Addis Ababa City Circuit, Kebena, Addis Ababa
- Mekanisa Track, Mekanisa, Addis Ababa

== Finland ==
=== Permanent circuits ===
- Ahvenisto Race Circuit, Hämeenlinna
- Alastaro Circuit, Alastaro
- Botniaring Racing Circuit, Jurva
- Kemora Circuit, Veteli
- Kymi Ring, Kausala (Kouvola)
- Motopark Raceway, Pieksämäki
- OuluZone, Oulu
- Vantaa Circuit, Vantaa

==== Defunct ====
- Keimola Motor Stadium, Vantaa
- Kouvola Circuit, Kouvola

=== Temporary circuits ===
- Räyskälän lentokenttä, Räyskälä

==== Defunct ====
- Eläintarha, Helsinki, site of the Finnish Grand Prix
- Helsinki Thunder, Helsinki

†	MotoGP GP Venue	Imatra Circuit, Imatra

- Kalastajatorppa, Helsinki
- Munkkiniemenrata, Helsinki

†	MotoGP GP Venue	Tampere Circuit, Tampere

- Seinäjoen Katurata, Seinäjoki
- Veckjärvivägen, Porvoo

== France ==
=== Permanent circuits ===
- Anneau du Rhin, Biltzheim
- Autodrome de Linas-Montlhéry, Montlhéry

†	Formula One GP Venue; MotoGP GP Venue	Bugatti Circuit, Le Mans

- Circuit Carole, Tremblay-en-France
- Circuit d'Albi, Albi
- Circuit de Croix-en-Ternois, Croix-en-Ternois

†	Formula One GP Venue; MotoGP GP Venue	Circuit de Charade, Clermont-Ferrand

- Circuit de Chenevières, Chenevières
- Circuit de Faleyras, Faleyras
- Circuit de Haute Saintonge, La Genétouze
- Circuit de Lédenon, Lédenon
- Circuit de Lohéac, Lohéac
- Circuit de Loire-Atlantique, Fay-de-Bretagne
- Circuit Lurcy-Lévis, Lurcy-Lévis
- Circuit de Miramas, Miramas
- Circuit de Montpellier Goodyear Mireval, Mireval

†	Formula One GP Venue; MotoGP GP Venue	Circuit de Nevers Magny-Cours, Nevers

- Circuit du Bourbonnais, Montbeugny
- Circuit du Luc, Le Luc
- Circuit du Mas du Clos, Saint-Avit-de-Tardes
- Circuit du Mornay, Bonnat
- Circuit du Val de Vienne, Le Vigeant
- Circuit du Var Luc, Le Luc

†	MotoGP GP Venue	Circuit Nogaro, Nogaro	also known as Circuit Paul Armagnac

- Circuit Pau-Arnos, Pau

†	Formula One GP Venue; MotoGP GP Venue	Circuit Paul Ricard, Le Castellet

†	Formula One GP Venue	Dijon-Prenois, Dijon (see also Swiss Grand Prix)

- Pôle mécanique Alès-Cévennes, Saint-Martin-de-Valgalgues
- Stadium Automobile Abbeville, Abbeville

==== Defunct ====
- Circuit Auto-Moto de Bordeaux-Mérignac, Mérignac
- Circuit de l'Eure, Vernon
- Circuit de Lezennes, Lille
- Circuit de Miramas, Miramas
- Circuit du Val d'Or, Versailles

=== Temporary circuits ===
- Circuit de la Châtre, La Châtre
- Circuit de la Sarthe, Le Mans
- Circuit de Pau, Pau
- Grand Prix du Ried, Bœsenbiesen

==== Defunct ====
- Aéroport de Dijon-Bourgogne, Dijon
- Aérodrome de Nîmes-Courbessac, Nîmes
- Bois de Boulogne, Paris
- Circuit Avenue du Prado, Marseille
- Circuit Automobile et Motocycliste de Vitesse de Périgueux, Périgueux
- Circuit Bordeaux, Bordeaux
- Circuit d'Agen, Agen
- Circuit d'Obernai-Bernadswiller, Bernardswiller
- Circuit de Bagatelle, Bagatelle
- Circuit de Cadours, Cadours
- Circuit de la Garoupe, Antibes
- Circuit de la Touraine, Semblançay
- Circuit de Quincieux, Quincieux
- Circuit de Torvilliers, Torvilliers
- Circuit de Tours-Semblançay, Tours
- Circuit des Platanes, Perpignan
- Circuit des Remparts, Angoulême
- Circuit du Comminges, Saint-Gaudens
- Circuit Dieppe-Saint-Aubin, Dieppe
- Circuit du Lac, Aix-les-Bains

†	MotoGP GP Venue	Circuit Les Planques, Albi

- Circuit Nantes, Nantes
- Circuit Nice, Nice
- Circuit Nîmes, Nîmes
- Circuit Permanent de Vitesse de Vesoul, Quincey
- Circuit Péronne, Mesnil-Bruntel
- Circuit Perpignan, Perpignan
- Circuit Raymond Sommer, Albi
- Circuit Saint-Cloud, Saint-Cloud
- Circuit St. Just-Andrezieux, Saint-Just-Saint-Rambert
- Circuit Vichy, Vichy
- Marcq-en-Barœul, Marcq-en-Barœul
- Paris Street Circuit, Paris

†	Formula One GP Venue; MotoGP GP Venue	Reims-Gueux, Reims

†	Formula One GP Venue; MotoGP GP Venue	Rouen-Les-Essarts, Rouen

- Tours Speedway, Tours

=== Hillclimb venues ===
- Mont Ventoux Hill Climb
- Bagnols – Sabran
- St. Jean Du Gard – Col St. Pierre
- Abreschviller – St. Quirin
- Teurses Thereval – Agneaux
- La Pommeraye
- Saint Goueno
- Marchampt de Beaujolais
- Vuillafans – Echevannes
- Dunieres – Auvergne
- Mont Dore
- Turckheim
- Limonest – Mont Verdun
- Chamrousse
- Le Mont-Doré

=== Speedway circuits ===
- Circuit de la Grisière, Mâcon
- Marmande Speedway, Marmande

== Georgia ==
- Rustavi International Motorpark, Rustavi

== Germany ==
=== Permanent circuits ===
- Bilster Berg, Bad Driburg
- Heidbergring, Geesthacht
- Lausitzring, Klettwitz

†	Formula One GP Venue; MotoGP GP Venue	Hockenheimring, Hockenheim

- Motorsport Arena Oschersleben, Oschersleben

†	Formula One GP Venue; MotoGP GP Venue	Nürburgring, Nürburg

- Racepark Meppen, Meppen

†	MotoGP GP Venue	Sachsenring, Hohenstein-Ernstthal

==== Defunct ====
- Südschleife, Nürburg
- Opel-Rennbahn, Rüsselsheim am Main

=== Autocross & Rallycross circuits ===
- Motorsport-Rennstrecke Auf den Seelower Höhen, Seelow
- Daubornring, Hünfelden-Dauborn
- Estering, Buxtehude - used in the FIA World Rallycross Championship from 2014 to 2018
- Ewald-Pauli-Ring, Schlüchtern
- Gründautalring Gründau

=== Temporary circuits ===
- Frohburger Dreieck, Frohburg
- Norisring, Nuremberg
- Oberlausitzer Dreieck
- Schleizer Dreieck, Schleiz
- Tempelhof Airport Street Circuit, Berlin
- Unstrutring, Nottertal-Heilinger Höhen
- Puschwitzer Dreieck, Neschwitz
- Weidaer Dreieck, Riesa
- Zschorlauer Dreieck, Zschorlau

=== Motocross circuits ===
- Motocross- und Offroadpark Dieskau, Kabelsketal-Dieskau
- Motocross-Strecke Lausitzring Sonnenhäusel, Klettwitz
- Talkessel Teutschenthal, Teutschenthal
- Teterower Bergring, Teterow

=== Speedway circuits ===
- Anton Treffer Stadion, Neustadt an der Donau
- Berghaupten Speedway, Berghaupten
- Bergring Arena, Teterow
- Eichenring, Scheeßel
- Ellermühle Speedway Stadium, Landshut
- Güstrow Speedway Stadium, Güstrow
- Holsteinring, Brokstedt
- Ludwigslust Motodrom, Ludwigslust
- Mecklenburgring, Parchim
- Meissen Speedway Stadium, Meissen
- Motodrom am Cottaweg, Leipzig
- Motodrom Halbemond, Halbemond
- Neuenknick Speedway, Petershagen
- Olching Speedwaybahn, Olching
- Paul Greifzu Stadium (Stralsund), Stralsund
- Reiterwaldstadion, Vechta
- Rennbahnstadion Mühldorf, Mühldorf
- Rhein-Main Arena, Hofheim
- Rottalstadion, Pocking
- Sandbahn Rennen Herxheim, Herxheim bei Landau/Pfalz
- Wack Hofmeister Stadium, Abensberg

==== Defunct ====
- Breitenthal Speedway Stadium, Breitenthal
- Glück-Auf Stadium, Senftenberg
- Grümmi-Arena, Neumünster
- Günter Harder Stadion, Neubrandenburg
- Hansa Stadium, Bremen
- Illerstadion, Kempten
- Niederrheinstadion, Oberhausen
- Rodenbach Motodrom, Rodenbach
- Rostock Speedway, Rostock
- Ruhpolding Speedway, Ruhpolding
- Speedway Stadion Pfaffenhofen, Pfaffenhofen an der Ilm

=== Supermoto circuits ===
- Wendelinuspark-Rennstrecke, St. Wendel

=== Training Center & Traffic Practice with Motorsport Events ===
- Spreewaldring Training Center, Schönwald
- Travering, Bad Oldesloe

==== Defunct ====
- Aachener-Wald-Rennen, Aachen
- Alemannenring, Singen
- Autobahnschere Chemnitz, Chemnitz
- Autobahnspinne Dresden, Dresden

†	Formula One GP Venue	AVUS, Berlin

- Badberg-Vierecksrennen
- Battenbergring, Battenberg
- Bautzener Autobahnring, Bautzen
- Berlin Street Circuit, Berlin
- Bernauer Schleife, Bernau bei Berlin
- Buckower Dreieck, Buckow
- Burgringrennen, Monschau
- Colditzer Waldbadrennen, Colditz
- Deutschlandring, Hohnstein
- Dieburger Dreiecksrennen, Dieburg
- Diepholz Airfield Circuit, Diepholz
- Donauring, Ingolstadt
- Eilenriede-Rennen, Hannover
- Erding Air Base, Erding
- Feldberg-Rundrennstrecke, Oberreifenberg
- Fliegerhorst Erding, Erding
- Fliegerhorst Kaufbeuren, Kaufbeuren
- Flugplatz Achum, Bückeburg
- Flugplatz Ahlhorn, Großenkneten
- Flugplatz Alt Daber, Wittstock
- Flugplatz Bremgarten, Eschbach
- Flughafen Heringsdorf, Zirchow
- Flughafen Kassel-Calden, Kassel
- Freiberger Dreieck, Freiberg
- Grenzlandring, Wegberg
- Grillenburger Dreieck, Grillenburg
- Halle-Saale-Schleife, Halle (Saale)
- Hanseatenring Wismar, Wismar
- Hofer Dreiecksrennen Hof (Saale)
- Donauring, Ingolstadt
- Karlsruher Dreiecksrennen, Karlsruhe
- Kassel Calden Circuit, Calden
- Königsbrücker Rundstreckenrennen, Königsbrück
- Leipziger Stadtparkrennen, Leipzig
- Mainz-Finthen Circuit, Mainz
- Marienberger Dreieck, Marienberg
- Moritzburger Dreieck Moritzburg
- Motodrom Gelsenkirchen, Gelsenkirchen
- Odenwaldring, Buchen (Odenwald)
- Plauener Friedensring, Plauen
- Rennstrecke Dessau, Dessau
- Rennstrecke Eisweiler, Eisweiler
- Rennstrecke Essen, Essen
- Rennstrecke Malente, Malente

†	MotoGP GP Venue	Schottenring, Schotten

†	MotoGP GP Venue	Solitudering, Stuttgart

- Regio-Ring, Lahr
- Rostocker Osthafenkurs, Rostock
- Siegerlandring, Siegerland
- Stadtkurs St. Wendel, St. Wendel
- Waldparkring Mingolsheim, Mingolsheim
- Wittenberger Rundstrecken-Rennen, Wittenberg
- Wunstorf Air Base Circuit, Wunstorf
- Zweibrücken Circuit, Zweibrücken

=== Hillclimb venues ===
- Glasbachrennen, Bad Liebenstein
- Bergrennen Eichenbühl, Eichenbühl
- Ibergrennen, Iberg (Harz)
- Hauenstein Bergrennen, Hausen (Rhön)
- Osnabrücker Bergrennen, Borgloh
- Bergrennen Mickhausen, Münster (Mickhausen)
- Herkules-Bergpreis, Kassel
- Wolsfelder Bergrennen, Wolsfeld
- Homburger Bergrennen, Homburg

=== Defunct ===
- Histo Bergcup Lauterbach, (Lütterz-Großenlüder)
- Lückendorfer Bergrennen, Zittau
- Langenburg Historic, Langenburg
- Schloßberg Historic, Gemsbach
- Schauinsland-Rennen, Freiburg
- Eggbergrennen, Bad Säckingen
- Naumburger Weinbergrennen,
- Gabelbachrennen, Illmenau
- Sauerland-Bergpreis, Bestwig
- Kyffhäuser Bergrennen
- Haldenhof Revival – Ludwigshafen (Bodensee)
- Missen – Allgäu in Bavaria
- Jochpass-Oldtimer-Memorial, Bad Hindelang
- Ziegenrücker Bergrennen, Ziegenrück
- Historischer ADAC Bergpreis, Happurg
- Historisches Grainau Eibsee Bergrennen, Grainau in Garmisch-Partenkirchen
- Presberg Bergrennen (Ransel/Rheingau)
- Auerberg-Klassik, Bernbeuren
- Stollberger Bergrennen
- Bergrennen Waldau-Steinbach
- Rennsteig Bergrennen
- Bergrennen am Planschwitzer Berg, Oelsnitz (Vogtland)
- Bergrennen Neumühle
- Bergrennen Mühlwand
- Heubergrennen, Friedrichsroda
- Heilbronner Bergpreis
- Happurger Bergrennen
- Bergprüfungsfahrt Unterwiesenthal-Fichtelberg
- Annaberger Bergrennen
- Adlersbergrennen, Suhl
- Adlersbergrennen, Zella-Mehlis

== Greece ==
=== Permanent circuits ===
- Athens Megara Circuit, Megara
- Serres Racing Circuit, Serres

==== Defunct ====
- Aiginio Circuit, Aiginio

=== Temporary circuits ===
==== Defunct ====
- Circuit of Corfu, Corfu
- Nea Smyrni Circuit, Nea Smyrni
- Rhodes Air Base, Maritsa
- Rhodes Circuit, Rhodes
- Tripoli Airfield Circuit, Tripoli

== Grenada ==
- Pearls International Raceway, Grenville

== Guatemala ==
=== Permanent circuits ===
- Autódromo Pedro Cofiño, Escuintla
- Guatemala Raceway, Escuintla

=== Temporary circuits ===
==== Defunct ====
- Base Naval del Pacifico, Escuintla
- Parque Las Ninfas, Amatitlán

== Guernsey ==
- Val de Terres, Guernsey

== Guyana ==
- South Dakota Circuit, Georgetown

== Haiti ==
=== Defunct ===
- Circuit 9, Port-au-Prince

== Honduras ==
=== Defunct ===
- Autodromo Mauricio Marchetti, Francisco Morazán Department

== Hong Kong ==
- Hong Kong Central Harbourfront Circuit, Central Harbourfront

== Hungary ==
=== Permanent circuits ===
†	MotoGP GP Venue	Balaton Park Circuit, Balatonfőkajár

- Euro-Ring, Örkény

†	Formula One GP Venue; MotoGP GP Venue	Hungaroring, Mogyoród

- Kakucsring, Kakucs
- Kaloring, Kalocsa
- Pannónia-Ring, Ostffyasszonyfa
- Rába-ring, Écs
- Rabócsi Ring, Máriapócs

=== Temporary circuits ===
==== Defunct ====
- Budapest Ferenc Liszt International Airport, Budapest
- Budapest Street Circuit, Budapest
- Kiskunlacházi Airport, Kiskunlacháza
- Mezőkövesdi Airport, Mezőkövesd
- Győr Circuit, Győr
- Népliget Park, Budapest
- Népliget Street Circuit, Népliget
- Pécs Street Circuit, Pécs
- Taszár Air Base, Taszár
- Veszprém-Szentkirályszabadja Airport, Szentkirályszabadja

=== Rallycross circuits ===
- Autócross Aréna Dömsöd, Dömsöd
- Kiskunlacházai Szinkronpálya, Kiskunlacháza
- Nyirád Racing Center, Nyirád
- Pusztaottlaka Rallycross, Pusztaottlaka
- Rabócsiring, Máriapócs
- Sio Rally Car Park, Ádánd

== Iceland ==
- Kvartmílubraut Kvartmíluklúbbsins, Hafnarfjörður

== India ==
=== Permanent circuits ===
†	Formula One GP Venue; MotoGP GP Venue	Buddh International Circuit, Greater Noida

- Madras International Circuit, Chennai
- Kari Motor Speedway, Coimbatore
- CoASTT High Performance Centre, Coimbatore

=== Street circuits ===
- Hyderabad Street Circuit, Hyderabad
- Chennai City Circuit, Chennai

==== Defunct ====
- Sholavaram Airstrip, Chennai
- Pune Street Circuit, Pune

=== New Racetracks (Under Construction) ===
- Nanoli Speedway, Pune
- Marque One, Kotapally
- Pista Motor Raceway, Hyderabad

== Indonesia ==
=== Permanent circuits ===
- Circuit Hill Peusar, Tasikmalaya

†	MotoGP GP Venue	Sentul International Circuit, Bogor

- Sirkuit Boyolali, Boyolali
- Simpang Sirkuit Lanay Jaya, East Kutai
- Sirkuit Balipat, Tapin
- Sirkuit Bulungan, Bulungan
- Sirkuit Cibatu, Majalengka
- Sirkuit Fregeb Maninggap Sai Gau Tak, Merauke
- Sirkuit Gelora Bung Tomo, Surabaya
- Sirkuit Gery Mang Kota Subang, Subang
- Sirkuit IMI Pancing, Medan
- Sirkuit Internasional Skyland, Musi Banyuasin
- Sirkuit Kalan Samarinda, Samarinda
- Sirkuit Kuala Tungkal Lokasi, Jambi
- Sirkuit Lanud Gading, Gunungkidul
- Sirkuit Manggul, Lahat
- Sirkuit Marido Tabalong, Tabalong
- Sirkuit Mijen, Semarang
- Sirkuit Padang Panjang Manna, Bengkulu
- Sirkuit Pantai Widuri, Pemalang
- Sirkuit Puncak Mario, Sidenreng Rappang
- Sirkuit Sabaru, Pontianak
- Sirkuit Sang Profesor, Gorontalo
- Sirkuit Sawahlunto, Sawahlunto
- Sirkuit Selagalas, Mataram City
- Sirkuit Soewondo Air Force Base, Medan
- Sirkuit Tembong Jaya, Serang
- Sirkuit Temindung Airport, Samarinda
- Tabing Airport Circuit, Padang
- Sirkuit Wonopringgo, Pekalongan
- Zabaq National Circuit, East Tanjung Jabung

=== Temporary circuits ===
- Alun-Alun Tegal Circuit, Tegal
- Bandungan Convention Center, Semarang
- BSD City Street Circuit, BSD City, South Tangerang
- Idi Regency Government Centre Circuit, East Aceh
- Jakarta International e-Prix Circuit, Ancol, North Jakarta
- Kajen City Square Street Track, Pekalongan

†	MotoGP GP Venue	Mandalika International Street Circuit, Central Lombok

- Sirkuit Alun-Alun Kebumen, Kebumen
- Sirkuit Alun-Alun Purbalingga, Purbalingga
- Sirkuit Alun-Alun Wonosobo, Wonosobo
- Sirkuit GOR Satria, Purwokerto

=== Defunct ===
- Jaya Ancol Circuit, Ancol, Jakarta
- Ria Kenjeran Park Circuit, Surabaya
- Lippo Village Street Circuit, Lippo Karawaci, Tangerang

== Iran ==
- Azadi Circuit, Tehran
- Zarandieh International Autodrome, Tehran

== Ireland ==
=== Permanent circuits ===
- Mondello Park, County Kildare

=== Temporary circuits ===
- Crossakiel Road Circuit, Crossakiel, County Meath
- Faugheen 50 Circuit, Carrick-on-Suir, County Tipperary
- Skerries Road Racing Circuit, County Dublin

==== Defunct ====
- Athy Circuit, Athy, County Kildare
- Ballyjamesduff Street Circuit, Ballyjamesduff, County Cavan
- Boyne 100 Circuit, Tullyallen, County Louth
- Carrigrohane Circuit, Carrigrohane, County Cork
- Corballis Circuit, Rathdrum, County Wicklow
- Cuairt Bhré, Bray, County Wicklow
- The Curragh, County Kildare
- Dún Laoghaire Street Circuit, Dún Laoghaire, County Dublin
- Dunboyne Circuit, Dunboyne, County Meath
- Dundalk Street Circuit, Dundalk, County Louth
- Fore Road Racing Circuit, Fore, County Westmeath
- Limerick Grand Prix Circuit, Limerick
- Phoenix Park Grand Prix Circuit, Dublin
- Tallaght Circuit, Tallaght, County Dublin
- Wicklow Circuit, Wicklow

=== Ovals ===
- Coolronan Raceway, Ballivor, County Meath
- Tipperary Raceway, Rosegreen, County Tipperary
- Waterford Raceway, Dungarvan

== Isle of Man ==
- Billown Circuit, Castletown

†	MotoGP GP Venue	Isle of Man TT Mountain Course, Douglas

- Jurby Airfield Circuit, Jurby

=== Defunct ===
- Clypse Course, Onchan
- Douglas Circuit, Douglas
- Four Inch Course, Douglas
- Highroads Course, Douglas
- St John's Short Course, St John's

== Israel ==
=== Permanent circuits ===
- ARAD Racing Track, Arad
- MotorCity Motorpark Racing Circuit, Beersheba
- Peza'el Circuit, Yifat

==== Defunct ====
- Formula Israel Circuit, Eilat

=== Temporary circuits ===
==== Defunct ====
- Barnea Beach Street Circuit, Ashkelon

== Italy ==
=== Permanent circuits ===
- Autodromo del Levante, Binetto
- Autodromo dell'Umbria, Magione
- Autodromo di Franciacorta, Castrezzato
- Autodromo di Modena, Rubiera
- Autodromo di Mores, Mores
- Autodromo di Pergusa, Enna
- Autodromo di Vairano, Pavia

†	Formula One GP Venue; MotoGP GP Venue	Autodromo Internazionale Enzo e Dino Ferrari, Imola

- Autodromo Gianni De Luca, Airola

†	Formula One GP Venue; MotoGP GP Venue	Autodromo Nazionale di Monza, Monza

- Autodromo Vallelunga "Piero Taruffi", Campagnano di Roma
- Autodromo Riccardo Paletti, Varano de' Melegari
- Autodromo Valle dei Templi, Racalmuto
- Centro Guida Sicura Aci Sara, Lainate
- Centro Sperimentale Balocco, Balocco
- Circuito del Sele, Battipaglia
- Circuito di Cellole, Cellole
- Circuito di Fiorano, Fiorano Modenese
- Circuito di Lombardore, Lombardore
- Circuito di Torretta, Torretta
- Circuito Internazionale d'Abruzzo, Ortona
- Circuito internazionale di Viterbo, Viterbo
- Circuito Tazio Nuvolari, Cervesina
- Castelletto Circuit, Castelletto di Branduzzo
- Cremona Circuit, San Martino del Lago

†	MotoGP GP Venue	Misano World Circuit Marco Simoncelli, Misano Adriatico

†	Formula One GP Venue; MotoGP GP Venue	Autodromo Internazionale del Mugello, Scarperia e San Piero

==== Defunct ====
- Aerautodromo di Modena, Modena
- Adria International Raceway, Adria
- Autodromo di Morano sul Po, Pontestura
- Autodromo Pista d'oro, Guidonia Montecelio
- Circuito Chiesuol del Fosso, Ferrara
- Circuito Istituto Sperimentale Auto e Motori, Anagni
- Nardò Ring, Nardò

=== Temporary circuits ===
- Circuito Campione, Campione d'Italia

==== Defunct ====
- Circuito automobilistico di Salerno, Salerno
- Circuito Automobilistico di Santa Gorizia, Gorizia
- Circuito Automobilistico di Vigevano, Vigevano
- Circuito Cittadino dell'EUR, Rome
- Circuito d'Asti, Piedmont
- Circuito Cittadino di Cagliari, Cagliari
- Circuito di Bergamo, Bergamo
- Circuito di Biella, Biella
- Circuito di Brescia, Brescia
- Circuito di Collemaggio, L'Aquila
- Circuito di Montichiari, Montichiari
- Circuito di Siracusa, Siracusa
- Circuito di Varese, Varese
- Circuito di Valle Giulia, Rome
- Circuito del Garda, Salò
- Circuito del Lario, Asso
- Circuito del Lungomare, Bari
- Circuito dell'Impero, Rome
- Circuito della Superba, Genoa
- Circuito delle Caldaie, Ascoli Piceno
- Circuito delle Madonie, Palermo
- Circuito di Ospedaletti, Ospedaletti
- Circuito Pietro Bordino, Alessandria
- Montenero Circuit, Livorno
- Cascine Park Circuit, Parco delle Cascine, Florence
- Favorita Park Circuit, Parco della Favorita, Palermo

†	Formula One GP Venue	Pescara Circuit, Pescara

- Riccione Street Circuit, Riccione
- Rome Urbe Airport, Rome
- Sempione Park Circuit, Milan
- Valentino Park Circuit, Turin

=== Speedway circuits ===
- Terenzano Speedway, Udine
- Santa Marina Stadium, Lonigo

==== Defunct ====
- Giavera del Montello Municipal Stadium, Giavera del Montello
- Stadio Moretti, Udine

=== Hillclimbs ===
- Bologna-Raticosa Hill Climb
- Lo Spino
- Coppa Del Chianti Classico
- Alpe Del Nevegal

Supersalita:

- Trento-Bondone Hill Climb, Trento
- Trofeo Luigi Fagioli Hillclimb, Gubbio
- Trofeo Vallecamonica
- Coppa Paolino Teodori – Ascoli
- Luzzi Sambucina
- Coppa Carotti Rieti – Terminillo
- Monte Erice

CIVM:

- Salita Del Costo
- Coppa Selva di Fasano
- Verzegnis
- Trofeo Scarfiotti Sarnano-Sassotetto
- Svolte di Popoli
- Coppa Nissena
- Pedavena – Croce d’Aune
- Cividale
- Alghero Scala Piccada

CIVSA:

- Cesana – Sestriere

== Jamaica ==
=== Permanent circuits ===
- Dover Raceway, Brown's Town, Saint Ann
- Jamwest Motorsports & Adventure Park, Little London, Westmoreland Parish

=== Temporary circuits ===
==== Defunct ====
- Vernam Field, Gimme-Me-Bit, Clarendon Parish

== Japan ==
=== Permanent circuits ===
- Asan Circuit, Miyoshi District, Tokushima, Tokushima Prefecture, Shikoku
- Autopolis, Hita District, Ōita Prefecture
- Bihoku Highland Circuit, Niimi, Okayama Prefecture
- Central Circuit, Taka District, Hyōgo Prefecture
- Ebisu Circuit, Nihonmatsu, Fukushima Prefecture
- Gunma Cycle Sports Center, Minakami, Gunma Prefecture

†	Formula One GP Venue; MotoGP GP Venue	Fuji Speedway, Oyama, Shizuoka Prefecture

- Maze Sea Circuit, Nishikanbara District, Niigata Prefecture
- Meihan Sportsland, Nara Prefecture
- Motorland Suzuka, Suzuka, Mie Prefecture
- Nasu Motor Sports Land, Kuroiso, Tokushima, Tochigi Prefecture
- Nakayama Circuit, Wake District, Okayama Prefecture
- Nikko Circuit, Utsunomiya, Tochigi Prefecture
- Okuibuki Motorpark, Shiga Prefecture

†	Formula One GP Venue	Okayama International Circuit, Aida, Okayama Prefecture

- Seto Nai Kai Inland Sea Circuit, Shikoku Island, Ehime Prefecture
- Sodegaura Forest Raceway, Sodegaura, Chiba Prefecture
- Sportsland SUGO, Murata, Miyagi Prefecture
- Sports Land Tamada, Hiroshima, Hiroshima Prefecture
- Sportsland Yamanashi, Nirasaki, Yamanashi Prefecture
- SPA Naoiri, Naoiri, Ōita Prefecture
- Spa Nishiura Motor Park, Gamagōri, Aichi Prefecture

†	Formula One GP Venue; MotoGP GP Venue	Suzuka International Racing Course, Suzuka, Mie Prefecture

- Suzuka Twin Circuit, Suzuka, Mie Prefecture
- Takasu Circuit, Fukui, Fukui Prefecture
- The Magarigawa Club, Minamibōsō, Chiba Prefecture
- Tokachi International Speedway, Sarabetsu, Hokkaido
- Tsukuba Circuit, Shimotsuma, Ibaraki Prefecture

†	MotoGP GP Venue	Mobility Resort Motegi, Motegi, Tochigi Prefecture

- YZ Circuit, Mizunami, Gifu Prefecture

==== Defunct ====
- Asama Highland Automobile Test Course, Tsumagoi, Gunma Prefecture
- Funabashi Circuit, Funabashi, Chiba Prefecture
- Hokkaido Speed Park, Kutchan, Abuta District, Shiribeshi, Hokkaido
- Inagawa Circuit, Inagawa, Kawabe District, Hyōgo Prefecture
- Mazda Mine Proving Ground, Mine, Yamaguchi Prefecture
- Mount Noro Speed Park, Kure, Hiroshima Prefecture
- Mutsuwan International Speedway, Noheji, Aomori Prefecture
- Sekia Hills DEC, Tamana District, Kumamoto Prefecture
- Sendai Hi-Land Raceway, Aoba-ku, Sendai, Miyagi Prefecture
- Shiraoi Car Land, Shiraoi, Hokkaido Prefecture
- Tamagawa Speedway, Kawasaki City, Kanagawa Prefecture
- Yatabe Test Track, Tsukuba, Ibaraki Prefecture

=== Temporary circuits ===
- Tokyo Street Circuit, Tokyo Prefecture

=== Auto Race circuits ===
- Hamamatsu Auto Race Track, Hamamatsu, Shizuoka Prefecture
- Iizuka Auto Race Track, Iizuka, Fukuoka Prefecture
- Kawaguchi Auto Race Mecca, Kawaguchi, Saitama Prefecture

=== Test circuits ===
- Bifuka Proving Ground, Bifuka, Hokkaido Prefecture
- Daigo Proving Ground and Research Center, Daigo, Ibaraki Prefecture
- Denso Abashiri Test Center, Abashiri, Hokkaido Prefecture
- Grandrive Proving Ground, Yokosuka, Kanagawa Prefecture
- Higashi-Fuji Technical Center, Susono, Shizuoka Prefecture
- Hino Trucks Proving Ground, Memuro, Hokkaido Prefecture
- Honda Safety & Riding Plaza Kyūshū, Kikuchi District, Kumamoto Prefecture
- Kikugawa Test Course, Kikugawa, Shizuoka Prefecture
- Public Works Research Institute, Tsukuba, Ibaraki Prefecture
- Sagara Proving Ground, Makinohara, Shizuoka Prefecture
- Shimokawa, Shibetsu, Hokkaido Prefecture
- TS-Takata Circuit, Akitakata, Hiroshima Prefecture
- WAcom Hokkaido Proving Ground, Mukawa, Hokkaido Prefecture
- Yamaha Motorcycle Test Course, Fukuroi, Shizuoka Prefecture

== Jersey ==
- Bouley Bay Hill Climb, Trinity

=== Defunct ===
- Saint Helier Circuit, St Helier

== Jordan ==
- Manja International Circuit, Amman

== Kazakhstan ==
- Sokol International Racetrack, Almaty

== Kenya ==
=== Defunct ===
- Nakuru Motor Racing Circuit (aka Langalanga), Gilgil, Nakuru
- Nairobi Racing Track, Embasaki, Nairobi Province

== Kuwait ==
- Kuwait Motor Town, Ali Sabah Al Salem, Ahmadi Governorate

== Laos ==
- Vientiane Racing Circuit (VRC), Ban Dông, Vientiane Province

== Latvia ==
=== Permanent circuits ===
- Biķernieki Complex Sports Base, Riga
- 333 Sports Complex, Riga

==== Defunct ====
- Mežaparks, Riga

=== Speedway circuits ===
- Riga Speedway Stadium, Riga
- Stadium Lokomotīve, Daugavpils

== Lebanon ==
- Racing Park Mtein, Mtein

=== Defunct ===
- Beirut Circuit, Beirut

== Libya ==
=== Defunct ===
- Autodromo della Mellaha, Tripoli

== Lithuania ==
=== Permanent circuits ===
- Nemuno Žiedas, Kačerginė

=== Temporary circuits ===
- Palanga Circuit, Palanga

=== Rallycross circuits ===
- Vilkyčiai Circuit, Šilutė

== Luxembourg ==
- Circuit Goodyear, Colmar-Berg

=== Defunct ===
- Findel Circuit, Findel
- Kirchberg Historic, Kirchberg

=== Hillclimb venues ===
- Hill Race Eschdorf

== Macau ==
- Guia Circuit, Macau (see also Macau Grand Prix)

== Malta ==
- Mdina Grand Prix, Mdina

== Malaysia ==
=== Permanent circuits ===
- Dato Sagor Circuit, Kampung Gajah
- Melaka International Motorsport Circuit, Ayer Keroh

†	Formula One GP Venue; MotoGP GP Venue	Sepang International Circuit, Kuala Lumpur

==== Defunct ====
†	MotoGP GP Venue	Johor Circuit, Johor Bahru

†	MotoGP GP Venue	Shah Alam Circuit

=== Temporary circuits ===
==== Defunct ====
- Johor Street Circuit, Johor Bahru
- Klang Street Circuit, Klang
- Kuala Lumpur Street Circuit, Kuala Lumpur
- Putrajaya Street Circuit, Putrajaya

== Maldives ==
- Hulhumale' Racing Track, Malé

== Mexico ==
=== Permanent circuits ===
- Autodromo Bosques del Angel, Singuilucan, Hidalgo
- Autódromo Chiapas, Tuxtla Gutiérrez, Chiapas
- Autódromo de León, León, Guanajuato, Guanajuato
- Autódromo de Quéretaro, Querétaro, Querétaro
- Autódromo del Águila, Morelia, Michoacán
- Autódromo Durango, Durango, Durango
- Autódromo Francisco Villa, Chihuahua City, Chihuahua
- Autódromo Gómez Palacio, Torreón, Coahuila

†	Formula One GP Venue	Autódromo Hermanos Rodríguez, Mexico City

- Autodromo Internacional de Cancún, Cancún, Quintana Roo
- Autódromo Miguel E. Abed, Amozoc, Puebla
- Autódromo Moisés Solana, Pachuca, Hidalgo
- Autódromo Monterrey, Monterrey, Nuevo León
- Autódromo Potosino, San Luis Potosí, San Luis Potosí
- Autódromo San Luis 400, San Luis Potosí, San Luis Potosí
- Autódromo Yucatán, Yucatán
- Circuito Centro Dinámico Pegaso, Toluca, Estado de México
- Circuito Motokart Tehuacán, Tehuacán, Puebla
- El Dorado Speedway, Juan Aldama, Chihuahua
- Óvalo Aguascalientes México, Aguascalientes, Aguascalientes
- Trióvalo Internacional de Cajititlán, Guadalajara, Jalisco

==== Defunct ====
- Autódromo Chihuahua, Chihuahua City, Chihuahua
- Autódromo de Saltillo, Saltillo, Coahuila
- Autódromo Guadalajara (also known as Autódromo Hermanos Gallo, Autódromo Toluquilla), Guadalajara, Jalisco
- Autódromo Internacional de Zacatecas, Zacatecas, Zacatecas
- Autódromo La Cantera, Chihuahua City, Chihuahua
- Autódromo La Joya, Ciudad Juárez, Chihuahua
- Autódromo Pablo Gutiérrez Arcos, El Llano, Aguascalientes
- Autódromo Super Jarocho, Veracruz, Veracruz

=== Temporary circuits ===
==== Defunct ====
- Circuito Callejero "T" Adatiz, Atizapán, Estado de México
- Circuito de las Américas, Cancún, Quintana Roo
- Fundidora Park Circuit, Monterrey, Nuevo León

== Monaco ==
†	Formula One GP Venue	Circuit de Monaco, Monte Carlo

== Mongolia ==
- Mongol63 Circuit, Ulaanbaatar

== Montenegro ==
- Aerodromu Špiro Mugoša, Podgorica

=== Hillclimb venues ===
- Glava Zete
- Kotor-Trojica

== Morocco ==
- Circuit de Vitesse Sidi Daoui Oued Zem, Oued Zem
- Circuit International Automobile Moulay El Hassan, Marrakesh

=== Defunct ===
†	Formula One GP Venue	Ain-Diab Circuit, Ain Diab, Casablanca-Settat

- Anfa Circuit, Casablanca, Casablanca-Settat
- Circuit Automobile de Kénitra, Kenitra, Rabat-Salé-Kénitra
- Circuit d'Agadir, Agadir, Souss-Massa
- La Corniche, Casablanca, Casablanca-Settat
- Mohammedia, Mohammedia, Casablanca-Settat

== Mozambique ==
- Autódromo Internacional de Maputo, Maputo

=== Defunct ===
- Circuito da Beira, Beira, Sofala
- Lourenço Marques street circuit, Maputo

== Myanmar ==
- Yangon Motorsport Complex, Yangon

== Namibia ==
=== Permanent tracks ===
- Tony Rust Raceway, Windhoek, Khomas Region

=== Oval tracks ===
- Walvis Bay Motorsport Park, Walvis Bay, Erongo

== Netherlands ==
=== Permanent circuits ===
- Circuit de Geer, Oss
- Circuit de Landsard, Eindhoven

†	Formula One GP Venue	Circuit Zandvoort, Zandvoort

- MAB Circuit Texel, Texel

†	MotoGP GP Venue	TT Circuit Assen, Assen

=== Oval circuits ===
- Acon Autocross Circuit, Sint Maarten
- Blauwhuis Speedway, Blauwhuis
- JaBa Circuit Posterholt, Posterholt
- Midland Circuit Lelystad, Lelystad
- Raceway Ter Apel, Ter Apel
- Raceway Venray, Venray
- Speedway Emmen, Emmen

=== Temporary circuits ===
- Varsselring, Hengelo
- Circuit Paalgraven, Oss
- Luttenbergring, Overijssel
- ZZ Circuit, Zeerijp

==== Defunct ====
- Allee-circuit, Wijnandsrade
- Beekse Bergen, Hilvarenbeek
- Circuit Barneveld, Barneveld
- Circuit de Vaart, Almere
- Circuit Maren-Kessel, North Brabant
- Circuit Oosterplas, 's-Hertogenbosch
- Circuit van Drenthe, De Haar
- Circuit van Tubbergen, Tubbergen
- Circuit Wordragen, Ammerzoden
- Circuit Zuid-Limburg, Beek
- Eemshaven Circuit, Eemshaven
- Gilze-Rijen, Gilze en Rijen
- Helmond Circuit, Helmond
- Mavo-Circuit, Born
- Tolbert CC Circuit, Midwolde
- Welschap Airfield Circuit, Eindhoven
- Woensdrecht Airfield Circuit, Woensdrecht
- Zandvoort Street Circuit, Zandvoort

=== Rallycross circuits ===
- Eurocircuit, Valkenswaard

== New Zealand ==
=== Permanent circuits ===
- Euromarque Motorsport Park, Christchurch
- Hampton Downs Motorsport Park, North Waikato
- Highlands Motorsport Park, Cromwell
- Manfeild: Circuit Chris Amon, Feilding
- Taupo International Motorsport Park, Taupo
- Teretonga Park, Invercargill
- Timaru International Motor Raceway (Levels), Timaru

==== Defunct ====
- Baypark Raceway, Mount Maunganui
- Levin Motor Racing Circuit, Levin
- Pukekohe Park Raceway, Pukekohe

==== Under construction ====
- Thunder Ridge Motorsport Park, Ngawaro, Bay of Plenty

=== Temporary circuits ===
- Cemetery Circuit, Wanganui
- Greymouth Street Circuit, Greymouth, New Zealand
- Paeroa Street Circuit, Paeroa
- Port Nelson Street Circuit, Nelson

==== Defunct ====
- Ardmore Circuit, South Auckland
- Dunedin Street Circuit, Dunedin
- Hamilton Street Circuit, Hamilton City
- Hawkesbury Road Circuit, Renwick
- Mairehau Circuit, Christchurch
- Ohakea Circuit, Bulls
- Wellington Street Circuit, Wellington City
- Whangārei Street Circuit, Whangārei
- Whenuapai Airfield Circuit, Auckland
- Wigram Airfield Circuit, Christchurch

=== Dirt track ovals ===
- 21 Speedway, Meremere, Waikato
- Baypark Speedway, Mount Maunganui, Bay of Plenty
- Beachlands Speedway, Dunedin, Otago
- Central Motor Speedway, Cromwell, Otago
- Central Energy Trust Arena, Palmerston North Central, Manawatu-Whanganui
- Eastern States Speedway, Blenheim, Marlborough
- Gisborne Speedway, Awapuni, Gisborne
- Greenstone Park Speedway, Greymouth, West Coast
- Huntly International Speedway, Huntly, Waikato
- Kihikihi Speedway, Kihikihi, Waikato
- Meeanee Speedway, Napier, Hawke's Bay
- Moore Park Speedway, West Melton, Canterbury
- Nelson Speedway, Richmond, Tasman
- Ocean View Speedway, Whanganui, Manawatu-Whanganui
- Oreti Park Speedway, Invercargill, Southland
- Paradise Valley Speedway, Ngongotahā Valley, Bay of Plenty
- Riverside Speedway, Oreti Beach, Southland
- Robertson Prestige International Speedway, Palmerston North, Manawatu-Whanganui
- Rosebank Speedway, Avondale, Auckland
- Ruapuna Speedway, Christchurch, Canterbury
- Springs Speedway, Western Springs, Auckland
- Stratford Speedway, Stratford, Taranaki
- Waikaraka Park, Onehunga, Auckland
- Wellington Family Speedway, Upper Hutt, Wellington
- Woodford Glen Speedway, Kaiapoi, Canterbury

=== Drag strips ===
- Amisfield Dragstrip, Tokoroa, Waikato
- Euromarque Motorsport Park, Christchurch, Canterbury
- Masterton Motorplex, Masterton, Wellington
- Meremere Dragway, Meremere, Waikato
- Motueka Aerodrome, Motueka, Tasman
- Taupo International Motorsport Park, Taupo

==== Defunct ====
- Kerrs Road, Wiri
- Muriwai Beach, Muriwai
- Napier Airport
- Thunderpark, Hastings

== North Macedonia ==
=== Permanent circuits ===
- Kičevo Circuit, Kičevo

=== Temporary circuits ===
==== Defunct ====
- Skopje Street Course, Skopje

== Norway ==
=== Permanent circuits ===
- Arctic Circle Raceway, Mo i Rana
- Motorcenter Norway, Sokndal
- Lånkebanen, Hell
- Rudskogen, Rakkestad
- Vålerbanen, Braskereidfoss

==== Under construction ====
- Fjord Motorpark, Karmøy

=== Temporary circuits ===
==== Defunct ====
- Grenland Ring, Skien
- Nærbø, Nærbø
- Racing Festival Street Circuit, Oslo

=== Rallycross circuits ===
- Ålesund Motorstadion, Møre og Romsdal
- Bjorli Motorsenter, Innlandet
- Bollandsmoen Motorbane, Trøndelag
- Dråvika Motorsportsenter, Nordland
- Eikås Motorsport Center, Vestland
- Finnskogbanen, Innlandet
- Fuglehaugen Motorsenter, Buskerud
- Grenland Motorsportsenter, Telemark
- Harstad Motorsportsenter, Troms
- Hitra Motorsportssenter, Trøndelag
- Kvenvikmoen Motorpark, Finnmark
- Momarken Bilbane, Østfold
- Ramsfjordmoen Motorstadion, Tromsø
- Røssvoll Motorstadion, Røssvoll
- Rugslandsbanen, Agder
- Tynset Motorsenter, Innlandet
- Vikedal Motorbane, Rogaland

==== Defunct ====
- Lyngåsbanen, Buskerud

=== Drag strips ===
- Gardermoen Raceway, Gardermoen

=== Frozen lake circuits ===
- Bogstadvannet, Oslo
- Gjersjøen, Oppegård
- Mjøsa, Innlandet

=== Speedways ===
- Elgane, Varhaug
- Grenland Speedway Arena, Skien
- Sørlandsparken Speedway, Agder

==== Defunct ====
- Dælenenga idrettspark, Oslo
- Krohnsminde, Bergen
- Lerkendal Stadion, Trondheim
- Maier Arena Tønsberg, Tønsberg

== Oman ==
- Muscat Speedway, Muscat

== Pakistan ==
- Karachi Omni Racing Track, Karachi

=== Defunct ===
- AM Speedway, Sindh

== Paraguay ==
=== Permanent circuits ===
- Autódromo Víctor Rubén Dumot, Capiatá

=== Dirt tracks ===
- Autodromo Centro Quiindyense De Volantes, Quiindy
- Autódromo Erich Lautenschlager, Itapúa
- Autódromo Farid Rahal, Alto Paraná

== Panama ==
=== Permanent circuits ===
- Autódromo Internacional de Panamá, Mendoza, Panamá Oeste Province

==== Defunct ====
- Autódromo Panamá, Sajalices, Panamá Oeste Province

=== Temporary circuits ===
==== Defunct ====
- Río Hato Circuit, Río Hato, Coclé Province

== Peru ==
=== Permanent circuits ===
- Autódromo La Chutana, Pucusana
- Autódromo Tacna, Tacna

==== Defunct ====
- Autódromo de Santa Rosa, Santa Rosa, Lima
- Circuito Agua Dulce, Chorrillos, Lima

=== Temporary circuits ===
==== Defunct ====
- El Campo de Marte, Jesús María District, Lima

== Philippines ==
=== Permanent tracks ===
- Batangas Racing Circuit, Rosario, Batangas
- Carmona Racing Circuit, Carmona, Cavite
- Clark International Speedway, Angeles City
- Pampanga International Circuit, Porac, Pampanga
- Tarlac Circuit Hill, San Jose, Tarlac

==== Defunct ====
- Subic International Raceway, Subic Bay Freeport Zone

== Poland ==
=== Permanent circuits ===
- Autodrom Jastrząb, Radom
- Autodrom Pomorze, Pszczółki
- Autodrom Słomczyn, Słomczyn
- Bednary Driving City, Bednary
- Driveland Poland, Słabomierz
- Moto Park Kraków, Kraków
- MotoArena Toruń, Toruń
- Moto Park Ułęż, Grabowce Górne
- Motopark Koszalin, Koszalin
- Silesia Ring, Kamień Śląski
- Tor Białystok, Białystok
- Tor Kielce, Kielce
- Tor Krzywa, Osła
- Tor Łódź, Łódź
- Tor Modlin, Nowy Dwór Mazowiecki
- Tor Poznań, Poznań
- WallraV Race Center, Zielona Góra
- Wyrazów Racing Circuit, Częstochowa

==== Defunct ====
- Pixers Ring, Osła

=== Temporary circuits ===
==== Defunct ====
- Gliwice Street Circuit, Gliwice
- Kraków Street Circuit, Kraków
- Warsaw Street Circuit, Warsaw
- Kołobrzeg, Kołobrzeg
- Magnolia Circuit, Szczecin
- Ostpreußenring, Mrągowo
- Silesian Park, Katowice
- Tor Opole, Kamień Śląski
- Toruński tor uliczny, Toruń

=== Speedway circuits ===
- Alfred Smoczyk Stadium, Leszno
- Arena Częstochowa, Częstochowa
- Florian Kapała Stadium, Rawicz
- Golęcin Speedway Stadium, Jeżyce
- Grudziądz Speedway Stadium, Grudziądz
- Józef Piłsudski Stadium (Bydgoszcz), Bydgoszcz
- Kraków Speedway Stadium, Kraków
- Marian Spychała Speedway Stadium, Opole
- Moto Arena Łódź, Łódź
- Motoarena Toruń, Toruń
- Olympic Stadium (Wrocław), Wrocław
- Ostrów Wielkopolski Stadium, Ostrów Wielkopolski
- Polonia Piła Stadium, Piła
- Rybnik Stadium, Rybnik
- Stadion im. Edwarda Jancarza, Gorzów Wielkopolski
- Stadion OSiR Skałka, Świętochłowice
- Start Gniezno Stadium, Gniezno
- Zbigniew Podlecki Stadium, Gdańsk
- Zielona Góra Speedway Stadium, Zielona Góra

==== Defunct ====
- Gwardia Warsaw Stadium, Warsaw
- Jaskółcze Gniazdo Municipal Stadium, Tarnów
- KS Apator Stadium, Toruń
- MOSiR Stadium (Bystrzyca), Lublin
- MOSiR Stadium (Krosno), Krosno
- RKS Skra Stadium, Warsaw

=== Hillclimb venues ===
- Limanowa

== Portugal ==
=== Permanent circuits ===
†	Formula One GP Venue; MotoGP GP Venue	Algarve International Circuit, Portimão

†	Formula One GP Venue; MotoGP GP Venue	Circuito do Estoril, Estoril

- Circuito Vasco Sameiro, Braga

=== Temporary circuits ===
- Circuito Internacional de Vila Real, Vila Real

==== Defunct ====
- Circuito Chaços del Rei, Trancoso

†	Formula One GP Venue	Circuito da Boavista, Porto

- Circuito da Granja do Marquês, Sintra
- Circuito de Cascais, Cascais
- Circuito de Montes Claros, Monsanto Forest Park
- Circuito Guarda, Guarda
- Circuito Lordelo do Ouro, Porto
- Circuito Sabugal, Sabugal
- Circuito Urbano de Faro, Faro

†	Formula One GP Venue	Circuito de Monsanto, Lisbon

- Pista de Torre de Moncorvo, Torre de Moncorvo
- Pista Pinhel, Pinhel
- Trofeu Urbano Foz Côa, Vila Nova de Foz Côa

=== Hillclimb venues ===
- Falperra International Hill Climb
- Rampa de Boticas
- Rampa Serra Da Estrela – Covilha
- Rampa de Santa Luzia

=== Rallycross circuits ===
- Eurocircuito de Lousada, Lousada
- Pista Automóvel de Montalegre, Montalegre

== Puerto Rico ==
=== Permanent circuits ===
- Salinas Speedway, Salinas

==== Defunct ====
- Antilles Auto Racing Circuit, Caguas
- Autódromo Rafael Hernández Colón, Ponce
- Riverside Speedway, Añasco

=== Temporary circuits ===
==== Defunct ====
- Isla Grande Airport Circuit, San Juan

=== Drag strips ===
- Autódromo José "Cheo" Gómez, Arecibo
- Carolina Speedway, Carolina
- Rio Drag Park, Juana Díaz

== Qatar ==
†	MotoGP GP Venue; Formula 1 GP Venue	Lusail International Circuit, Doha

== Romania ==
=== Permanent circuits ===
- MotorPark Romania, Adâncata
- Transilvania Motor Ring, Ungheni

=== Temporary circuits ===
==== Defunct ====
- Bucharest Ring, Bucharest
- Bulevardul Aviatorilor Circuit, Bucharest
- Circuit Reșița, Reșița
- Galacz Circuit, Galacz

== Russia ==
=== Permanent circuits ===
- Autodrom Moscow, Moscow
- Autodrom Saint Petersburg, Saint Petersburg
- Dmitrovsky Autopolygon
- Fort Grozny Autodrom, Grozny
- Igora Drive, Sosnovo
- Kazan Ring, Kazan
- Kursk Ring
- Moscow Raceway, Moscow
- NRING Circuit, Nizhny Novgorod
- Orlovsky Ring
- Primring, Artyom, Russia
- Red Ring, Krasnoyarsk
- Sirius Autodrom, Sochi
- Simbirskiy Sport Park, Ulyanovsk (under construction)
- Smolensk Ring, Smolensk

=== Street circuits ===
- Kurskaya Duga, Kursk
- Lipetskiy Climb (Lipetsky Podjom), Lipetsk
- Luzhniki Olympic Complex
- Neva Ring (Nevskoe Ring), Saint Petersburg
- Moscow Street Circuit

†	Formula One GP Venue	Sochi Autodrom, Sochi (see also Russian Grand Prix)

- Togliatti Ring, Togliatti

=== Speedway & Ice Speedway circuits ===
- Anatoly Stepanov Stadium

== Saint Kitts and Nevis ==
- St. James Raceway, Whitehall

== Saudi Arabia ==
=== Permanent circuits ===
- Dirab Motorsport Park, Riyadh
- Jeddah Raceway, Jeddah
- Reem International Circuit, Riyadh

=== Temporary circuits ===
†	Formula One GP Venue	Jeddah Corniche Circuit, Jeddah (see also Saudi Arabian Grand Prix)

==== Defunct ====
- Riyadh Street Circuit, Diriyah

==== Under Construction ====
- Qiddiya Speed Park Track, Qiddiya City

== Senegal ==
- Circuit de Dakar Baobabs, Thiès Region

== Serbia ==
=== Permanent circuits ===
- Autodrom Beranovac, Kraljevo
- National Driving Academy (NAVAK), Subotište

=== Temporary circuits ===
==== Defunct ====
- Batajnica Air Base, Batajnica
- Belgrade Ušće Street Circuit, Belgrade
- Beograd Kalemegdan Park Circuit, Belgrade
- Kragujevac, Šumadija
- Miseluk Street Circuit, Novi Sad

== Singapore ==
†	Formula One GP Venue	Marina Bay Street Circuit, Downtown Core

=== Defunct ===
- Thomson Road Grand Prix circuit, Thomson Road

== Slovakia ==
=== Permanent circuits ===
- Automotodróm Slovakia Ring, Orechová Potôň

=== Temporary circuits ===
==== Defunct ====
- Badínsky Okruh, Badín
- Boľkovce, Boľkovce
- Cigelsky Okruh, Sebedražie
- Circuit de Cigel, Prievidza
- Holíč, Holíč
- Kopčany, Kopčany
- Liptovsky Ondrej Airport, Liptovsky Ondrej
- Piešťany Airport, Piešťany
- Podjarovinsky Okruh, Nové Mesto nad Váhom
- Šarišský Okruh, Prešov
- Trenčín Airport, Trenčín
- Trenčiansky Priemyselný Park, Trenčín
- Žilina Airport, Dolný Hričov

=== Hillclimb venues ===
- Baba
- Jankov Vrsok Banovce
- Jahodna
- Dobsinsky Kopec

== Slovenia ==
=== Permanent circuits ===
- AMZS Safe Driving Centre Complex (Vransko), Vransko
- Circuit Poligon Gaj, Cerklje ob Krki
- Lindauring, Lendava

=== Temporary circuits ===
==== Defunct ====
- Letališče Portorož Airfield, Sečovlje
- Ljubljana Street Circuit, Ljubljana

=== Speedway circuits ===
- Ilirija Sports Park, Zgornja Šiška
- Matija Gubec Stadium, Krško
- Petišovci Stadium, Lendava

=== Hillclimb venues ===
- Gorjanci
- Ilirska Bistrica
- Podnanos
- Rogla
- Lucine
- Tolmin

== South Africa ==
=== Permanent tracks ===
- Aldo Scribante Circuit, Gqeberha
- Dezzi Raceway, Port Shepstone
- Fast5 Motorsport Raceway, Alberton
- Killarney Motor Racing Complex (WPMC), Cape Town

†	Formula One GP Venue; MotoGP GP Venue	Kyalami, Gauteng

- Mahem Raceway, Pretoria
- Midvaal Raceway (previously Race-Rite Raceway), Gauteng

†	MotoGP GP Venue	Phakisa Freeway, Welkom

- Polokwane Racetrack, Limpopo

†	Formula One GP Venue	Prince George Circuit, East London

- Red Star Raceway, Delmas
- The Rock Raceway, Brakpan
- Zwartkops Raceway, Gauteng

==== Defunct ====
- Blue Circle Raceway, Lichtenburg
- Brandkop Circuit, Bloemfontein
- Gosforth Park, Germiston
- Grand Central Circuit, Midrand
- Roy Hesketh Circuit, Pietermaritzburg
- WesBank Raceway, Gauteng

=== Temporary circuits ===
==== Defunct ====
- Alexandra Park Street Circuit, Pietermaritzburg
- Cape Town Street Circuit, Cape Town
- Durban Street Circuit, Durban
- Germiston Street Circuit, Germiston
- Gunner's Circle, Cape Town
- Paarden Eiland Circuit, Paarden Eiland
- Palmietfontein Circuit, Katlehong
- Sacks Circle Circuit, Cape Town

=== Hillclimbs ===
- Knysna Simola Hillclimb, Knysna

=== Drag strips ===
- Tarlton International Raceway, Krugersdorp

== South Korea ==
=== Permanent circuits ===
- Everland Speedway, Yongin, Gyeonggi-do
- Inje Speedium, Inje, Gangwon-do

†	Formula One GP Venue	Korea International Circuit, Yeongam, Jeollanam-do

- Pocheon Raceway, Gyeonggi Province
- Taebaek Racing Park, Gangwon-do

==== Defunct ====
- Ansan Circuit, Ansan, Gyeonggi
- Munmak Balborin Motor Park, Wonju, Gangwon

=== Temporary circuits ===
==== Defunct ====
- Changwon Street Circuit, South Gyeongsang
- Seoul Street Circuit, Seoul

== Spain ==
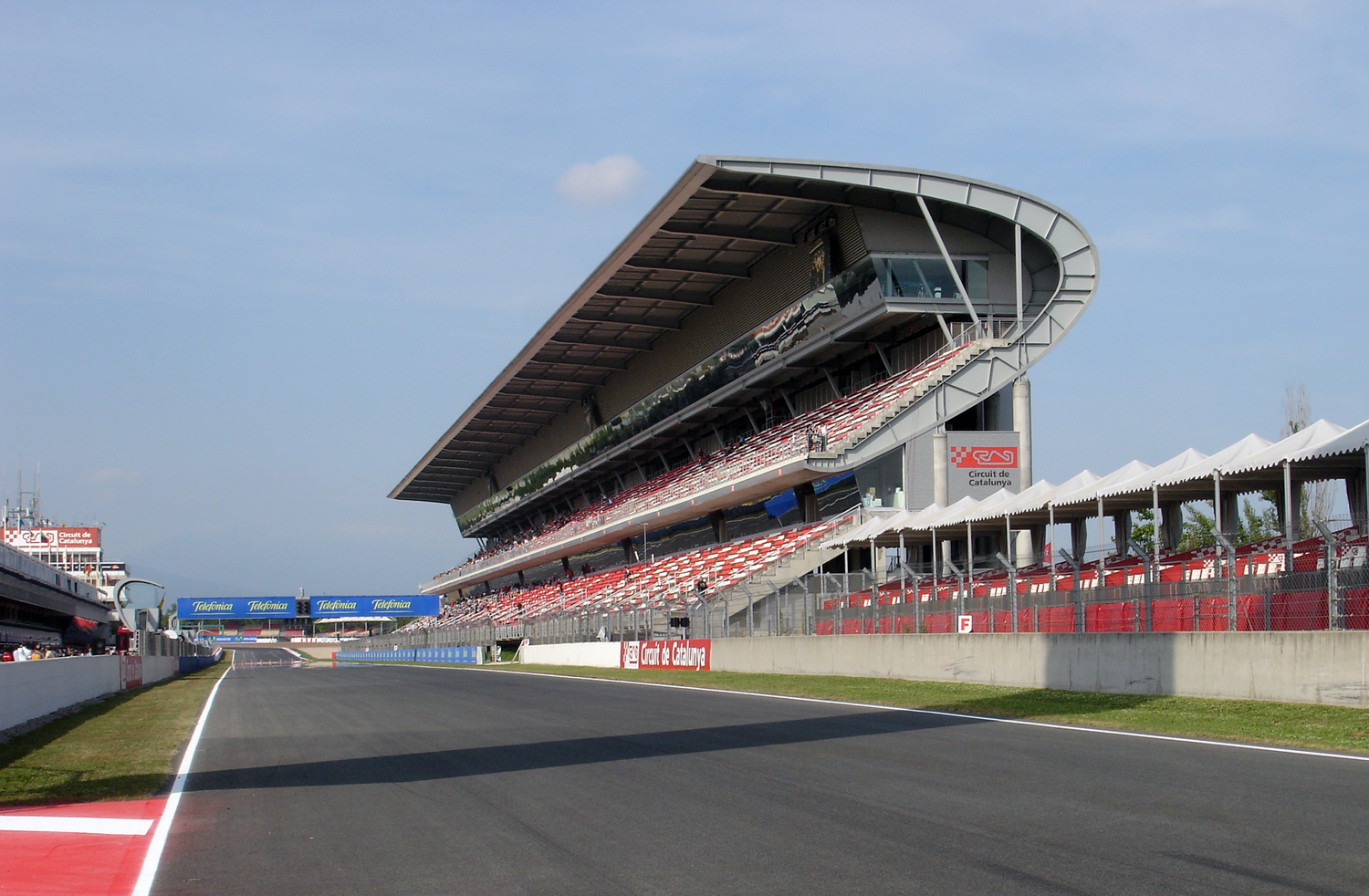
Circuit de Barcelona-Catalunya

=== Permanent circuits ===
- Aspar Circuit, Algemesí-Guadassuar
- Circuito de Albacete, Albacete
- Circuito de Alcarrás, Alcarràs
- Circuito de Almería, Tabernas, Almería
- Circuito de Andalucía, Tabernas, Almería

†	Formula One GP Venue; MotoGP GP Venue	Circuit de Barcelona-Catalunya, Montmeló (Barcelona)

- Circuit de Calafat, L'Ametlla de Mar
- Circuito de Cartagena, Cartagena
- Circuito de los Milanos Fuente Alamo, Fuente Álamo de Murcia
- Circuito de Navarra, Los Arcos
- Circuito Guadix, Granada
- Circuito Islas Canarias, Telde, Gran Canaria
- Circuit Mallorca Llucmajor, L'Arenal, (Palma de Mallorca)
- Circuito Maspalomas, Las Palmas
- Circuito Monteblanco, Huelva

†	Formula One GP Venue; MotoGP GP Venue	Circuito de Jerez – Ángel Nieto, Jerez de la Frontera

- Circuito de Velocidad Kotarr, Tubilla del Lago

†	Formula One GP Venue; MotoGP GP Venue	Circuito de Madrid Jarama - RACE, Madrid

†	MotoGP GP Venue	Circuit Ricardo Tormo, Cheste (Valencia)

†	MotoGP GP Venue	MotorLand Aragón, Alcañiz

- Parcmotor Castellolí, Castellolí, Barcelona

==== Defunct ====
- Autódromo de Sitges-Terramar, Sitges, Barcelona
- Circuito La Torrica - Fuente Álamo, Fuente Álamo de Murcia

=== Temporary circuits ===
==== Future ====
†	Formula One GP Venue	Madring, Madrid

==== Defunct ====
- Bilbao Street Circuit, Bilbao
- Circuito de Alcorcón-Móstoles y Villaviciosa, Alcorcón
- Circuito de Badajoz, Badajoz
- Circuit del Baix Penedès, Stiges
- Circuito de Guadarrama, Madrid
- Circuito Guadalope, Alcañiz
- Circuito Lasarte, Lasarte-Oria
- Circuito Urbano de La Bañeza, La Bañeza
- Circuit de Llevant, Mataró

†	Formula One GP Venue; MotoGP GP Venue	Montjuïc Circuit, Barcelona

†	Formula One GP Venue	Pedralbes Circuit, Barcelona

- Tarragona, Tarragona

†	Formula One GP Venue	Valencia Street Circuit, Valencia

- Villafranca, Villafranca (Valencia)

=== Test circuits ===
- Ascari Race Resort, Ronda
- Idiada Test Track, Santa Oliva, Tarragona

=== Rallycross circuits ===
- Ciudad Deportiva Islas Canarias, Telde, Gran Canaria

=== Hillclimb venues ===
- Subida Ubrique-Benaocaz, Ubrique, Andalusia
- Subida Peñas Blancas-Estepona, Estepona, Andalusia
- Subida al Fito, Arriondas, Asturias

== Sri Lanka ==
=== Permanent circuits ===
- Kanway Autodrome, Mirigama
- Katukurunda Racing Track, Kalutara
- Pannala International Racing Circuit, Pannala

=== Temporary circuits ===
==== Defunct ====
- Colombo Street Circuit, Colombo

== Suriname ==
- Suriname Motorsport Park (Motosur), Afobakaweg, Rama

== Sweden ==
=== Permanent circuits ===
†	Formula One GP Venue	Anderstorp Raceway, Anderstorp

- Drivecenter Arena, Fällfors
- Falkenbergs Motorbana, Vinberg
- GotlandRing, Kappelshamn

†	MotoGP GP Venue	Karlskoga Motorstadion, Karlskoga

- Kinnekulle Ring, Kinnekulle
- Linköpings Motorstadion, Linköping
- Ljungbyheds Motorbana, Ljungbyhed
- Mantorp Park, Mantorp
- Mittsverigebanan, Härnösand
- Ring Knutstorp, Helsingborg
- Sturup Raceway, Malmö
- Tierp Arena, Tierp

==== Defunct ====
- Björkvikring, Björkvik
- Dalslandring, Dals Långed

=== Temporary circuits ===
==== Defunct ====
- Göteborg City Race, Gothenburg

†	MotoGP GP Venue	Hedemora Circuit, Hedemora

- Jämtlands Raceway, Jämtland
- Norra Vram, Norra Vram
- Norrköpings GP, Norrköping

†	MotoGP GP Venue	Råbelövsbanan, Kristianstad

- Skarpnäck Airfield Circuit, Skarpnäcksfältet
- Skövde Airport Circuit, Skövde
- Solvalla Stockholm, Stockholm

=== Rallycross circuits ===
- Höljesbanan, Höljes, Värmland
- Piteå Motorstadion, Piteå, Norrbotten County
- Strängnäs Motorstadion, Strängnäs, Södermanland

=== Speedway circuits ===
- Avesta Motorstadion, Krylbo, Dalarna
- Gislaved Motorbana, Gislaved, Småland
- Grevby Motorstadion, Mariestad, Västergötland
- Hisstech AB Arena, Hallstavik, Uppland
- Huddinge Motorstadion, Huddinge, Stockholm County
- Kalvholmen Motorstadion, Karlstad, Värmland
- Kumla Motorstadion, Kumla, Närke
- Linköping Motorstadion, Hackefors, Linköping
- Ljungheden, Västervik, Småland
- Malmö Motorstadion, Malmö, Scania
- Motala Arena, Motala, Östergötland
- Nässjö Motorstadion, Nässjö, Småland
- Norrköping Motorstadion, Norrköping, Östergötland
- Nyköpings Motorstadion, Nyköping, Södermanland
- Smedstadion, Eskilstuna, Södermanland
- Vetlanda Motorstadion, Vetlanda, Småland

==== Defunct ====
- Avestavallen, Avesta, Dalarna
- Gubbängens IP, Enskede-Årsta-Vantör, Söderort
- Hammarby IP, Stockholm, Stockholm County
- Malmö Stadion, Malmö, Scania
- Nationalarenan, Stockholm, Stockholm County
- Snälltorpet, Eskilstuna, Södermanland
- Stockholm Olympic Stadium, Stockholm, Stockholm County
- Tallhult Motorstadion, Hagfors, Värmland
- Ullevi, Gothenburg, Västergötland

=== Frozen lake circuits ===
- Rämen, Dalarna

== Switzerland ==
=== Permanent circuits ===
- Circuit de Lignières, Lignières

=== Temporary circuits ===
- Lenzerheide Motor Classics, Lenzerheide

==== Defunct ====
- Bern Street Circuit, Bern

†	Formula One GP Venue; MotoGP GP Venue	Circuit Bremgarten, Bern

- Circuit de Meyrin, Meyrin
- Circuit de Porrentruy, Courtedoux

†	MotoGP GP Venue	Circuit des Nations, Geneva

- Circuito di Locarno, Locarno
- Circuit du Lac de Joux, Le Chenit
- Erlen Stadtkurs, Erlen
- Hittnau Circuit, Hittnau
- Lausanne Street Circuit, Lausanne
- Montreux Circuit, Montreux
- Zürich Street Circuit, Zürich

=== Hillclimbs ===
- Ayent-Anzère
- Gurnigel
- La Roche-La Berra
- St. Ursanne-Les Rangiers
- Memorial Bergrennen Steckborn-Eichhölzli
- Arosa ClassicCar - Langwies – Arosa
- Gempen Memorial
- Massongex – Verossaz
- St. Denis – Les Paccots
- Bergrennen Hemberg
- Bergrennen Reitnau
- Bergrennen Oberhallau
- Bergrennen Gurnigel
- Bergsprint Walzenhausen - Lachen

=== Defunct ===
- Klausenrennen

== Syria ==
- Syrian Automobile Club Circuit, Badda

== Taiwan ==
- Lihpao Racing Park, Taichung

=== Defunct ===
- Longtan National Speedway, Longtan
- Penbay International Circuit, Donggang

== Thailand ==
=== Permanent circuits ===
- Bira Circuit, Chonburi Province

†	MotoGP GP Venue	Chang International Circuit, Buriram Province

- Chiangrai Circuit Raceway Maelao, Mae Lao
- Kaeng Krachan Circuit, Phetchaburi Province
- Pathumthani Speedway, Pathum Thani Province
- Thailand Circuit, Nakhon Pathom Province

==== Under construction ====
- EEST NJT Racing Circuit, Chonburi Province
- Lopburi Speed Park, Lopburi Province

==== Defunct ====
- Bonanza International Circuit, Nakhon Ratchasima
- Watthana Nakhon Circuit, Watthana Nakhon

=== Temporary circuits ===
- Bangsaen Street Circuit, Chonburi
- Songkhla Street Circuit, Songkhla
- Uttaradit city street circuit Uttaradit

==== Defunct ====
- Bangkok Street Circuit, Bangkok
- Korat Circuit, Nakhon Ratchasima
- Prachuap Street Circuit, Prachuap Khiri Khan

== Trinidad and Tobago ==
- Wallerfield International Raceway, Cumuto

== Tunisia ==
=== Defunct ===
- Carthage Street Circuit, Tunis
- Circuito du Belvedere, Belvedere Park, Tunis
- Le Bardo Street Circuit, Le Bardo

== Turkey ==
=== Permanent circuits ===
- Autodrom Tuzla, Tuzla, Istanbul

†	Formula One GP Venue; MotoGP GP Venue	TOSFED İstanbul Park, Tuzla, Istanbul

- İzmit Körfez Circuit, Körfez
- Ülkü Park, İzmir

=== Temporary circuits ===
==== Defunct ====
- Hezarfen Airfield, Çatalca

== Turkmenistan ==
- Center Motorsport Turkmenistan, Ashgabat

== Ukraine ==
=== Permanent circuits ===
- Autodrome Chaika, Chaiky

==== Under construction ====
- Crimea Grand Prix Circuit, Suvorovske

=== Street circuits ===
- 6 km, Odesa
- Lvivskyi Triangle, Lviv

=== Permanent kart tracks ===
- Dnipro Kart, Kamianske
- Ltavaring, Poltava

=== Dirt tracks ===
- Autodrome Kosmichnyi, Balabyne
- Bakhmutskyi Shlyakh, Bakhmut
- Cherkaska Lozova, Cherkaska Lozova
- Dnepr Cross, Dnipro
- Kryvbas Extreme, Kryvyi Rih
- Supercross, Chernivtsi

=== Inactive tracks ===
- Galring, Lviv
- Moldovanka, Odesa
- Olimpiysky NSC, Kyiv
- Osokorky, Kyiv
- Peremohy Embankment, Dnipro
- Sykhivskyi Bridge, Lviv
- Yalita, Yalta

== United Arab Emirates ==
=== Permanent circuits ===
- Dubai Autodrome, Dubai

†	Formula One GP Venue	Yas Marina Circuit, Abu Dhabi (see also Abu Dhabi Grand Prix)

=== Temporary circuits ===
==== Defunct ====
- Dubai Motor Grand Prix Circuit, Dubai

== United Kingdom ==
=== Permanent circuits ===
- Aghadowey Race Circuit, Aghadowey, County Londonderry

†	Formula One GP Venue	Aintree Motor Racing Circuit, Aintree

- Anglesey Circuit, Aberffraw
- Bedford Autodrome, Bedfordshire
- Bishopscourt Racing Circuit, County Down
- Blyton Park Driving Centre, Blyton

†	Formula One GP Venue	Brands Hatch, Fawkham, Kent

- Cadwell Park, Lincolnshire
- Castle Combe Circuit, Castle Combe
- Croft Circuit, North Yorkshire

†	Formula One GP Venue; MotoGP GP Venue	Donington Park, Leicestershire

- East Fortune Race Circuit, East Lothian
- Goodwood Circuit, West Sussex
- Kirkistown Circuit, County Down
- Knockhill, Fife
- Llandow Circuit, Vale of Glamorgan
- Lydden Hill Race Circuit, Canterbury, Kent
- Mallory Park, Leicestershire
- Oliver's Mount, North Yorkshire
- Oulton Park, Cheshire
- Pembrey Circuit, Pembrey, Carmarthenshire
- Santa Pod Raceway, Podington, Bedfordshire

†	Formula One GP Venue; MotoGP GP Venue	Silverstone Circuit, Northamptonshire

- Snetterton Circuit, Norfolk
- Three Sisters Circuit, Three Sisters, Bryn
- Thruxton Circuit, Hampshire

==== Defunct ====
- Brooklands, Weybridge
- Crystal Palace Circuit, Crystal Palace
- Longridge Circuit, Preston
- Rockingham Motor Speedway, Corby

=== Temporary circuits ===
- Aberdare Park, Trecynon
- ExCeL London Circuit, London
- Ingliston Racing Circuit, Ingliston
- St. Angelo Circuit, Trory, County Fermanagh
- Tandragee, County Antrim
- The Triangle, County Londonderry
- Tonfanau, Gwynedd

==== Defunct ====
- Ards Circuit, Newtownards, County Down
- Armoy Race Circuit, Armoy
- Ballyclare Circuit, Ballyclare, County Antrim
- Bangor Circuit, Bangor, County Down
- Battersea Park Street Circuit, London
- Beveridge Park, Kirkcaldy
- Birmingham Superprix, Birmingham
- Blandford Circuit, Blandford
- Boreham Circuit, Chelmsford
- Catterick Circuit, North Yorkshire
- Charterhall Airfield, Duns

†	MotoGP GP Venue	Clady Circuit, County Antrim

- Cluntoe Airfield Circuit, County Tyrone
- Cranfield Circuit, County Down
- Davidstow Circuit, cornwall
- Donaghadee Circuit, Donaghadee, County Down

†	MotoGP GP Venue	Dundrod Circuit, County Antrim

- Dungannon Bush Road, Dungannon
- Fersfield, Diss
- Full Sutton Circuit, Yorkshire
- Gamston, Nottinghamshire
- Gransden Lodge Airfield, Cambridgeshire
- Ibsley Circuit, Hampshire
- Linton-on-Ouse, Yorkshire
- Long Kesh Circuit, Maze, County Down
- Lulsgate Aerodrome, Bristol
- Newtownards Circuit, Newtownards, County Down
- Ouston Airfield, Stamfordham
- Rufforth Airfield, Rufforth
- Winfield Airfield, Paxton
- Woodbridge Airfield, Woodbridge

=== Oval circuits ===
- Aldershot Raceway, Aldershot
- Central Park, Cowdenbeath, Fife
- Crimond Raceway, Crimond, Aberdeenshire
- Nutts Corner Raceway, Antrim
- Swaffham Raceway, Swaffham
- Tullyroan Oval, Armagh
- Ringwood Raceway, Hampshire

==== Defunct ====
- Ballymena Raceway, Ballymena, County Antrim

=== Hillclimb venues ===
- Barbon Hillclimb, Barbon
- Bo'ness Hill Climb, Bo'ness
- Cultra, Holywood
- Doune Hillclimb, Doune
- Eagle's Rock, Limavady
- Fintray, Aberdeenshire
- Forrestburn Hillclimb, Salsburgh
- Harewood speed Hillclimb, Harewood
- Goodwood Festival of Speed, Goodwood House
- Gurston Down Motorsport Hillclimb, Broad Chalke
- Loton Park Hill Climb, Loton Park
- Prescott Speed Hill Climb, Prescott
- Shelsley Walsh Speed Hill Climb, Shelsley Walsh
- MidCheshire Motor Racing Club Scammoden Hillclimb, Ripponden
- Tregrehan House, St Blazey
- Werrington Park Hill Climb, Werrington
- Wiscombe Park Hillclimb, Colyton

==== Defunct ====
- Baitings Dam, Ripponden
- Chateau Impney, Droitwich Spa
- Llys y Fran Hillclimb, Llys y Fran

=== Sprint venues ===
- Abingdon Airfield, Abingdon
- Bedford Autodrome, Thurleigh
- Chobham Test Track, Longcross
- Curborough Sprint Course, Curborough and Elmhurst
- Darley Moor Airfield, Derbyshire
- Debden Circuit, Saffron Walden
- Elvington Airfield, Elvington
- Grampian Transport Museum, Alford
- Hethel - Lotus Test Track, Hethel
- Kames Motorsport Circuit, Kames
- MIRA
- North of Scotland Kart Club, Golspie
- North Weald Airfield, Essex
- Top Gear test track, Dunsfold Aerodrome, Surrey

== United States ==
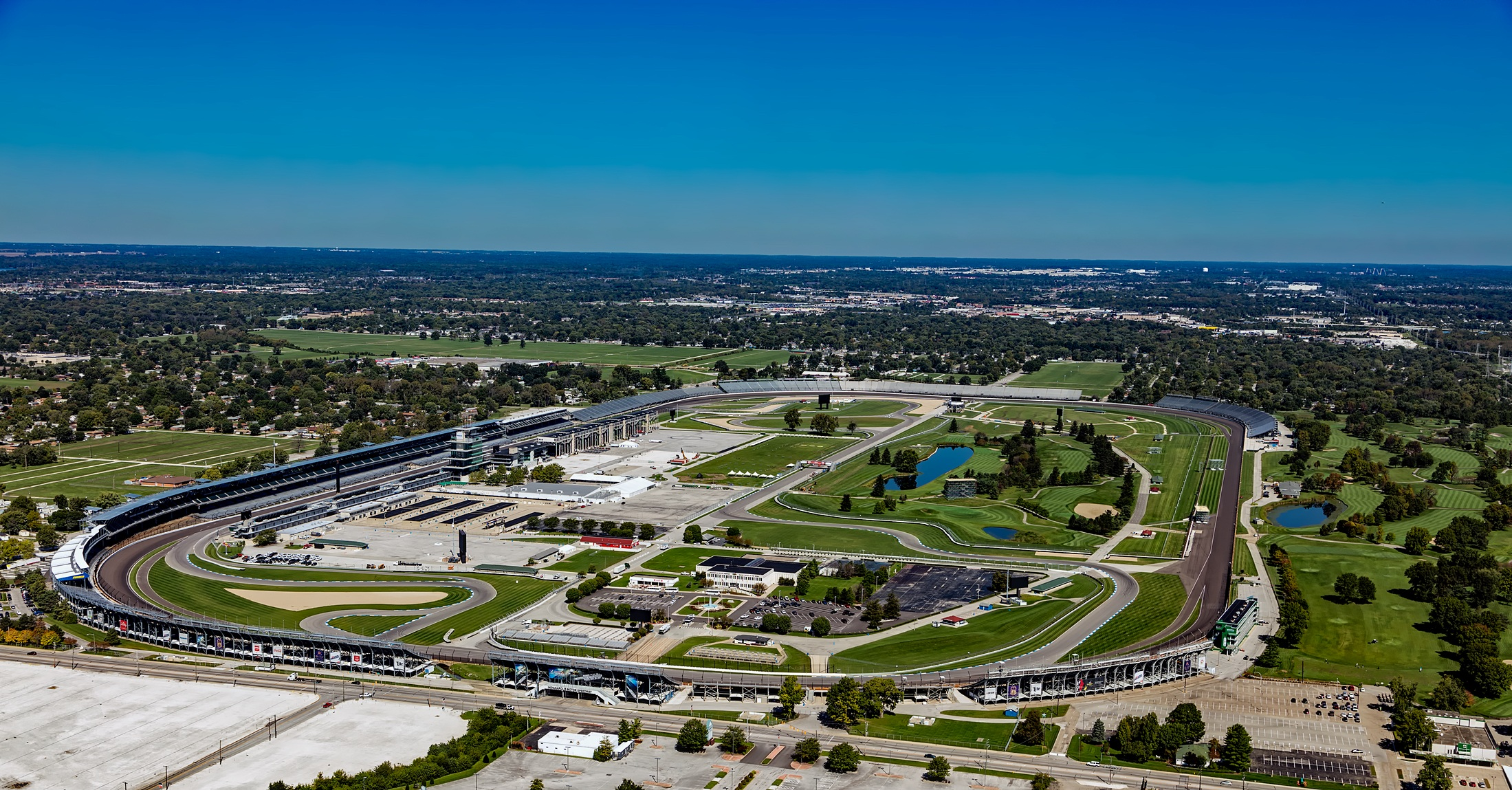
Indianapolis Motor Speedway

== Uruguay ==
=== Permanent circuits ===
- Autodromo de CAMS, Paysandú
- Autódromo Ciudad de Salto, Salto
- Autódromo Eduardo Prudêncio Cabrera, Rivera
- Autódromo Héctor Supicci Sedes, Tacuarembó
- Autódromo Víctor Borrat Fabini, El Pinar
- Polideportivo Ciudad de Mercedes, Mercedes

==== Defunct ====
- Autodromo Araoz Alfaro, Melo
- Autódromo de Punta Fría, Piriápolis

=== Temporary circuits ===
==== Defunct ====
- Circuito Urbano Real de San Carlos, Colonia del Sacramento
- Montevideo Street Circuit, Parque Rodó
- Piriapolis Street Circuit, Piriápolis
- Punta del Este Street Circuit, Punta del Este

== Uzbekistan ==
- Pskent Automotive Proving Ground, Tashkent Region

== Venezuela ==
=== Permanent circuits ===
- Autódromo Internacional Los Parisi, Zulia
- Autódromo Internacional Pancho Pepe Cróquer, Turagua, Aragua
- Autódromo Internacional Simón Bolívar, Bolívar

†	MotoGP GP Venue	San Carlos Circuit, San Carlos, Cojedes

=== Temporary circuits ===
==== Defunct ====
- Circuito Ciudad Satelite La Trinidad, Caracas
- Circuito de Lagunillas, Zulia

== Vietnam ==
- Dai Nam Race Track, Thủ Dầu Một
- Happy Land International Circuit, Long An

=== Defunct ===
- Hanoi Street Circuit, Hanoi

== Zambia ==
=== Permanent circuits ===
- Lawrence Allen Circuit, Chingola
- Ndola Motopark, Ndola

=== Dirt track ovals ===
==== Defunct ====
- Bennetts Speedway, Kitwe

== Zimbabwe ==
=== Permanent circuits ===
- Breedon Everard Raceway, Bulawayo
- Donnybrook Raceway, Harare

==== Defunct ====
- James McNeillie Circuit, Bulawayo

=== Temporary circuits ===
==== Defunct ====
- Belvedere Airport Circuit, Belvedere
- Heany Junction Circuit, Matabeleland North
- Saxon Wood Circuit, Mutare

== See also ==
- Road racing
- Street circuit
- Oval track racing
- List of motor racing venues by capacity
- List of motor racing circuits by FIA Grade
- Lists of sports venues
- Lists of stadiums
