= Tor Łódź =

Motorsport race track in Poland

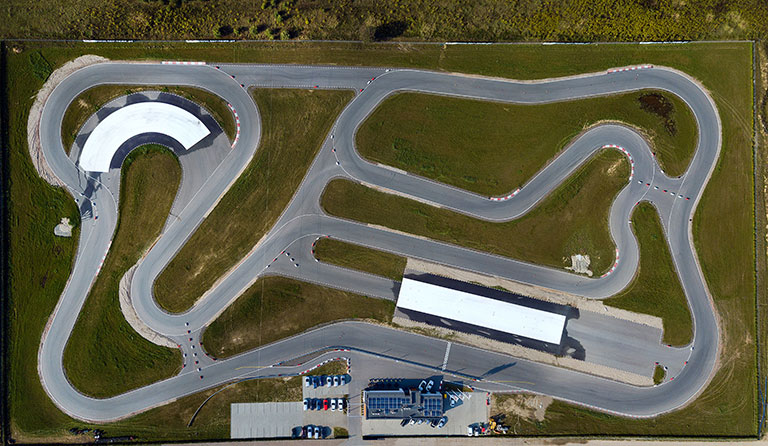
- Location: Kiełmina, Poland
- Coordinates: 52°25′04″N 16°48′21″E
- Opened: September 2016; 9 years ago
- Surface: Asphalt
- Length: 1.5 km

Tor Łódź is a motorsport race track located in the Kiełmina, Poland, a suburb of Łódź. It is the first Driving Technique Improvement Center (ODTJ) in the Łódź Voivodeship. It was entered into the ODTJ register by the Łódź Voivode in 2017 under the number 002E.

== Characteristics ==
Tor Łódź is located in a fenced area of 6 hectares, which also houses a building with a conference room and a café. The asphalt track itself is 1,500 m long, 8-12 m wide and consists of 17 curves, including a section of sprinkled curves and two skid plates: a rectangular one and a segment of the ring.a

At Tor Łódź, training courses are conducted to improve driving techniques for drivers of passenger cars from category B, B1 and for motorcyclists.
