= Nakayama Circuit =

Motor racing track in Okayama Prefecture, Japan

- Location: Wake District, Okayama Prefecture, West Japan
- Opened: 1970
- Length: 2.007 km (1.247 mi)
- Turns: 18

Nakayama Circuit is a 1.247 miles (2.007 km) circuit in 751 Ohnakayama, Wake-cho, Wake District, Okayama Prefecture in West Japan. Nakayama means “inside the mountain” in Japanese. It is located in the mountains like other Japanese motor racing tracks. The circuit is part of the quite compactly designed Sanyo Sports Land.

== History ==
The circuit opened in 1970 and as the fourth permanent motorsport facility in Japan to get full Japan Automobile Federation approval, after Suzuka Circuit, Fuji Speedway and Tsukuba Circuit. The kart track is within a few steps of the circuit. The back of the circuit grandstand is up against the first hairpin of the kart track.

The circuit was extended from 1.550 km (0.963 mi) to 2.007 km (1.247 mi) in 1998. It typically hosts a grassroots level of Japanese race events. Nakayama was the last circuit to hold FL500 races, in 1991, marking the end of this home-grown, entry-level formula series.

== Facilities ==
The circuit isn't as spectator-friendly as some of the newer and larger Japanese circuits. Since the circuit is wedged between the mountains, the pit area and the grandstand area are the two vantage points for spectators. 50% of the track can be seen from both vantage points with the opening radius right-hander in front of the grandstand and an ideal spot for overtaking at the final hairpin before the main straight.

No impact absorbing material or tires line the edge of the Armco barriers and, as such, the barriers are all bent out of shape. At the main straightaway, a 20-foot gap opens in the barrier halfway down with no impact absorbing material.

Even on a quiet day, the pit area is packed with kids running around and between cars. When cars are parked on both sides of the narrow pit area, only one car pass. The access tunnel to the pit area is narrow and low, barely wide enough for trucks.
