= Tipperary Raceway =

Motorsport racing circuit in Rosegreen, Ireland

Coordinates: 52.4676°N 7.7930°W

- Location: Rosegreen, County Tipperary E91 KV26, Ireland
- Opened: 1981
- Length: 0.402 km (0.250 miles)

The Tipperary Raceway is a short oval motorsport racing circuit in the Republic of Ireland, situated just outside the village of Rosegreen in County Tipperary. The raceway hosts a number of National Hot Rod Racing Championship rounds. Use of the raceway has intensified since its inception in 1981, from 5 hours a week up to 60 hours a week in 2007, sparking a legal action from nearby equine businesses.
