= Autódromo Internacional de Turagua Pancho Pepe Cróquer =

- Location: Turagua, Venezuela
- Coordinates: 10°08′18.27″N 67°30′29.47″W
- Opened: 1972
- Major events: Comecaminos VW Club de Caracas
- Website: http://www.autodromodeturagua.com/
- Length: 2.29 km (1.42 mi)
- Turns: 7

The Autódromo Internacional de Turagua Pancho Pepe Cróquer is a motor-racing venue in Venezuela, near Maracay. It was founded in 1972, and has a permanent closed circuit as well as a dragstrip. The circuit was named after Francisco José Cróquer, a distinguished sportscaster and racing driver who was popularly known as Pancho Pepe Cróquer.

== Sources ==
- Official website
- Turagua rFactor
- Wikimapia
- YouTube
