= Turagua =

- Location within Venezuela
- Coordinates: 10°08′32.75″N 67°30′39.14″W
- Time zone: UTC−4 (VET)

Turagua is a tiny town located in Aragua State, Venezuela.

== See also ==
- Autódromo Internacional de Turagua Pancho Pepe Cróquer

== Sources ==
- Pueblos de Venezuela: Turagua, Estado Aragua (Spanish)
- Wikimapia: Turagua, Venezuela
