= Kiełmina =

- Village
- Location within Poland
- Coordinates: 51°51′N 19°31′E
- Country: Poland
- Voivodeship: Łódź
- County: Zgierz
- Gmina: Stryków
- Population: 12

Kiełmina [kʲɛu̯ˈmina] is a village in the administrative district of Gmina Stryków, within Zgierz County, Łódź Voivodeship, in central Poland.
