= Hokkaido Speed Park =

Motor racing circuit

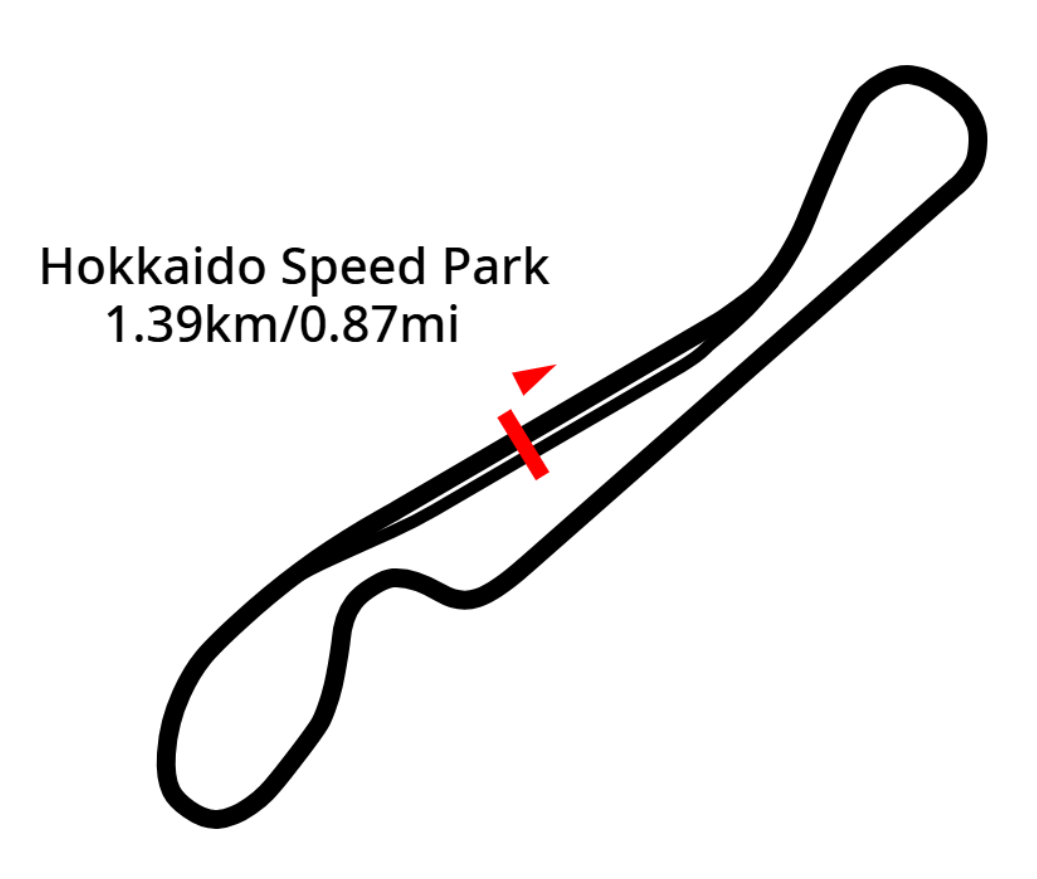
- Full Circuit (1985–2012)
- Location: Kutchan, Abuta District, Shiribeshi, Hokkaido, Japan
- Coordinates: 42°55′22.23″N 140°43′5.5″E
- Opened: 8 September 1985; 40 years ago
- Closed: 24 April 2012; 13 years ago

Full Circuit (1985–2012)
- Length: 1.389 km (0.868 miles)
- Turns: 6

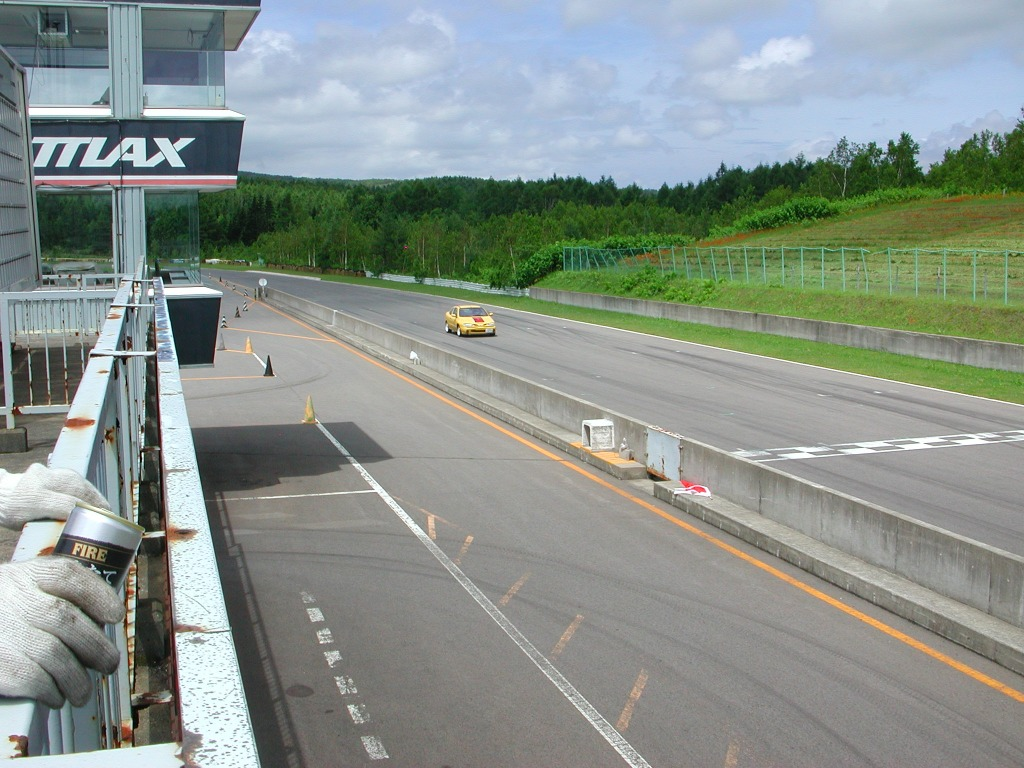
Hokkaido Speed Park in 2006

Hokkaido Speed Park was a 1.389 km (0.863 mi) motor racing circuit in 155 Tougeshita, Kutchan, Abuta District, Shiribeshi Subprefecture, on the island of Hokkaido, Japan. It was closed in 2012.
