= Autódromo Ciudad de Pigüé =

Motor racing circuit in Argentina

- Full Circuit (1979–present)
- Location: Pigüé, Buenos Aires, Argentina
- Coordinates: 27°29′39″S 55°10′40″W
- Opened: 2 July 1979; 46 years ago
- Major events: Former: TC2000 (1984–1989, 2002); Turismo Nacional (1985, 1990–1991, 2000–2013); Top Race V6 (2000–2001)

Full Circuit (1979–present)
- Length: 3.001 km (1.865 mi)
- Turns: 14
- Race lap record: 1:16.734 ( (Argentina) Leandro Carducci, Honda Civic VI, 2002, TC2000)

Second Variant (1979–present)
- Length: 2.298 km (1.428 mi)
- Turns: 10

Third Variant (1979–present)
- Length: 1.451 km (0.902 mi)
- Turns: 6

Autódromo Ciudad de Pigüé is a motor racing circuit located near Pigüé, in Buenos Aires Province, Argentina. It is a circuit that has hosted competitions Turismo Nacional, TC2000 and TC de Sudoeste. Circuit No. 1, has an extension of 3.001 km (1.865 mi) with 14 curves. The circuit was opened in July 1979.
