= Circuit de Dakar Baobabs =

Racing circuit in Senegal

6H of Dakar
- Location: Sindia, Thiès region, Senegal
- Coordinates: 14°35′32.6″N 17°1′21.46″W
- Owner: Paul Liebann
- Operator: Federation of Senegalese Automobile
- Opened: 2008
- Length: 4.700 km (2.920 mi)
- Turns: 21

The Circuit de Dakar Baobabs is a racing circuit located near the village of Sindia in Senegal.

It is the first permanent racing circuit of West Africa and homologated by the FIA in 2009. The track is used mainly for local races and championships, including the Dakar 6 hours race, organised for the 30th time in 2010.
