= Castlereagh International Dragway =

Defunct Australian drag racing venue

Coordinates: 33°40′26″S 150°41′8″E

Castlereagh International Dragway was a drag racing venue in the outer suburbs of Sydney, Australia used between 1947 and 1984. Originally an airstrip far away from residential development, as the urban sprawl came closer the land became more valuable as housing. Drag racers in Sydney then moved their activities to the 1000 foot strip at Oran Park Raceway.
