= Primring =

Motorsport complex in Artyom, Russia

- Location: Artyom, Primorsky Krai, Russia
- Coordinates: 43°21′28″N 132°04′56″E
- Opened: 2010
- Length: 1.23 km (0.76 mi)

The Primring (Russian: ТРК «Приморское Кольцо») is a motorsport complex located in Artyom, Primorsky Krai, Russia. It is listed as Grade Two by the FIA, and "Grade B" by the FIM. The project is being implemented within the FIA INSTITUTE Facility Development Program by SUMOTORI Technoholding in cooperation with English and Italian partners with the participation of the Primorsky Automobile Federation and the support of the FIA Automotive Safety Development Fund, as well as companies such as Apex Circuit Design Ltd. (Great Britain), Scott Wilson (UK) and RIDGE (UK).
