= Mildura TT Circuit =

Motor racing venue in Mildura, Victoria

Mildura Circuit
- Location: Mildura, Victoria
- Coordinates: 34°13′27″S 142°4′23″E
- Opened: 1954
- Closed: 1956
- Major events: Australian TT
- Length: 6.069 km (3.771 mi)
- Turns: 11
- Race lap record: 2:16 (Keith Campbell, 350cc Moto Guzzi, 1956, Australian TT)

The Mildura TT Circuit was a motor racing venue in Victoria, Australia, which was used for three motorcycle road racing events from 1954 to 1956. It was located next to Mildura Airport and ran along a section of the Sturt Highway. At the time, the six-kilometre long circuit was the fastest in Australia with an average speed of around 160-kilometres per hour and a main straight exceeding 1.6-kilometres in length.

The first race on the circuit was held on 26 December 1954, and was known as the Australian Road Race Grand Prix. Before the race could be held, the local council had to tar the back roads and create a hairpin to join them to the main straight. The hairpin became known as 'Taylor's Mistake' after a council road foreman originally constructed the hairpin fifty yards short of its intended location and the corner had to be relaid.

The circuit hosted its final race on Boxing Day in 1956. The Australian Olympic TT had originally been planned to be held at Little River near Melbourne but due to police refusing to sanction the event, it was moved to Mildura. As the organisers were finding it more and more difficult to pay for events, they decided to no longer hold meetings at the circuit after 1956. The final laps of the track were completed in 1970 when motorcyclist Bill Cowey rode around the track in a demonstration event.
