= Nasu Motor Sports Land =

Motor racing circuit in Japan

Coordinates: 36°58′9.73″N 140°7′41.33″E

- Location: 667-1 Aza Sakanoue, Terako, Nasushiobara, Tochigi Prefecture, Japan
- Opened: 1989/ Reopened 2006
- Closed: 2004 (once)
- Length: 1.146 km (0.72 miles)
- Turns: 12

Nasu Motor Sports Land is a 0.72mile (1.146 km) motor racing circuit 667-1 Aza Sakanoue, Terako, Nasushiobara, Tochigi Prefecture 325-0011, East Japan.
