= Mariánské Lázně Longtrack Speedway =

Speedway stadium in Mariánské Lázně, Czech Republic

- Interactive map of Mariánské Lázně Longtrack Speedway
- Location: Plzeňská 705/9, 353 01 Mariánské Lázně 1-Úšovice, Czech Republic
- Coordinates: 49°57′20″N 12°42′18″E

Mariánské Lázně Longtrack Speedway is a longtrack and former motorcycle speedway venue in Mariánské Lázně, Czech Republic. The stadium is located in the centre of the town, off the Plzeňská road.

== History ==
The track is best known for longtrack and has been a major venue for the longer form of speedway. It hosted the final of the Individual Speedway Long Track World Championship in 1976, 1979, 1983, 1989, 1991 and 1994.

Since the introduction of the Grand Prix series in 1997, the track has been selected multiple times to hold a round of the series. The most recent being 2011.

The site previously held conventional speedway and was chosen to host a final round of the Czechoslovak Individual Speedway Championship from 1954 to 1956.
