= SPA Naoiri =

Motorcycle racing circuit in Japan

Coordinates: 33°06′07″N 131°24′34″E

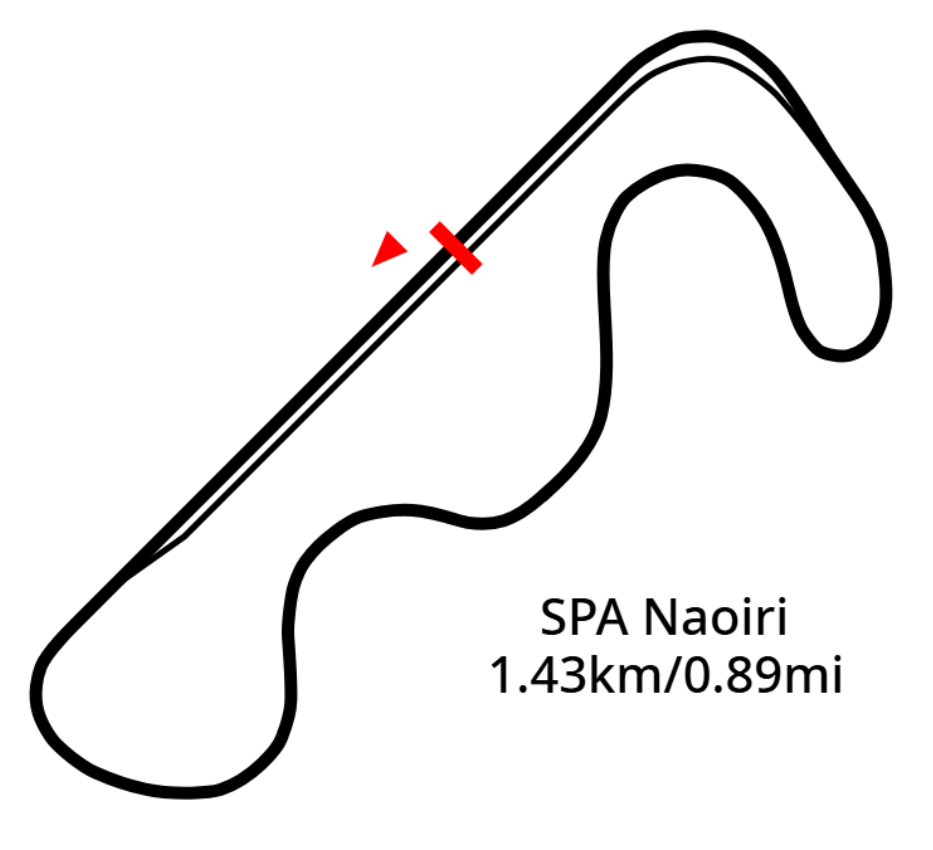
- Location: Taketa, Ōita Prefecture, West Japan
- Owner: Kawasaki Motors Corporation Japan
- Operator: Autopolis Co., Ltd.
- Opened: 1990
- Length: 1.430 km (0.889 miles)
- Turns: 8

SPA Naoiri is a 1.430 km (0.889 mi) motorcycle racing circuit in 510-15 Ueda Kita Urahara, Taketa, Ōita Prefecture 878-0403, West Japan. The circuit is owned by Autopolis Co., Ltd. (part of Kawasaki Heavy Industries), which also operated the Autopolis racing track. The off-road course was closed in March 2012.
