= Mount Noro Speed Park =

Race circuit in Kure, Hiroshima, Japan

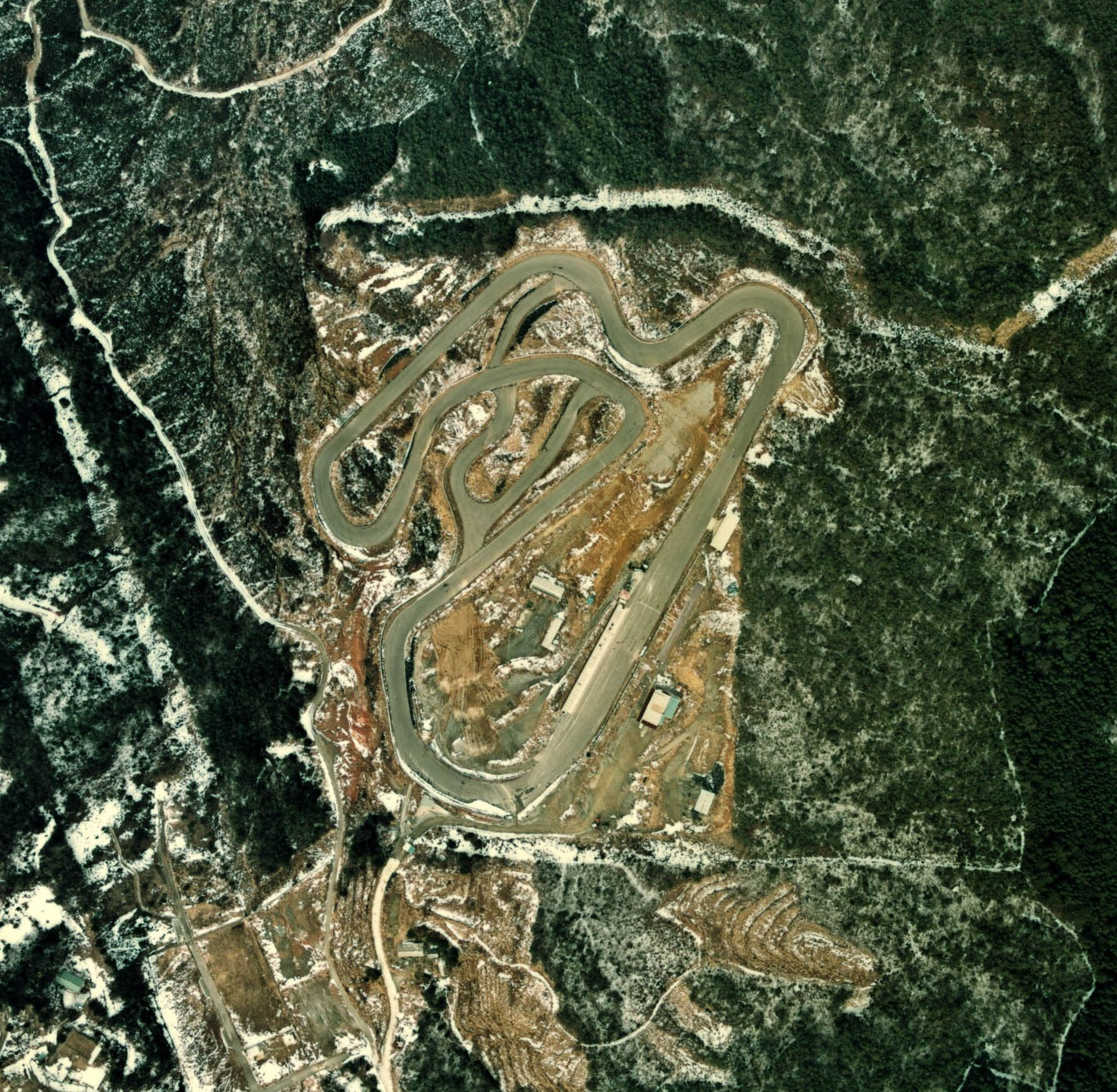
- The circuit in an 1974 aerial photo
- Location: Kure, Hiroshima, Hiroshima Prefecture, Japan
- Coordinates: 34.269072°N 132.675667°E
- Opened: 19 October 1969; 56 years ago
- Closed: 1974; 52 years ago
- Major events: All Japan Stock Car Kure 200km

Full Course
- Length: 1.300 km (0.808 mi)

Stock Course
- Length: 0.932 km (0.579 mi)

The Mount Noro Speed Park (野呂山スピードパーク) was a race circuit in Kure, Hiroshima, Hiroshima Prefecture, Japan, active between 1970 and 1974.

The track was completed in late 1969 and hosted its first race in early 1970. The circuit was rather unusual in that it had such large elevation change over such a short distance (1.35 km). Racing on the circuit continued until 1974 when noise complaints and the after-effects of the 1973 oil crisis forced the circuit to close. The track has since been mostly demolished, but the main straight and some buildings, such as the main grandstand, still remain, though closed to public access.
