= Jeddah Raceway =

Jeddah Raceway is a motor racetrack in Jeddah, Saudi Arabia. The project was approved by Prince Sultan bin Abdulaziz in 2006. It is home to the Jeddah Racing Academy, which opened in 2008.

== Location ==
Jeddah Raceway is in King Abdullah Sports City in the Al-Asalah district of northern Jeddah, between King Abdulaziz International Airport and South Obhur Beach.
