= Waterford Raceway =

Oval motorsport race track near Dungarvan, Ireland

Coordinates: 52.125050°N 7.560208°W

- Location: Dungarvan, Ireland
- Opened: 1970s
- Length: 0.537 km (0.334 mi)

The Waterford Raceway (also known as the pike!) is a 1/3 mile tarmac oval motorsport race track off the main Waterford—Cork road near Dungarvan, Ireland. The motor racing circuit was opened in the 1970s and hosted hot rod racing. It is open from March to December every year with a race meeting approximately once a month and with a Christmas meeting on Stephen's day. There are many classes of cars racing each day from first level junior drivers in 1 litre cars up to a top level 3.5 litre super car class. Junior drivers can race from the age of ten in restricted car's.

Each meeting classes race for the days trophies and cups and also for championship points in a year long battle to become top of each class with the overall winner being crowned king/queen of the pike.
