= Mšeno Speedway Stadium =

Stadium in Mšeno, Czech Republic

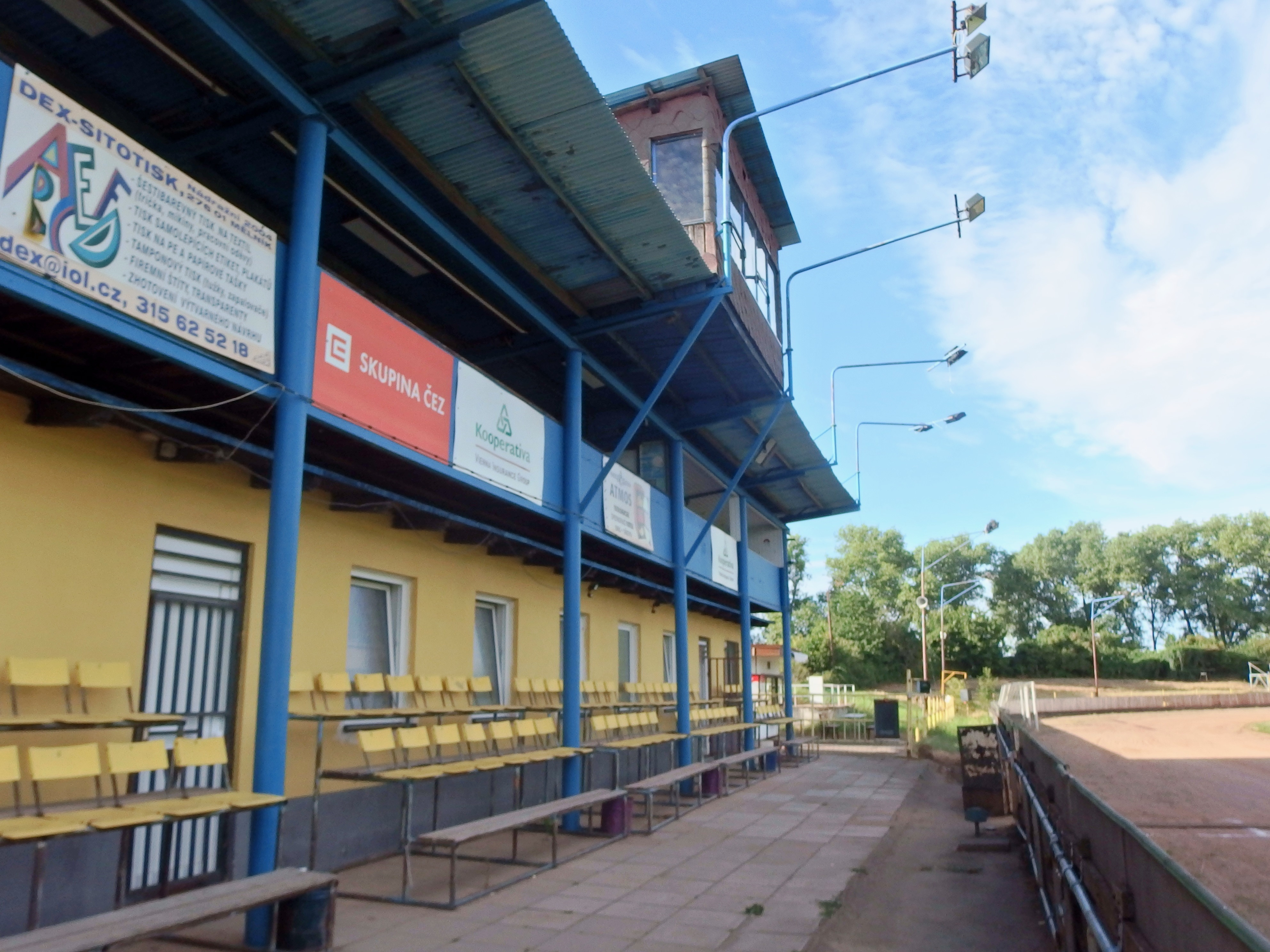
- The stadium in 2018
- Location: Boleslavská, 259 398, Mšeno, Czech Republic
- Coordinates: 50°26′07″N 14°38′56″E
- Opened: 1957
- Length: 0.354 km (0.220 mi)

Mšeno Speedway Stadium (Czech: Plochodrážní stadion Mšeno) is a motorcycle speedway track in Mšeno, Czech Republic. It is located on the eastern edge of the town, off the Boleslavská road. The stadium is used by PDK Mšeno club (speedway) and SK Mšeno (football).

== History ==
Construction of the stadium began in 1956. Initially, the facility was to have an athletics track, but during construction the plans were changed and instead of athletics, a speedway track was built around the football pitch. The first competition at the facility was held in 1957.

The stadium was selected as the venue for a qualifying round of the 1964 Individual Speedway World Championship.

By the end of the 1960s, the track was abandoned but was brought back to life in the 1970s by the speedway riders of Rudá Hvězda Praha, whose Markéta Stadium was being renovated. Ruda Hvězda, together with the local TJ Sokol Mšeno, organised competitions at this stadium until the 1990s.

It was not until 1993 that the first Mšeno team raced at the track, when private investor, Jiří Opočenský (a former national cyclocross athlete) created a new speedway team called Oliba Mšeno, named after his local bicycle manufacturing company Oliba.

In 1997, the final of the 1997 Speedway Under-21 World Championship was held on the track. However, in the same year (1997), Oliba Mšeno ceased its activities.

A new speedway team was created in 1999 at the SK Mšeno club.

In 2005, the final of the 2005 Individual Speedway Junior European Championship was held in the arena.

== Gallery ==
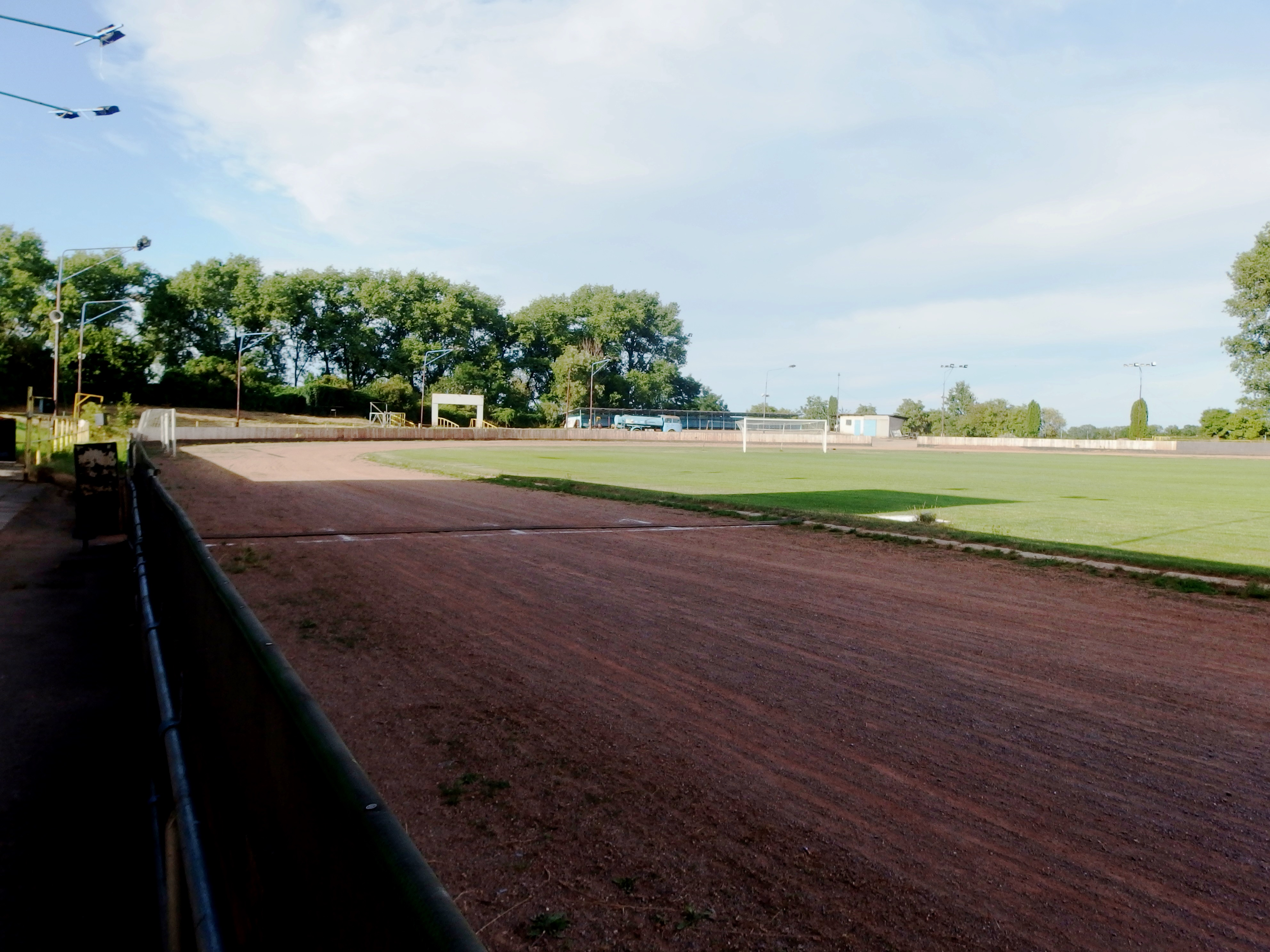

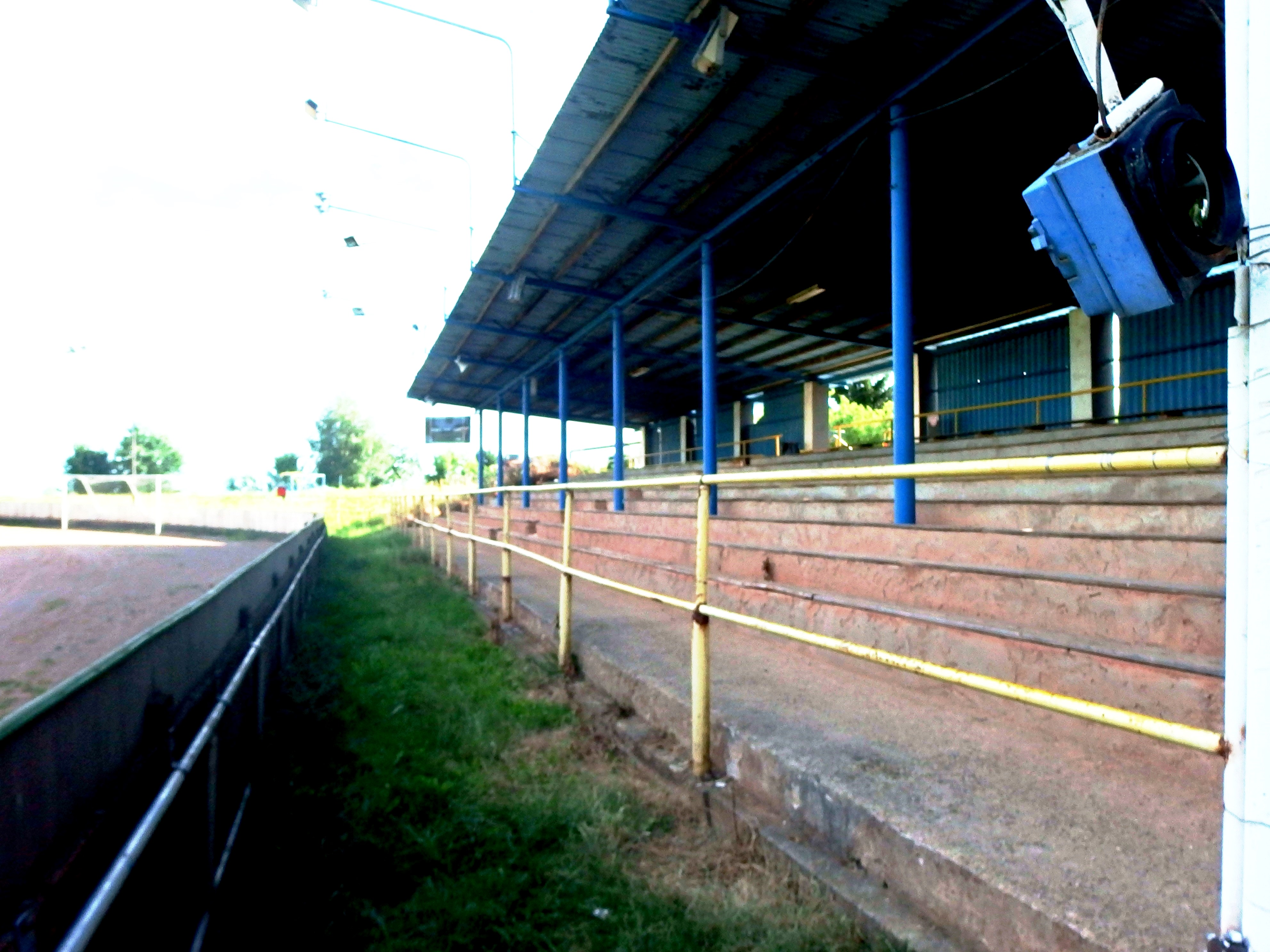

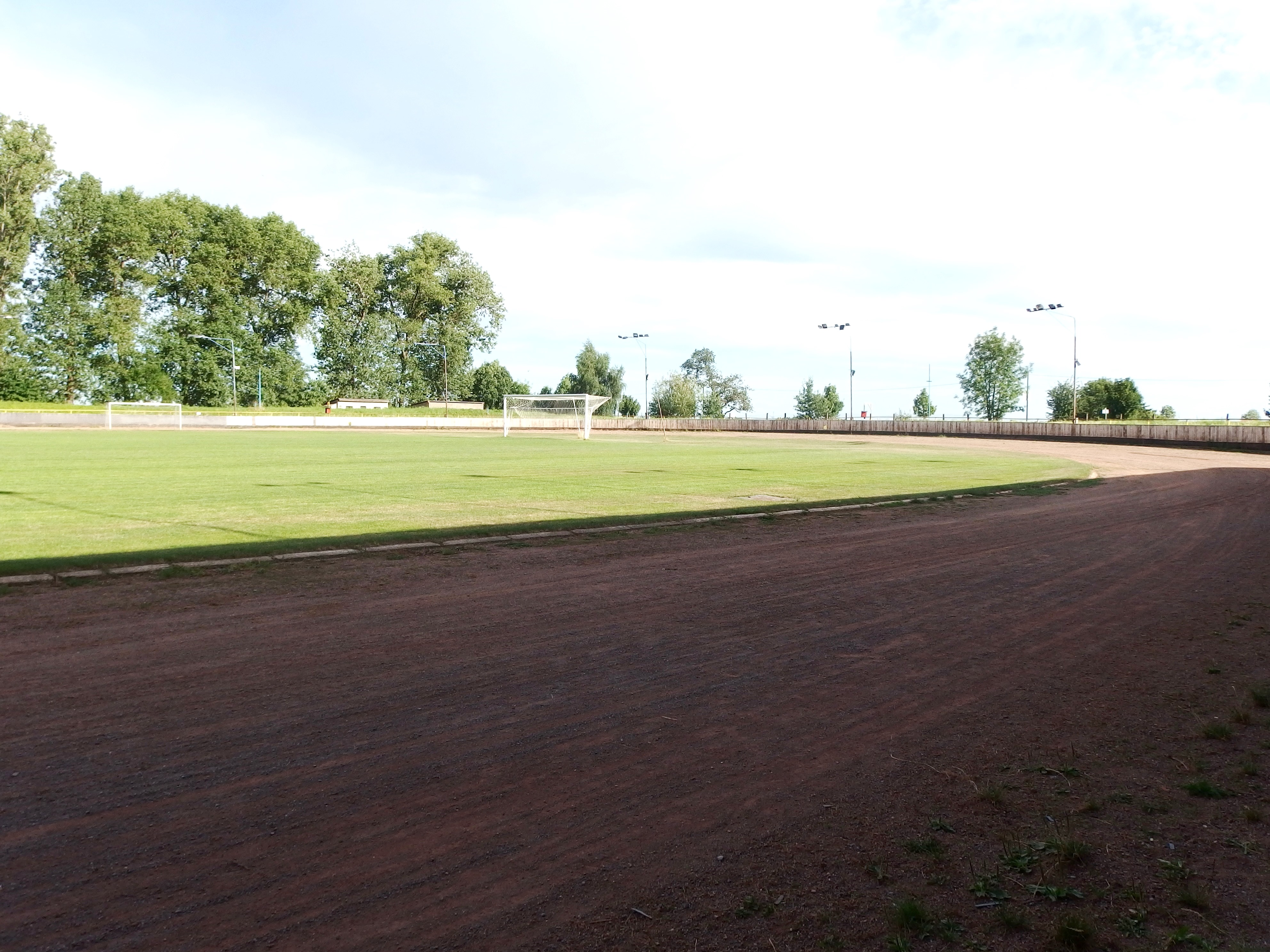

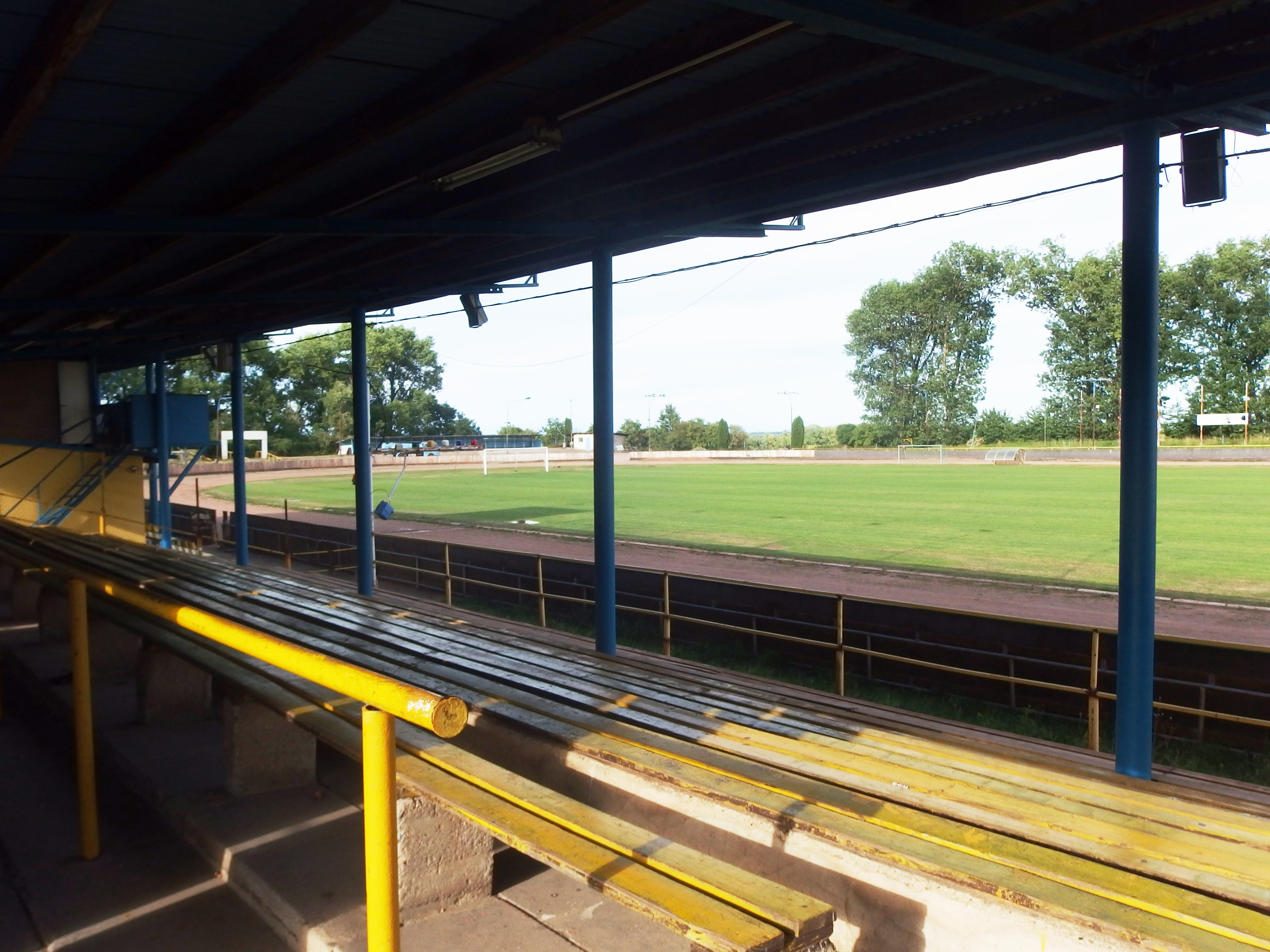
