= PK Plzeň =

Czech motorcycle speedway team

Club information
- Track address: Plzeň speedway track
- Country: Czech Republic
- League: Czech league
- Website: www.pkplzen.cz

Major team honours
| Extraliga champion | 1994, 2007 |
| Extraliga runner-up | 2006 |
| Czechoslovak league runner-up | 1958, 1974 |

Plochodrážní klub v AČR Plzeň is a Czech motorcycle speedway team based in Plzeň, Czech Republic. The team race at the Plzeň speedway track.

== History ==
The team competed in the inaugural Czechoslovak Team Speedway Championship during 1956, finishing third in the league. At the time they carried the name KAMK Plzeň but in 1959 they were known as KV Zvazarmu Plzeň, following their connection with Svazarm.

When the league was reformed in 1967 following a four-year break, the team returned as ČSAD (Czechoslovak State Automobile Transportation) Plzeň from 1983 to the Dissolution of Czechoslovakia.

The team continued as ČSAD Plzeň, competing in the Czech Republic Team Speedway Championship until 1994, when they received dual sponsorship from Cetrans and Marco Polo. It was a catalyst for their first Championship success in the club's history and ended 24 years of dominance by the Prague and Pardubice clubs.

The club won a second extraliga in 2007 under the name PK Plzeň and continue to race under that name with the exception of a couple of merged years in 2012 and 2016 when they raced with Divišov and Brezolupy teams.
