= Military University Department (Czechoslovakia) =

A military department (Czech: vojenská katedra, plural vojenské katedry) was a part of every civilian university in Czechoslovakia from 1951 to 1990. Their goal was to provide basic military training to all male students eligible of army service.

Mandatory military training at the universities was mandated on August 8, 1951, military departments were mandated on October 1, 1951, and set up within few years at every university. Typically, for 4 years (later 2 years) one day in a week was dedicated to military training. Two military exercises (one month during the summer each) were held after 2nd and 4th year. After successful exams the students obtained minor military rank and their future mandatory military service was reduced to one year (the others served for two years). Exempted were those who took the military service prior the study, those unfit for the service for health reason and women.

The departments were subordinated to the university rectors and to the Ministry of Defense for military specific tasks. They were staffed by army officers, sometimes as a punishment for drinking or incompetence, sometimes by those near retirement. The institution was universally loathed by the students.

During the student strike in November–December 1989 (part of Velvet Revolution events) the military training stopped and it was largely ignored by students afterwards. In March 1990 the length of mandatory military service was reduced to 18 months (in July 1993 again to 12 months) and alternative civil service was established. The parliament discussed abolishing the departments during March 1990. All departments were officially liquidated on September 30, 1990.

== Similar institutions ==
The first law mandating universal semi-military training was passed in 1937 as a response to threats by Nazi Germany. During rule of communist party in Czechoslovakia (1948–1989) some forms of semi-military training were provided by primary and secondary schools. Svazarm was the largest paramilitary organisation of the era. People's Militias was paramilitary organisation composed by members of Communist Party of Czechoslovakia.
