= Trade Union Stadium =

Former stadium in Ostrava, Czechoslovakia

- Interactive map of Trade Union Stadium
- Location: Novinářská 3178/6, 702 00 Ostrava, Czechoslovakia
- Coordinates: 49°49′59″N 18°15′57″E
- Capacity: 60,000

Construction
- Opened: 1954
- Closed: 1976
- Demolished: c. 1999

Trade Union Stadium (Czech: Stadion odborářů) was a 60,000 capacity multi-use stadium in Ostrava in today's Czech Republic. It was located where the Futurum shopping center is today.

== History ==
In the early 1950s, it was discussed that a large public sports field would need to be built for the ever-growing Ostrava. The plan would require tennis and volleyball courts, a sports hall for ball games and a swimming pool. In addition, the sports ground was to be dominated by one of the largest stadiums in Czechoslovakia (for 60,000 spectators), which would later be named the Stadion odborářů (Trade Union Stadium). The location chosen was a former brick factory on the border of Mariánské Hory and Fifejda.

The construction began in 1952 to be ready for the Spartakiad in 1955. The architect of the stadium was Rudolf Šajdek. The stands could accommodate 60,000 spectators, making the stadium the second largest in Czechoslovakia (after the Strahov Stadium). On 26 September 1954, the first motorcycle speedway races were held in the stadium and the Spartakiad was held there in 1955 and 1960.

A qualifying round of the Speedway World Championship was held in the stadium in 1962, 1975 and 1976.

Speedway competitions finished in September 1976 and afterwards the stadium fell into disrepair. During the 1980s and 1990s, plans surfaced to modernise the stadium but they came to nothing. The stadium was demolished at the end of the 1990s, and in its place the development company of Libor Adámek built the Futurum shopping center in May 2000.

== Ostrava speedway team ==
The Ostrava speedway team first competed in the Czechoslovak Team Speedway Championship during 1957 and as KAMK Ostrava won the 2.Liga. The team adopted the Svazarm prefix before the North Moravian name was also added. The team won a second 2.Liga title in 1961 before competing for one final season in 1962.
