= Prague Speedway =

Speedway in Prague

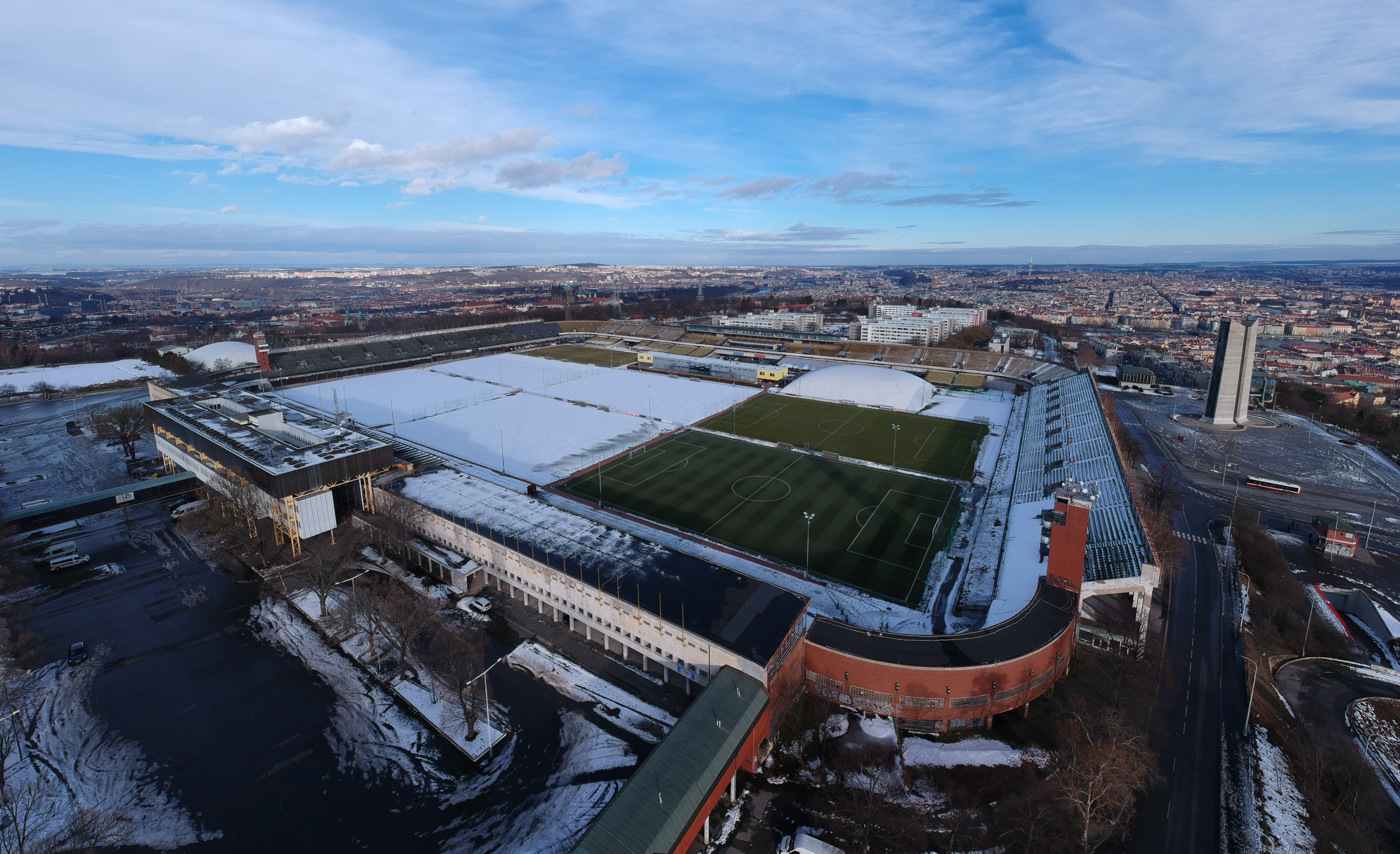
- The Great Strahov Stadium hosted speedway from 1933 to 1973

Prague Speedway has consisted of several former motorcycle speedway teams and stadia and the current team known as AK Markéta Praha, who race at the Markéta Stadium.

== History ==
=== 1928 to 1992 ===
The origins of speedway in Prague can be traced back to races held at the Stadion Letná, starting on 9 June 1928 and these were soon followed by meetings at the Great Strahov Stadium on 14 May 1933 and the Žižkov TJ Sokol Stadium on 11 April 1934.

Following the end of World War II, the Czechoslovak military began forming sports teams and regional and national competitions. In 1953, a law (following the Soviet model) determined that all clubs should be voluntary sports societies, with athletes being allocated to clubs according to their civic occupations. The first Czechoslovak Team Speedway Championship was held in 1956 and featured two teams from Prague, Rudá Hvězda Praha (Red Star Prague), associated with the Czechoslovak police force and KAMK Prague, who were based at the ČAFC stadium in Spořilov. The two teams finished first and second respectively in the inaugural league season. Red Star then dominated the league during the period 1957 to 1962, when many teams carried the Svazarm prefix to their club names.

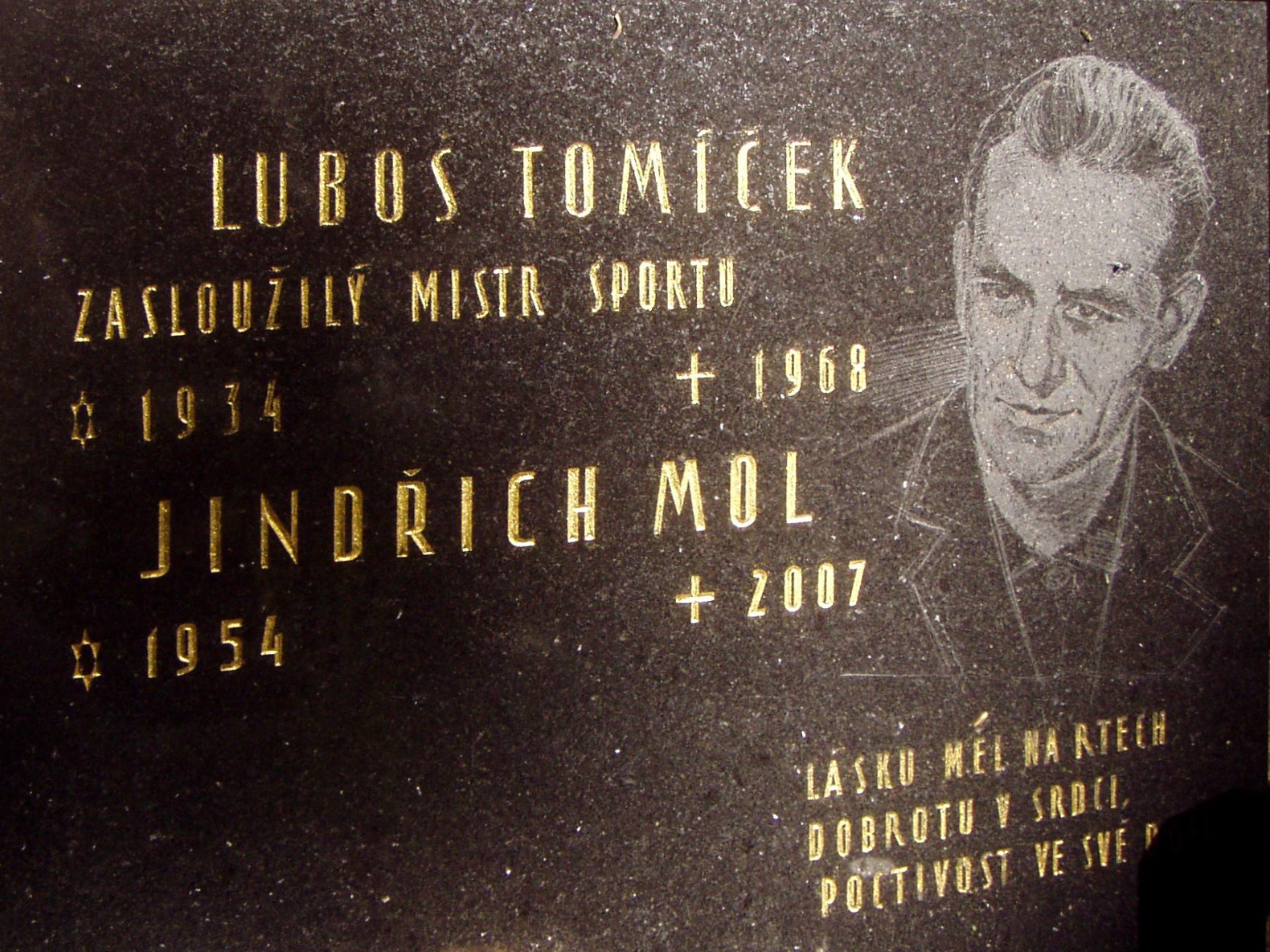
Grave of Luboš Tomíček Sr., five times champion of Czechoslovakia as a Red Star Prague rider

Despite the league competition ending in 1963, the Czechoslovak Individual Championship continued and Red Star rider Luboš Tomíček Sr. was the county's leading rider, winning five consecutive titles. Additionally the first World Championship event held in Prague was a continental qualifying round during the 1963 Individual Speedway World Championship, held at the Great Strahov Stadium on 9 May.

In 1965 and 1966, the FK Viktoria Stadion held speedway, used by the Victoria Speedway Club Praha (VSC). VSC was the new name for the Prague team that raced primarily at Spořilov again from 1967 and included riders such as Antonín Kasper Sr., František Ledecký, Václav Verner and Bohumír Bartoněk. When the league restarted in 1967, VSC emerged as the new champions but the Red Star team began to dominate again the following season and VSC were homeless by 1970.

In 1971, VSC found a new home at Letňa Avia in Čakovice and were called Zizkov Prague before taking the name AMK Čakovice in the late 1970s. The venue also hosted a final round of the Czechoslovak Individual Championship eight times from 1973 to 1983. Meanwhile, the city's Red Star team based at the Markéta Stadium continued to dominate all competition and continually won the league title. It was not until the fall of Real socialism in the Eastern Bloc countries, that clubs began to choose names of their own, Red Star became Olymp Praha and then much later AK Markéta Praha.

=== After Dissolution ===
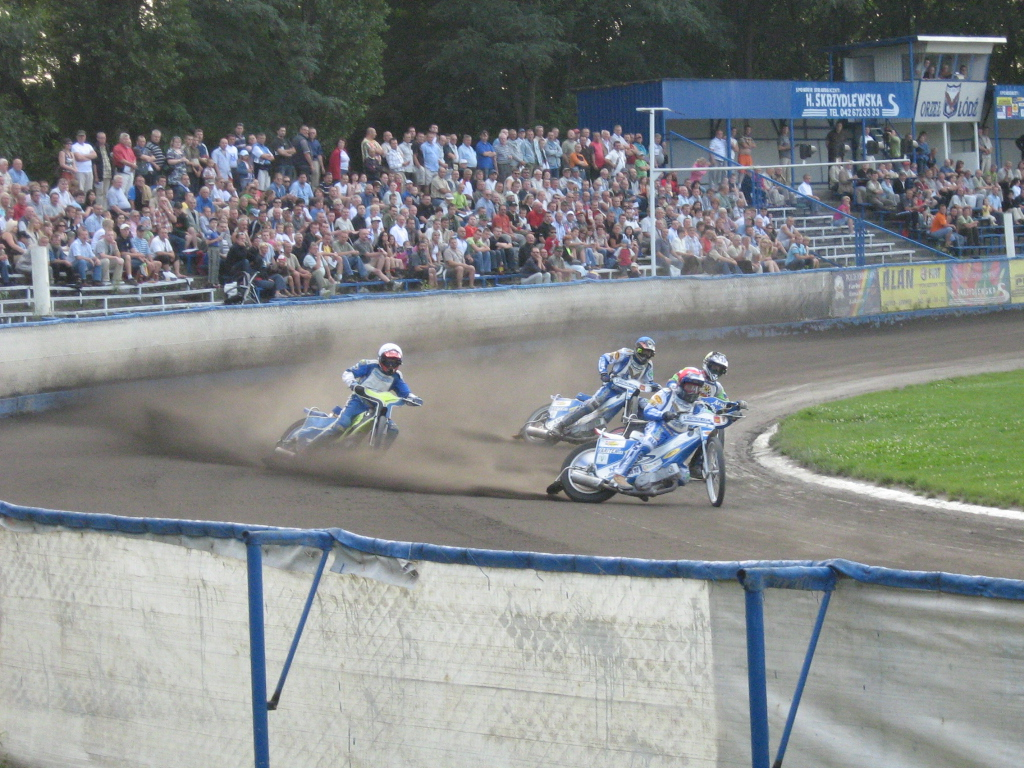
AK Markéta Praha racing in the Polish league during 2007

Following the Dissolution of Czechoslovakia the Czech Republic Team Championship began in 1992. AMK Čakovice competed during 1992 and 1993 but then folded and the Letňa Avia became solely a football ground.

The demise of the Čakovice club left the Markéta Stadium as the sole remaining speedway venue in Prague. The Great Strahov Stadium had last hosted speedway on 2 September 1973, the ČAFC stadium in Spořilov had been demolished to make way for a road and the Stadion Letná and FK Viktoria Stadion had long since removed their speedway tracks.

As the only Prague club, AK Markéta Praha continue to compete strongly in the Czech Republic Extraliga, winning the league in 2022.
