= AMK Zlatá Přilba Pardubice =

Czech motorcycle speedway team

Club information
- Track address: Svítkov Stadium
- Country: Czech Republic
- Founded: 1956
- League: Czech Extraliga
- Website: www.zlataprilba.cz

Club facts
- Nickname: Golden Helmet
- Track size: 400 metres

Major team honours
Extraliga champion (x11)	1999, 2001, 2002, 2004, 2008, 2013, 2015, 2016, 2018, 2021, 2023
Czechoslovak league champion (x4)	1978, 1982, 1984, 1989
Extraliga runner-up (x13)	1992, 1995, 1997, 1998, 2000, 2005, 2007, 2009, 2011, 2012, 2014, 2017, 2020
Czechoslovak league runner-up (x10)	1957, 1979, 1980, 1981, 1983, 1985, 1986, 1987, 1990, 1991

Automotoklub Zlatá Přilba Pardubice is a Czech motorcycle speedway team based in Pardubice, Czech Republic. The club take its name Zlatá Přilba after the prestigious competition known as the Golden Helmet of Pardubice.

== History ==
The team race at the Svítkov Stadium and were four-times champions of the former Czechoslovakia. The team started life known as KAMK Pardubice before taking the Golden Helmet name.

However, in 1983 the stadium became a centre for the Svazarm and the site was known as a centre of professional sports. The team raced as SVS (Středisko vrcholového sportu) Pardubice from 1983 to 1990 before reverting to their chosen name.

Pardubice and Rudá Hvězda Praha (Red Star Prague) dominated Czechoslovak speedway from 1978 until the Dissolution of Czechoslovakia.

AMK Zlatá Přilba Pardubice continued to compete in the Extraliga and became eleven-times champions of the Czech Republic at the end of 2023.
