= František Ledecký =

Czech speedway rider (1940–2025)

- Born: 3 November 1940; Protectorate of Bohemia and Moravia
- Died: 18 September 2025 (aged 84)
- Nationality: Czech

Career history

Czechoslovakia
- 1958–1962: KAMK Praha
- 1967–1967: VSC Praha
- 1968–1971: Rudá Hvězda Praha

Individual honours
- 1969: Czechoslovak Championship silver

František Ledecký (3 November 1940 – 18 September 2025) was a Czech motorcycle speedway rider. He was capped by the Czechoslovak national speedway team.

== Biography ==
Ledecký began his speedway career training at the ČAFC stadium in the Spořilov area of Prague. He started racing in 1958 for KAMK Prague.

Ledecký represented the national team during the Continental Final round of the 1964, 1968 and 1969 Speedway World Team Cups.

In 1967, Ledecký was part of the Prague team that toured the United Kingdom.

In 1968, Ledecký won the bronze medal at the Golden Helmet of Pardubice and the following year won the silver medal at the 1969 Czechoslovak Individual Speedway Championship. Additionally in 1969, he reached the final of the 1969 Individual Long Track European Championship. It was also during 1969 that he arranged to ride for Coventry Bees, while leading the Czech international team touring the United Kingdom but a deal could not be finalised.

After retirement, Ledecký worked as a team coach until 1991.

Ledecký died on 18 September 2025, at the age of 84.
