= PDK Mšeno =

Czech motorcycle speedway team

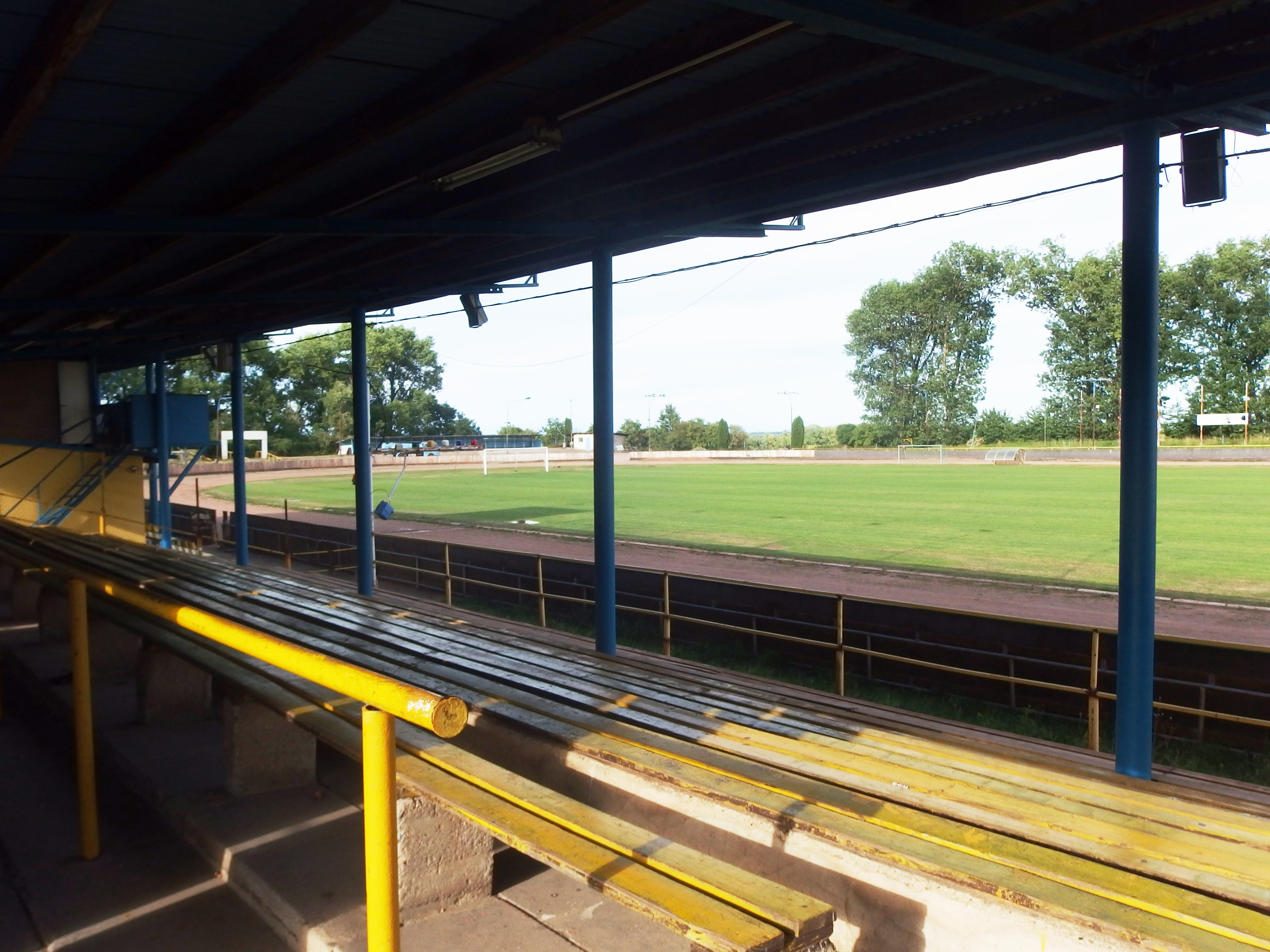
- Mšeno Speedway Stadium

Club information
- Track address: Mšeno Speedway Stadium
- Country: Czech Republic
- Founded: 1993
- League: Czech Extraliga
- Website: pdkmseno.net

Club facts
- Track size: 354 metres

Major team honours
Extraliga champion (x3)	2009, 2010, 2011
Extraliga runner-up (x1)	2008

Plochodrážní klub Mšeno v AČR is a Czech motorcycle speedway team based in Mšeno, Czech Republic. The team race at the Mšeno Speedway Stadium.

== History ==
The origins of speedway in Mšeno began with the construction of the Mšeno Stadium in 1956, which included a speedway track around the outside of the football pitch and it was first used in 1957. In 1986, there was a failed attempt to bring a Mšeno–Býkev team to the stadium.

It was not until 1993 that a private investor, Jiří Opočenský (a former national cyclocross athlete) created a new speedway team called Oliba Mšeno, named after his local bicycle manufacturing company Oliba. The team raced in the second division known as 1.Liga and won it in 1994.

In 1997, the team folded and then the company Oliba collapsed but in 1999, speedway returned with new ownership and a new team known as SK Mšeno. The club under the control of Rudolf Grepl, finished second in the Czech Republic Team Speedway Championship before winning three consecutive national titles from 2009 until 2011. Greg Hancock was instrumental in helping the team claim such success.

In recent years finances have been an issue, but the team continue to compete as PDK Mšeno.
