= Březolupy Speedway =

Czech motorcycle speedway team and track

Coordinates: 49°7′13.27″N 17°34′41.91″E

AK Březolupy
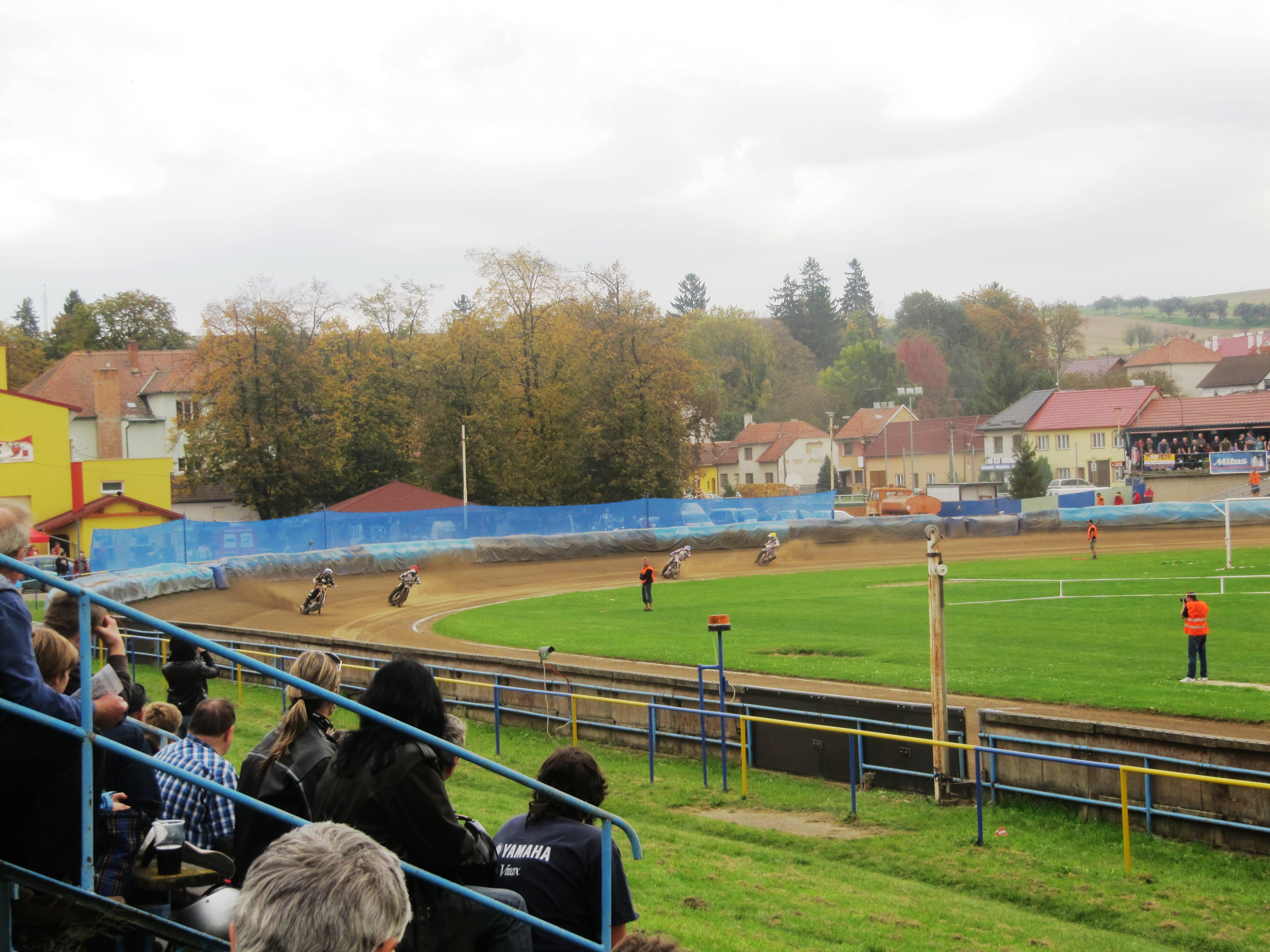
- Czech individual final at Březolupy during 2014

Club information
- Track address: Plochá dráha Březolupy
- Country: Czech Republic
- Founded: 1961
- League: Czech league
- Website: autoklub.brezolupy.cz/subdom/autoklub/

Club facts
- Track size: 381 metres

Major team honours
Extraliga runner-up	1996
Extraliga bronze	1995, 1997, 1999

Březolupy Speedway is the motorcycle speedway club known as Autoklub Březolupy and the track known as the Plochá dráha Březolupy, which hosts the club. The track is located in the centre of Březolupy in the Czech Republic, off the Březolupy 497. The track surrounds a football pitch.

== History ==
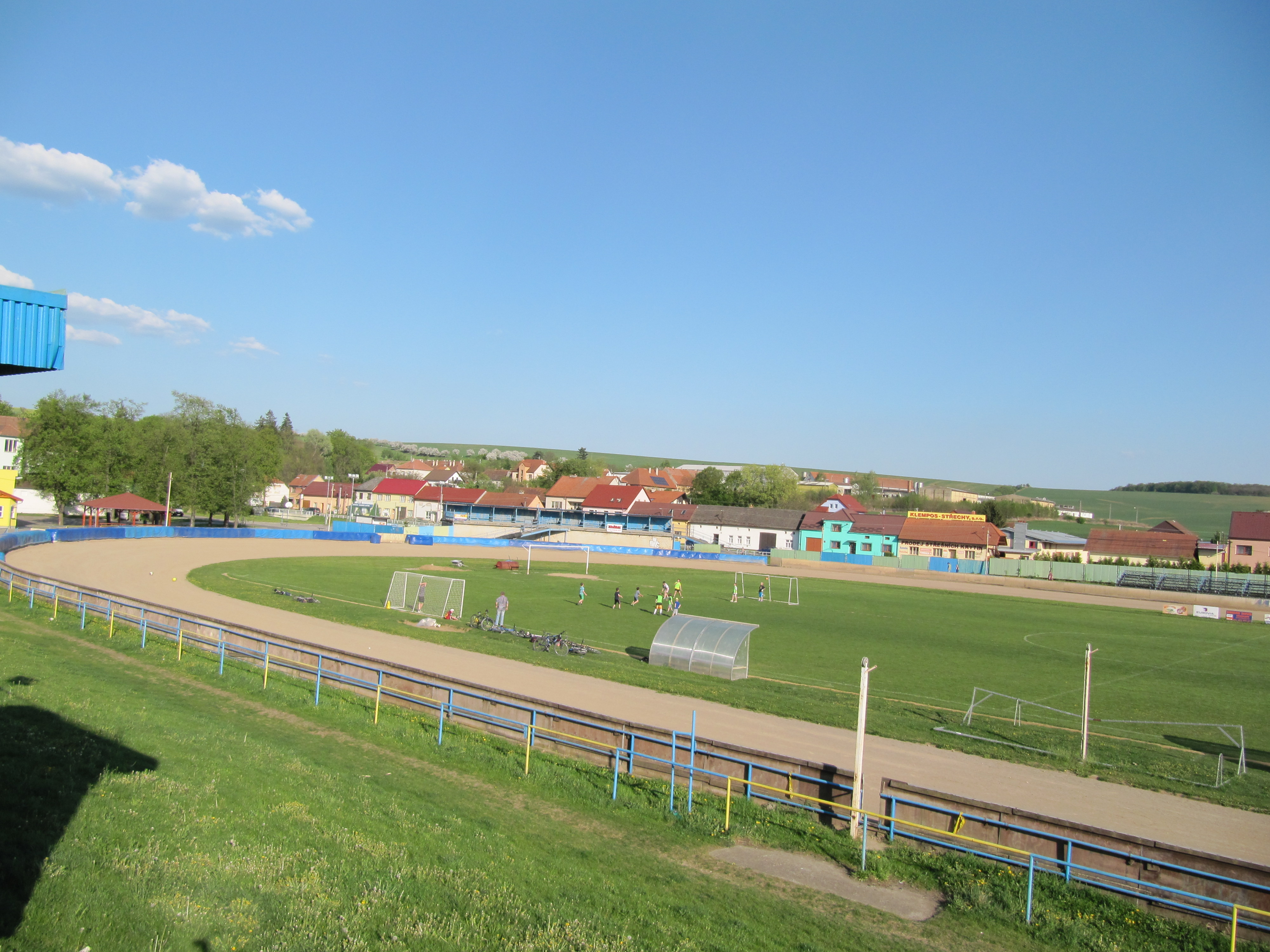
The speedway track and football pitch

During the 1950s a group of motor enthusiasts built a motocross circuit approximately three kilometres south of the village of Březolupy but because only one meeting per year was held they wanted something more regular. The residents chose the center of the village for a speedway track and constructed it during the early 1960s before opening on 16 July 1961.

Rudolf Havelka set the first track record and the venue hosted numerous rounds of the Czech Republic Individual Speedway Championship. The 9 and 10 May 1964 is considered the birth of a team at the track and in 1970, the stadium added workshops and a clubhouse. The team competed in the Czechoslovak Team Speedway Championship and regularly competed as AMK Březolupy until the Dissolution of Czechoslovakia.

After the dissolution, the team participated in the Czech Republic Team Speedway Championship, enjoying their best period of success, gaining various sponsors such as Barum, Mitas and Z-Group and securing one silver medal in 1996 and three bronze medals in 1995, 1997 and 1999 respectively.

In 2016, the team merged for the season with the team PK Plzeň from Plzeň.
