= Petri Kokko (speedway rider) =

Finnish motorcycle speedway rider

- Born: 14 December 1969 (age 56); Tampere, Finland
- Nationality: Finnish

Career history

Sweden
- 1989-1995: Filbyterna
- 1996-1998: Smederna
- 1999-2001: Bysarna

Great Britain
- 1994: Newcastle Diamonds
- 1995-1996, 1998-1999: Reading Racers
- 2000: Eastbourne Eagles

Team honours
- 2000: Elite League
- 1998: Premier League KO Cup
- 2000: Allsvenskan Winner

Petri Kari Kullervo Kokko is a Finnish former motorcycle speedway rider who was a member of Finland team at 2001 Speedway World Cup and earned 3 caps for the Finland national speedway team.

== Career ==
Kokko joined Exeter in 1996 and rode for Reading Racers for four years, 1995 to 1996 and 1998 to 1999.

In 2000, Kokko rode for Eastbourne Eagles, where he won the British Elite League but was replaced by fellow Finnish rider Joonas Kylmäkorpi for the 2001 season.

== Career details ==
=== World Championships ===
- Team World Championship (Speedway World Team Cup and Speedway World Cup)
  - 2000 - 2nd place in Quarter-Final A
  - 2001 - 9th place

=== Domestic competitions ===
- Individual Finnish Championship
  - 1987 - 13th place (3 pts)
  - 1988 - 4th place (12 pts)
  - 1989 - 12th place (5 pts)
  - 1991 - 14th place (3 pts)
  - 1992 - 11th place (4 pts)
- Individual Junior Finnish Championship
  - 1990 - 4th place (11+3 pts)
- Elite League
  - 2000 - Winner

== See also ==
- Finland national speedway team
