= Plzeň speedway track =

Stadium in Plzeň, Czech Republic

- Location: Univerzitní 15, 301 00 Plzeň, Czech Republic
- Coordinates: 49°43′20″N 13°20′48″E
- Opened: 17 July 1960

Plzeň speedway track is a motorcycle speedway track in Plzeň, Czech Republic. It is located on the Dobřanská road, off the Univerzitní road. The speedway club PK Plzeň is based at the track.

== History ==
The track was constructed during the beginning of 1959 and was completed in 1960. The opening fixture was a match between Plzeň and RH Prague on 17 July 1960.

The venue has hosted major speedway events, including the qualifying rounds of the 1960 Speedway World Team Cup, which attracted over 10,000 spectators and the 1961 Speedway World Team Cup.

In 2015, the track hosted the Team Junior European Championship and most recently the qualifying round of the 2022 Individual Speedway Junior European Championship was held at the venue.
