= Březolupy =

- Municipality
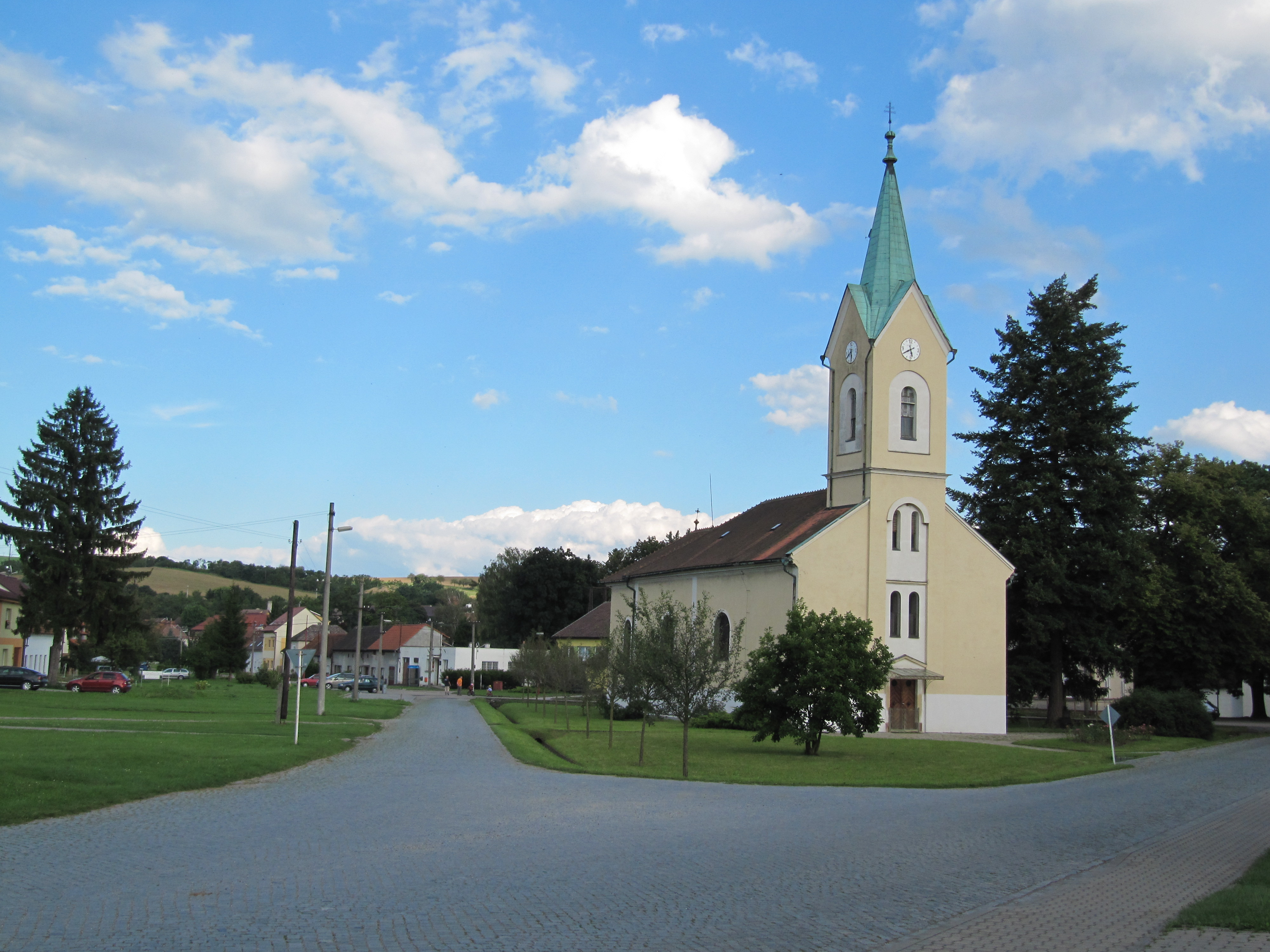
- Church of the Assumption of the Virgin Mary

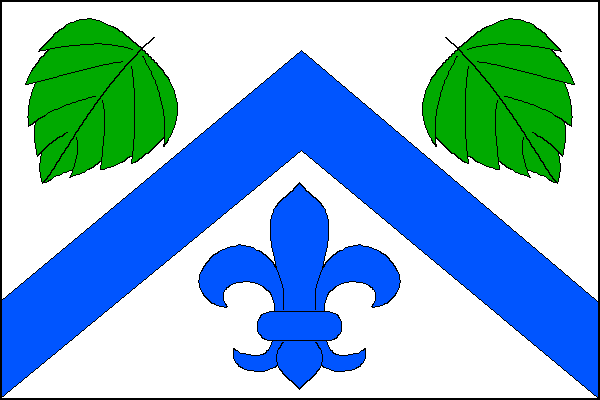
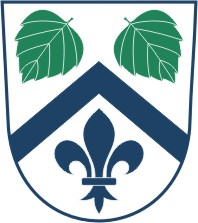
- Flag Coat of arms

- Location in the Czech Republic
- Coordinates: 49°7′17″N 17°34′49″E
- Country: Czech Republic
- Region: Zlín
- District: Uherské Hradiště
- First mentioned: 1261

Area
  - Total: 15.80 km^{2} (6.10 sq mi)
- Elevation: 212 m (696 ft)

Population (2026-01-01)
  - Total: 1,708
  - Density: 108.1/km^{2} (280.0/sq mi)
- Time zone: UTC+1 (CET)
  - Summer (DST): UTC+2 (CEST)
- Postal code: 687 13
- Website: brezolupy.cz

Březolupy is a municipality and village in Uherské Hradiště District in the Zlín Region of the Czech Republic. It has about 1,700 inhabitants.

== Geography ==
Březolupy is located about 10 kilometres (6 mi) northeast of Uherské Hradiště and 12 km (7 mi) south of Zlín. It lies in the Vizovice Highlands. The highest point is at 359 m (1,178 ft) above sea level. The Březnice River flows through the municipality.

== History ==
The first written mention of Březolupy is from 1261, when it was owned by the Smilheim monastery in Vizovice. At the end of the 14th century, the village was divided into several parts with different owners. In 1480, the Lords of Šarov bought all the parts and united the estate. In 1496, they sold the estate to the Lords of Kunštát.

Březolupy was burned down several times in the first half of the 17th century, during the Bocskai uprising and Thirty Years' War. The village was also damaged by the Turkish raid in 1663, by the Kuruc uprising in 1683, and by the Rákóczi's War of Independence in 1703–1706. In 1650–1687, Březolupy was owned by the Horecký family. From 1687 to 1733, it was a property of the Forgách family. After it changed hands several times, the village was bought by the Bucquoy family in 1756. They owned it until 1788.

== Demographics ==
Historical population

Year	Pop.	±%
1869	967	—
1880	1,054	+9.0%
1890	1,192	+13.1%
1900	1,360	+14.1%
1910	1,362	+0.1%

Year	Pop.	±%
1921	1,485	+9.0%
1930	1,416	−4.6%
1950	1,615	+14.1%
1961	1,738	+7.6%
1970	1,770	+1.8%

Year	Pop.	±%
1980	1,637	−7.5%
1991	1,535	−6.2%
2001	1,548	+0.8%
2011	1,669	+7.8%
2021	1,664	−0.3%

Source: Censuses

== Transport ==
There are no railways or major roads passing through the municipality.

== Sport ==
Březolupy is known for a motorcycle speedway track, which hosts the club Autoklub Březolupy founded in 1961. The track is located in the centre of Březolupy and surrounds a football pitch.

== Sights ==
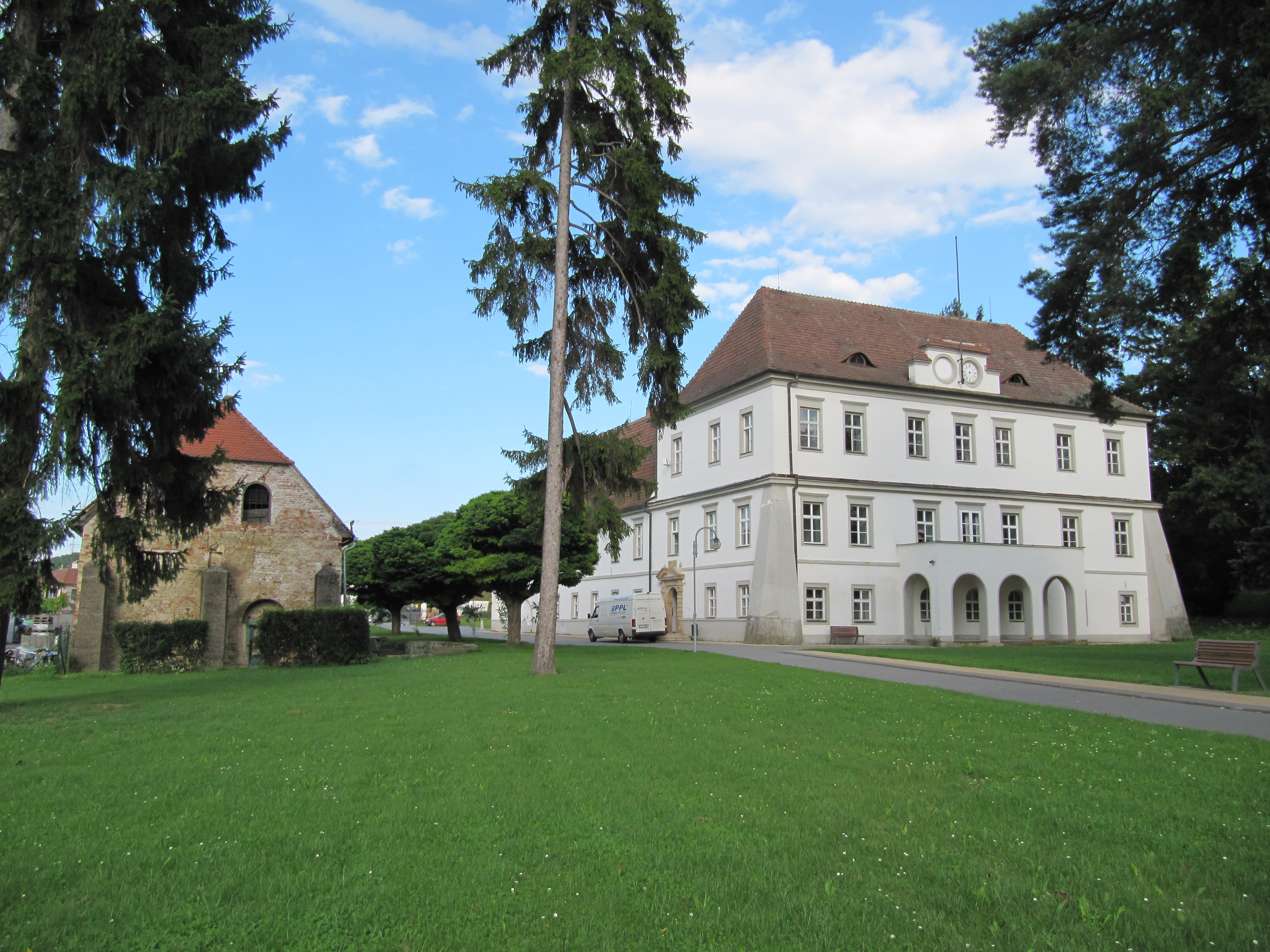
Březolupy Castle

The most valuable monument is the Březolupy Castle. It was built in the early Baroque style in the second half of the 17th century, on the site of an older Renaissance fortress. In the 18th and 19th centuries, the castle was rebuilt in the Neoclassical style, and the castle park was founded. Today the building houses the municipal office.

A notable landmark is the Church of the Assumption of the Virgin Mary. It was built in 1774–1788. Construction of the tower was finished in 1873.
