= Býkev =

- Municipality
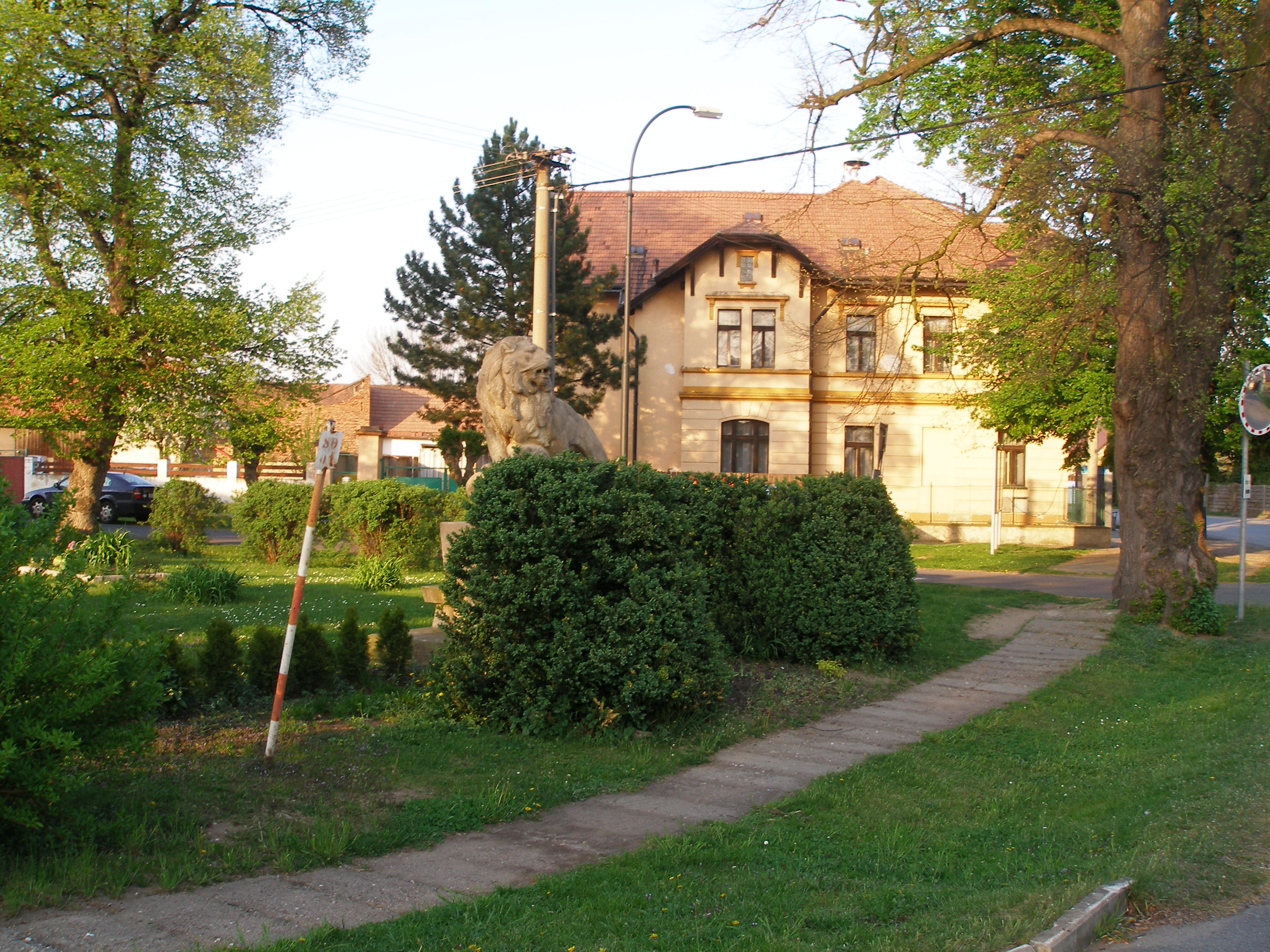
- Centre of Býkev

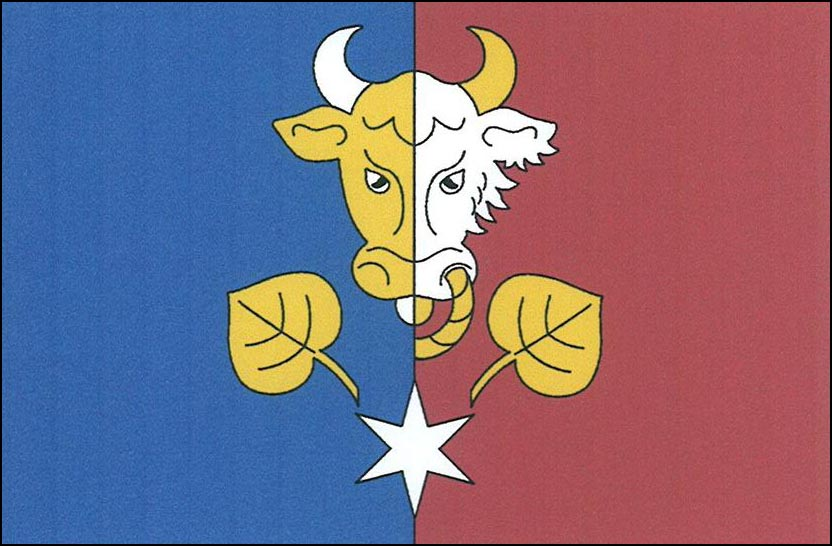
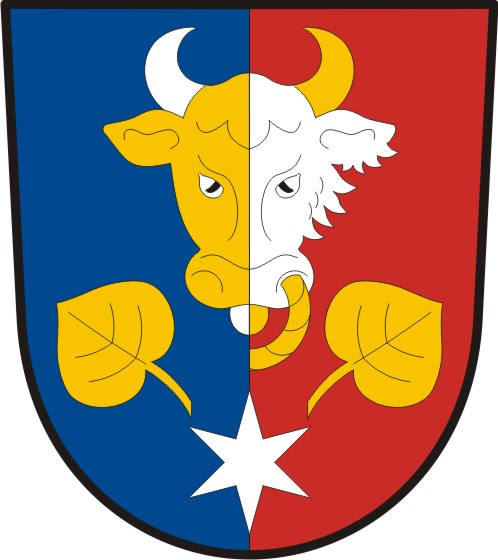
- Flag Coat of arms

- Location in the Czech Republic
- Coordinates: 50°20′50″N 14°25′5″E
- Country: Czech Republic
- Region: Central Bohemian
- District: Mělník
- First mentioned: 1392

Area
  - Total: 5.62 km^{2} (2.17 sq mi)
- Elevation: 166 m (545 ft)

Population (2026-01-01)
  - Total: 596
  - Density: 106/km^{2} (275/sq mi)
- Time zone: UTC+1 (CET)
  - Summer (DST): UTC+2 (CEST)
- Postal code: 276 01
- Website: www.obecbykev.cz

Býkev is a municipality and village in Mělník District in the Central Bohemian Region of the Czech Republic. It has about 600 inhabitants.

== Administrative division ==
Býkev consists of two municipal parts (in brackets population according to the 2021 census):

- Býkev (379)
- Jenišovice (116)

== Geography ==
Býkev is located about 4 kilometres (2 mi) west of Mělník and 28 km (17 mi) north of Prague. It lies in a flat agricultural landscape in the Central Elbe Table.

== History ==
The first written mention of Býkev is from 1392. Jenišovice was founded around 1250. For centuries, agriculture has been the main livelihood of the inhabitants. That did not change until 1994, when the State Farm ceased to exist.

== Demographics ==
Historical population

Year	Pop.	±%
1869	323	—
1880	351	+8.7%
1890	424	+20.8%
1900	420	−0.9%
1910	491	+16.9%

Year	Pop.	±%
1921	474	−3.5%
1930	478	+0.8%
1950	315	−34.1%
1961	331	+5.1%
1970	356	+7.6%

Year	Pop.	±%
1980	359	+0.8%
1991	323	−10.0%
2001	329	+1.9%
2011	388	+17.9%
2021	495	+27.6%

Source: Censuses

== Transport ==
The I/16 road (the section from Mělník to Slaný) runs through Býkev.

The railway line Prague–Ústí nad Labem goes through the municipality, but there is no train station.

== Sights ==
The main landmark of Býkov is the monument to the victims of World War I, built in the form of the Czech Lion (heraldic symbol of the Czech Republic) in 1918–1920.
