= 2000 Swedish speedway season =

Motorcycle racing competition

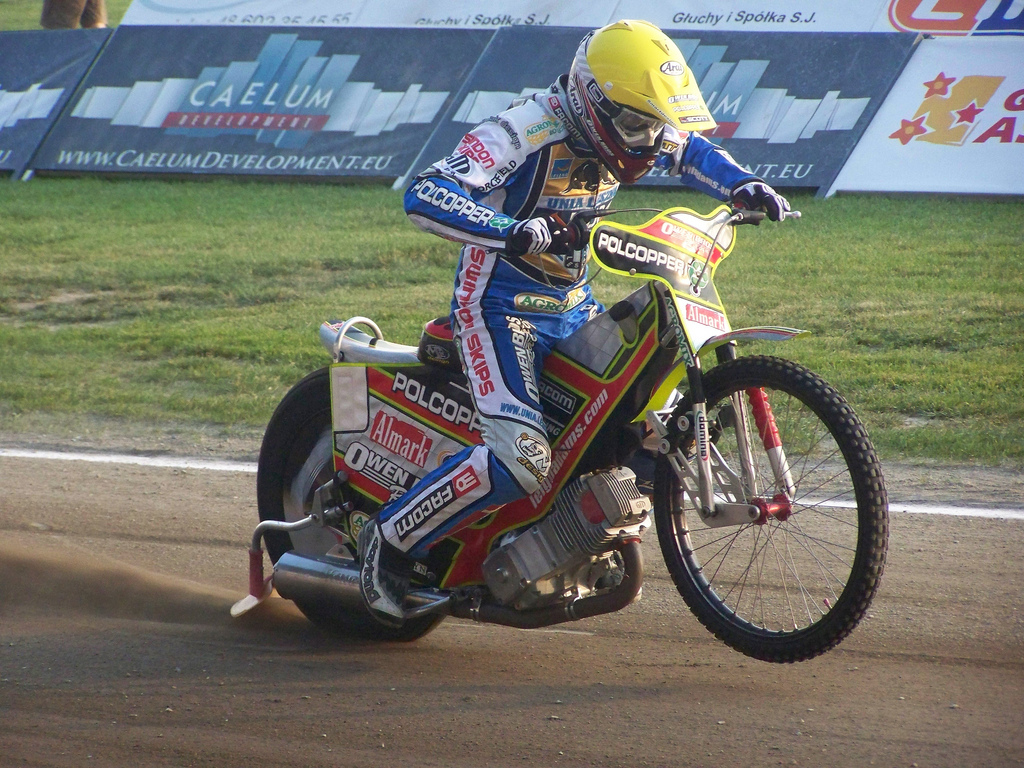
- Australian Leigh Adams helped Masarna win their first Elitserien.

The 2000 Swedish speedway season was the 2000 season of motorcycle speedway in Sweden.

== Individual ==
=== Individual Championship ===
The 2000 Swedish Individual Speedway Championship final was held at the Målilla Motorstadion in Målilla, on 19 August. Henrik Gustafsson won the Swedish Championship for the second time.

Pos	Rider	Team	Pts	Total
1	Henrik Gustafsson	Indianerna	(3,3,3,3,3)	15
2	Niklas Klingberg	Örnarna	(3,2,3,3,1)	12+3
3	Mikael Karlsson	Valsarna	(3,3,3,w,3)	12+2
4	Tony Rickardsson	Masarna	(2,3,2,1,3)	11
5	Magnus Zetterström	Smederna	(2,2,3,3,0)	10
6	Andreas Jonsson	Rospiggarna	(2,1,2,2,2)	9
7	Peter Karlsson	Kaparna	(2,2,1,2,2)	9
8	Claes Ivarsson	Vetlanda	(3,1,2,0,1)	7
9	Niklas Karlsson	Vargarna	(1,0,1,3,2)	7
10	Joonas Kylmäkorpi	Kaparna	(1,2,2,1,1)	7
11	John Cook	Smederna	(w,1,w,2,3)	6
12	Robert Johansson	Västervik	(0,1,1,1,2)	5
13	Stefan Andersson	Team Svelux	(1,3,w,-,-)	4
14	Daniel Nermark	Valsarna	(0,0,0,2,0)	2
15	Peter I. Karlsson	Masarna	(1,in,1,-,-)	2
16	Freddie Eriksson	Rospiggarna	(0,0,0,1,0)	1
17	Daniel Andersson (res)	Lindarna	(0,1)	1
18	Stefan Ekberg (res)	Piraterna	(0.0)	0

Key

- points per race - 3 for a heat win, 2 for 2nd, 1 for third, 0 for last
- +3 won race off, +2 2nd in race off, +1, 3rd in race off, +0 last in race off
- ef - engine failure
- t - tape touching excluded
- u - fell
- w - excluded

=== U21 Championship ===
Andreas Jonsson won the U21 championship.

== Team ==
=== Team Championship ===
Masarna won the Elitserien and were declared the winners of the Swedish Speedway Team Championship for the first time in their history. The Masarna team included Tony Rickardsson, Leigh Adams, Antonín Kasper Jr. and Gary Havelock.

Bysarna won the Allsvenskan and Lejonen won the first division.

Elitserien
Pos	Team	Pts
1	Masarna	34
2	Valsarna	30
3	Rospiggarna	29
4	Kaparna	27
5	Vargarna	26
6	Indianerna	21
7	Västervik	19
8	Team Svelux	18
9	Smederna	17
10	Örnarna	4

Allsvenskan
Pos	Team	Pts
1	Bysarna	21
2	Vetlanda	20
3	Filbyterna	17
4	Piraterna	10
5	Karlstad	7
6	Nässjö	6
7	Getingarna	3

Div 1
Pos	Team	Pts
1	Lejonen	20
2	Lindarna	18
3	Team Viking	10
4	Korparna	0

== See also ==
- Speedway in Sweden
