= Slaný Speedway Stadium =

Stadium in Slaný, Czech Republic

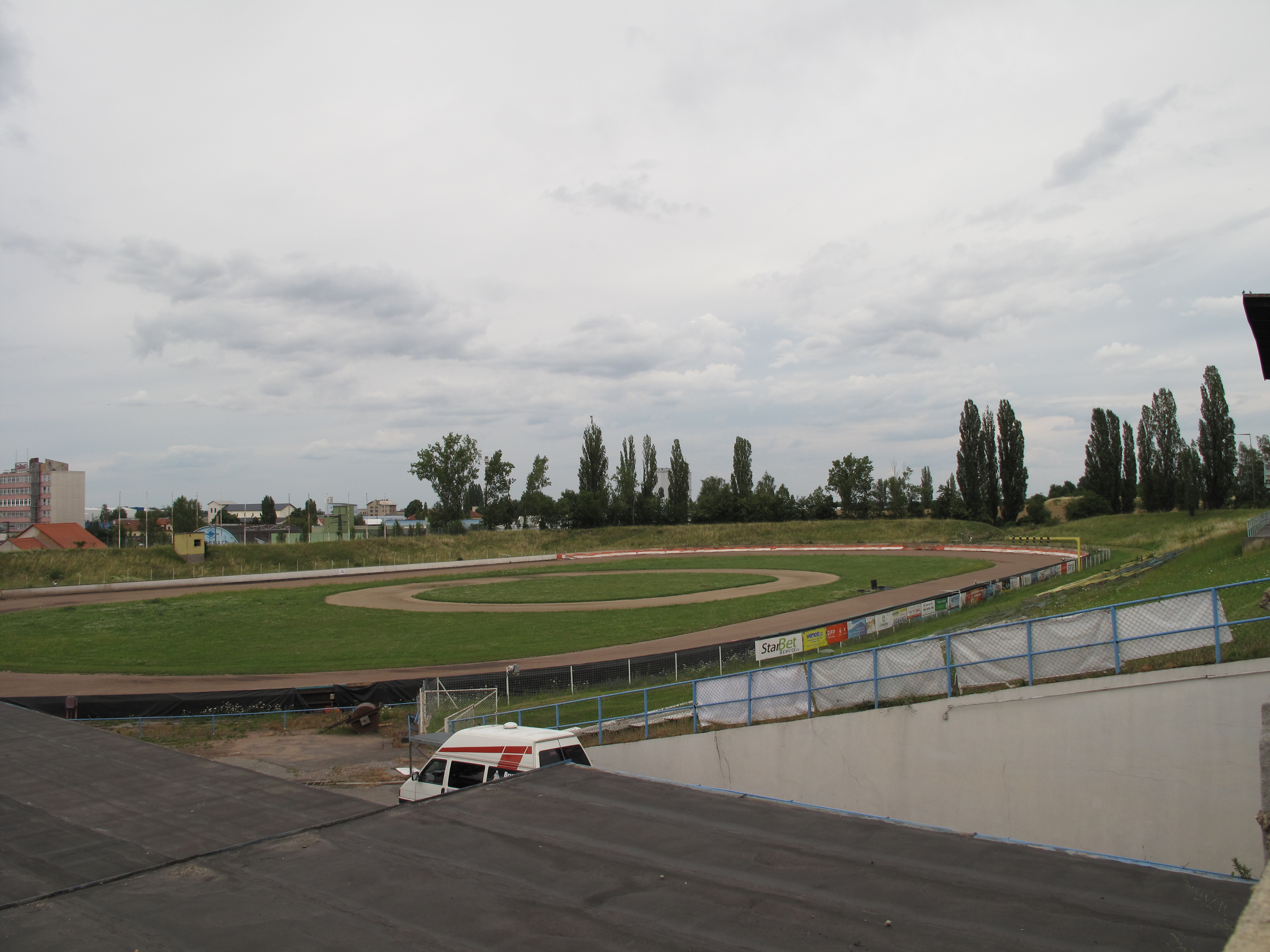
- Location: Netovická 1509, 274 01 Slaný 1, Czech Republic
- Coordinates: 50°13′25″N 14°05′50″E
- Opened: 13 August 1950
- Length: 0.382 km

Slaný Speedway Stadium (Czech: Stadion ploché dráhy Slaný) is a speedway track in Slaný, Czech Republic. The track is located on the Netovická road in the southeastern area of the town. The stadium hosts the speedway team AK Slaný.

== History ==
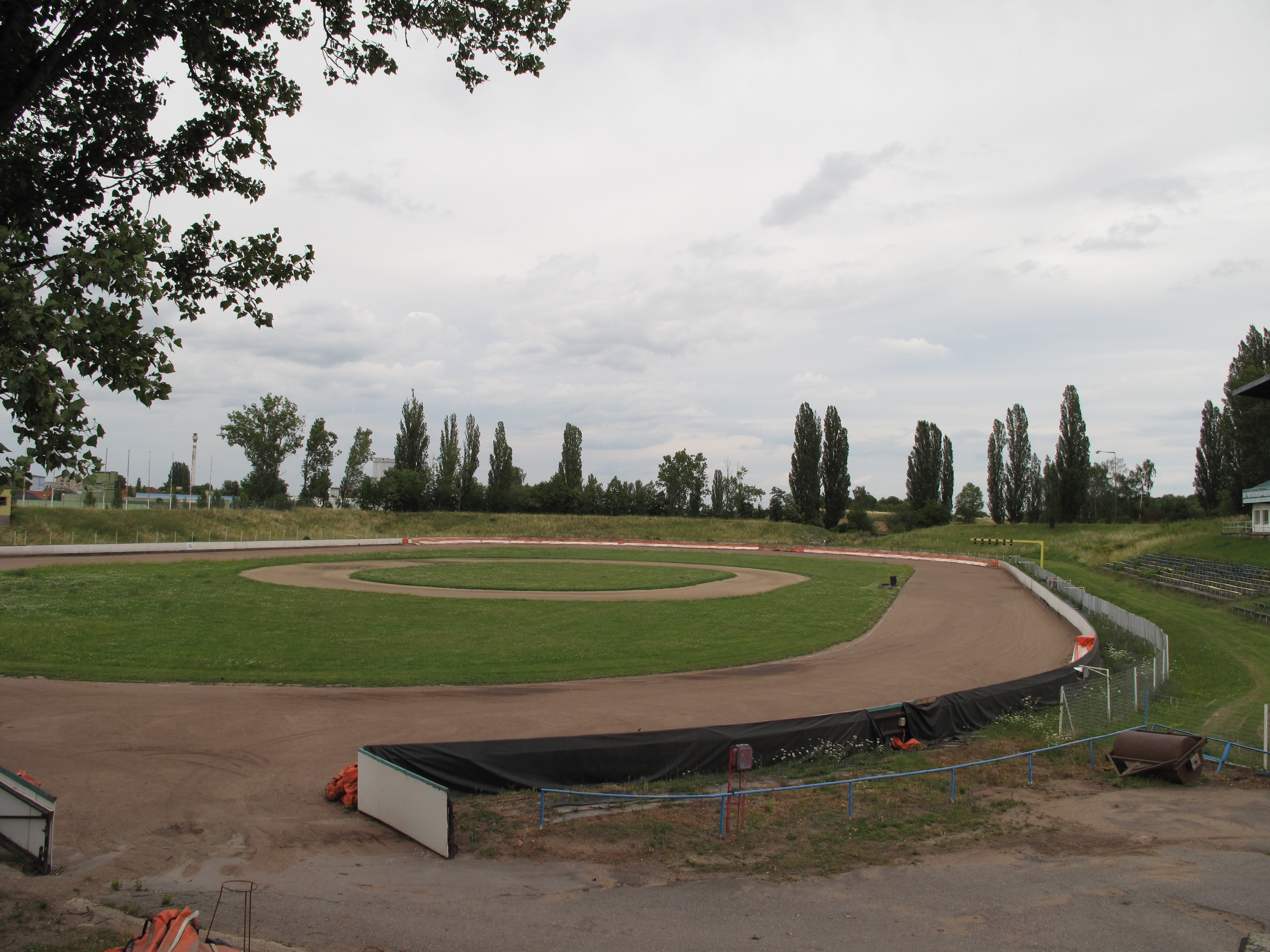

The stadium was constructed throughout 1948 and 1949 and opened on 13 August 1950. Major reconstructions took place in 1958 and 1974, the latter when FIM regulations required a cinder/shale track. In-between the stadium hosted arguably what was its most significant event, the final of the 1962 Speedway World Team Cup, which attracted a crowd of 35,000.

Further major events took place at the track when the final of the Speedway Under-21 World Championship was held in 1981 and 1988 respectively.

In 1986, the width of the track increased allowing six riders to race and in 1988 a grandstand opened which featured VIP areas and seating for 1,000 spectators. The 2002 Speedway Under-21 World Championship was hosted at the stadium and was won by Czech rider Lukáš Dryml and in 2003 Krzysztof Kasprzak won the Individual Speedway European Championship.

The track record was broken by Robert Kościecha, who recorded 67.94 seconds on 23 June 2010.
