= Chabařovice Speedway =

Czech motorcycle speedway team

Coordinates: 50°40′21.25″N 13°56′6.84″E

Club information
- Track address: Moto Areál Chabařovice
- Country: Czech Republic
- Founded: 1973
- League: Czech league
- Website: speedwayclub-chabarovice.estranky.cz

Major team honours
Czechoslovak Team Speedway Championship bronze	1991

Chabařovice Speedway is the motorcycle speedway club known as AK Chabařovice and the Moto Areál Chabařovice, which hosts the club. The stadium is located in the western outskirts of Chabařovice in the Czech Republic, off the Nádražní ul.

== History ==
The Moto Areál Chabařovice opened in 1973 and the AK Chabařovice team raced in the Czechoslovak Team Speedway Championship from 1979 until the Dissolution of Czechoslovakia.

Then participating in the Czech Republic Team Speedway Championship, the team raced from 1992 until 1999, primarily in the Extraliga.

The track hosts the annual Jiří Hurych memorial race.
