= AK Slaný =

Czech motorcycle speedway team

Club information
- Track address: Slaný Speedway Stadium
- Country: Czech Republic
- League: Czech Extraliga
- Website: speedwayslany.wbs.cz

Club facts
- Track size: 382 metres

Major team honours
Extraliga champion (x2)	2005, 2006
Czechoslovak league champion (x1)	1969
Extraliga runner-up (x7)	1993, 2002–2004, 2019, 2022–2023
Czechoslovak league runner-up (x7)	1970–1973, 1975–1977

Autoklub v AČR Slaný is a Czech motorcycle speedway team based in Slaný, Czech Republic. The team race at the Slaný Speedway Stadium.

== History ==
The training of club riders first took place in 1957 and the team first competed in the Czechoslovak Team Speedway Championship during 1967, finishing second in group A of the 1.liga.

Club rider Jan Holub I won the Czechoslovak Individual Speedway Championship in 1969 and Jan Klokočka rode for the club for 18 years.

The team were champions of the former Czechoslovakia in 1969 and competed as Bateria Slaný (due to a battery company sponsorship) until 1986. They took on the name of Výstavba dolu Slaný (due to a mining construction company sponsorship) several years before the Dissolution of Czechoslovakia.

Zdeněk Tesař won the Czech Republic Individual Speedway Championship as a Slaný rider, in 1995.

Continuing as AK Slaný the team competed in the Czech Republic Team Speedway Championship and won the Extraliga in 2005 and 2006. The team were sponsored by mobile phone company 3ton from 2015 to 2019.
