= Zdeněk Tesař =

Czech speedway rider

- Born: 30 July 1964 (age 62); Ostrava, Czechoslovakia
- Nickname: Sam
- Nationality: Czech

Career history

Czech Republic
- 1995: Slaný

Great Britain
- 1991-1993: Ipswich Witches
- 1994-1997, 1999-2002: Peterborough Panthers
- 1998: Belle Vue Aces

Individual honours
- 1990: World Championship finalist (13th)
- 1992: World Championship finalist (15th)
- 1995: Czech Champion

Zdeněk Tesař (born 30 July 1964) is a former speedway rider from the Czech Republic. He earned 13 international caps for the Czechoslovakia national speedway team.

== Speedway career ==
Tesař reached two Speedway World Championship finals in 1990 and 1992. He won the 1995 Czech Republic Individual Speedway Championship.

Tesař rode in the top tier of British Speedway riding for Belle Vue Aces, Ipswich Witches and Peterborough Panthers from 1991 until 2002.

== World Final appearances ==
=== Individual World Championship ===
- 1990 - (England) Bradford, Odsal Stadium - 13th - 2pts
- 1992 - (Poland) Wrocław, Olympic Stadium - 15th - 5pts

=== World Pairs Championship ===
- 1989 - (Poland) Leszno, Alfred Smoczyk Stadium (with Bohumil Brhel) - 7th - 25pts
- 1991 - (Poland) Poznań, Olimpia Poznań Stadium (with Roman Matoušek and Bohumil Brhel) - 5th 18pts
