= Dennis Löfqvist =

Swedish speedway rider

- Born: 1 January 1967 (age 59); Visby, Sweden
- Nationality: Swedish

Career history

Sweden
- 1983-1992, 1994-1995, 1999: Bysarna

Great Britain
- 1989-1992: King's Lynn Stars

Individual honours
- 1990: Speedway World Championship reserve

Team honours
- 1988: Swedish Elitserien Champion
- 1985: Allsvenskan Div 1 Champion

Dennis Fritz Löfqvist (born 1 January 1967) is a former speedway rider from Sweden. He earned seven caps for the Sweden national speedway team.

== Speedway career ==
Löfqvist rode in the top tier of British Speedway from 1989 until 1992, riding for King's Lynn Stars.

Löfqvist stood as reserve for the final of the Speedway World Championship in the 1990 Individual Speedway World Championship following a successful qualification through the Nordic final and his high placing in the Intercontinental Final.

== Family ==
Löfqvist's father Christer was also an international speedway rider.
