= Liberec Speedway =

Czech motorcycle speedway team

Coordinates: 50°47′0.93″N 15°2′35.22″E

Club information
- Track address: Pavlovický Stadion
- Country: Czech Republic
- League: Czech Extraliga
- Website: www.motolbc.cz

Major team honours
Extraliga runner-up	2021

Liberec Speedway is the motorcycle speedway club known as Plochá dráha klub v AČR Liberec and the Pavlovický Stadion, which hosts the club. The stadium is located in the northern outskirts of Liberec in the Czech Republic, off the Letná 618.

== History ==
The Pavlovický Stadion was built in 1930.

The team have had a sporadic existence, first competing in the Czechoslovak Team Speedway Championship as Liaz Liberec in 1970. Liaz (LIberecké Automobilové Závody) was a manufacturer of trucks. Over the next two decades a team from Liberec would not compete every year but AMK Liberec won the 1.Liga in 1990 before the Dissolution of Czechoslovakia.

Then participating in the Czech Republic Team Speedway Championship, teams known as GRS Liberec, SK Kaltina Liberec and GRSBM Liberec (all due to various sponsorships) represented Liberec.

The most important event that was run at the stadium was the semi-final of the Under-21 World Championship in 2019.

Also in 2021, the team now known as Aforti Start Gniezno Liberec (due to a collaboration between the club and the Polish team Start Gniezno) won the silver medal in the Czech Republic Team Championship.
