= Czech Republic Team Speedway Championship =

Annual Czech Republic national speedway competition

Czech Republic Speedway Championship
- Sport: Motorcycle speedway
- Founded: 1956

The Czech Republic Speedway Team Championships is an annual motorcycle speedway event held each year and organised by the Autoklub České republiky to determine the champions of the Czech Republic. From 1956 until 1991 the competition was for teams in Czechoslovakia, although due to the lack of clubs in Slovakia, it was dominated by Czech teams.

The competition is today called the Extraliga for the top division and the 1.Liga for the division below.

== Past winners ==
=== Czechoslovakia (1956-1991) ===
Year	Winners	Runner-up	3rd place
1956	Rudá Hvězda Praha	KAMK Praha	KAMK Plzeň
1957	Rudá Hvězda Praha	KAMK Pardubice	KAMK Praha
1958	Rudá Hvězda Praha	KAMK Plzeň	KAMK Ostrava
1959	Rudá Hvězda Praha	KAMK Praha	KAMK České Budějovice
1960	Rudá Hvězda Praha	KAMK Praha	KAMK Plzeň
1961	Rudá Hvězda Praha	Severocosky KV Ústí nad Labem	Vychodocesky KV Hradec Králové
1962	Rudá Hvězda Praha	MV Praha	Vychodocesky KV Hradec Králové
1963 to 1966 not held
1967	Victoria SC Praha	Rudá Hvězda Praha	AK Slaný / AMK Ústí nad Labem
1968	Rudá Hvězda Praha	AMK Ústí nad Labem	Victoria SC Praha
1969	AK Slaný	Rudá Hvězda Praha	AMK Ústí nad Labem
1970	Rudá Hvězda Praha	AK Slaný	AK Kopřivnice
1971	Rudá Hvězda Praha	AK Slaný	AMK Ústí nad Labem
1972	Rudá Hvězda Praha	AK Slaný	AMK Zlatá Přilba Pardubice
1973	Rudá Hvězda Praha	AK Slaný	AMK Zlatá Přilba Pardubice
1974	Rudá Hvězda Praha	ČSAD Plzeň	AK Slaný
1975	Rudá Hvězda Praha	AK Slaný	AMK Zlatá Přilba Pardubice
1976	Rudá Hvězda Praha	AK Slaný	ČSAD Plzeň
1977	Rudá Hvězda Praha	AK Slaný	AMK Zlatá Přilba Pardubice
1978	AMK Zlatá Přilba Pardubice	Rudá Hvězda Praha	AK Slaný
1979	Rudá Hvězda Praha	AMK Zlatá Přilba Pardubice	AK Slaný
1980	Rudá Hvězda Praha	AMK Zlatá Přilba Pardubice	ČSAD Plzeň
1981	Rudá Hvězda Praha	AMK Zlatá Přilba Pardubice	AK Slaný
1982	AMK Zlatá Přilba Pardubice	Rudá Hvězda Praha	AK Slaný
1983	Rudá Hvězda Praha	SVS Pardubice	AK Slaný
1984	SVS Pardubice	Rudá Hvězda Praha	ČSAD Plzeň
1985	Rudá Hvězda Praha	SVS Pardubice	ČSAD Plzeň
1986	Rudá Hvězda Praha	SVS Pardubice	AK Slaný
1987	Rudá Hvězda Praha	SVS Pardubice	Rudá Hvězda Praha B
1988	Rudá Hvězda Praha B	Rudá Hvězda Praha	SVS Pardubice
1989	SVS Pardubice	Rudá Hvězda Praha B	Rudá Hvězda Praha
1990	Olymp Praha	SVS Pardubice	Olymp Praha B
1991	Olymp Praha	AMK Zlatá Přilba Pardubice	AK Chabařovice

=== Czech Republic ===
Year	Winners	Runner-up	3rd place
1992	PSK Olymp Praha	AMK Zlatá Přilba Pardubice	AK Slaný
1993	PSK Olymp Praha	AK Slaný	AMK Zlatá Přilba Pardubice
1994	PK Plzeň	PSK Olymp Praha	AMK Zlatá Přilba Pardubice
1995	PSK Olymp Praha	AMK Zlatá Přilba Pardubice	AK Březolupy
1996	Olymp Praha	AK Březolupy	AMK Zlatá Přilba Pardubice
1997	Olymp Praha	AMK Zlatá Přilba Pardubice	AK Březolupy
1998	Olymp Praha	AMK Zlatá Přilba Pardubice	AK Slaný
1999	AMK Zlatá Přilba Pardubice	Olymp Praha	AK Březolupy
2000	Olymp Praha	AMK Zlatá Přilba Pardubice	AK Slaný
2001	AMK Zlatá Přilba Pardubice	Olymp Praha	AK Slaný
2002	AMK Zlatá Přilba Pardubice	AK Slaný	Olymp Praha
2003	Olymp Praha	AK Slaný	AMK Zlatá Přilba Pardubice
2004	AMK Zlatá Přilba Pardubice	AK Slaný	Olymp Praha
2005	AK Slaný	AMK Zlatá Přilba Pardubice	Olymp Praha
2006	AK Slaný	PK Plzeň	PSK Olymp Praha
2007	PK Plzeň	AMK Zlatá Přilba Pardubice	AK Slaný
2008	AMK Zlatá Přilba Pardubice	PDK Mšeno	PSK Olymp Praha
2009	PDK Mšeno	AMK Zlatá Přilba Pardubice	AK Slaný
2010	PDK Mšeno	Olymp Praha	AMK Zlatá Přilba Pardubice
2011	PDK Mšeno	AMK Zlatá Přilba Pardubice	Olymp Praha
2012	Olymp Praha	AMK Zlatá Přilba Pardubice	Plzeň-Divišov
2013	AMK Zlatá Přilba Pardubice	Olymp Praha	AK Slaný
2014	Olymp Praha	AMK Zlatá Přilba Pardubice	AK Slaný
2015	AMK Zlatá Přilba Pardubice	AK Markéta Praha	AK Slaný
2016	AMK Zlatá Přilba Pardubice	AK Markéta Praha	AK Slaný
2017	AK Markéta Praha	AMK Zlatá Přilba Pardubice	AK Slaný
2018	AMK Zlatá Přilba Pardubice	AK Markéta Praha	AK Slaný
2019	AK Markéta Praha	AK Slaný	SC Żarnovica
2020	AK Markéta Praha	AMK Zlatá Přilba Pardubice	AK Slaný
2021	AMK Zlatá Přilba Pardubice	Start Gniezno Liberec	AK Markéta Praha
2022	AK Markéta Praha	AK Slaný	AMK Zlatá Přilba Pardubice
2023	AMK Zlatá Přilba Pardubice	AK Slaný	AK Markéta Praha

== See also ==
- Czech Republic national speedway team
- Czechoslovakia national speedway team
- Speedway Grand Prix of Czech Republic
- Czech Republic Individual Speedway Championship
