= Claes Ivarsson =

Swedish speedway rider

- Born: 4 April 1968; Sweden
- Died: 10 July 2017 (aged 49); Sweden
- Nationality: Swedish

Career history

Sweden
- 1984-1998, 2000-2004: Njudungarna/Vetlanda
- 2000, 2003: Örnarna
- 2001, 2005-2006: Bysarna

Denmark
- 1990: Brovst

Individual honours
- 1992: Swedish Championship bronze medal

Team honours
- 1986, 1987: Elitserien Champion
- 2002: Allsvenskan Champion

Claes Ivarsson (1968–2017) was an international speedway rider from Sweden.

== Speedway career ==
Ivarsson won a bronze medal at the Swedish Individual Speedway Championship in 1992. He rode for Elit Vetlanda Speedway for 20 years, scoring 2,390 points.

Ivarsson rode for in the Vetlanda team in the Swedish Speedway Team Championship.

Ivarsson died in 2017.

== Family ==
Ivarsson's brother Conny was also an international speedway rider.
