= Markéta Stadium =

Stadium in Prague, Czech Republic

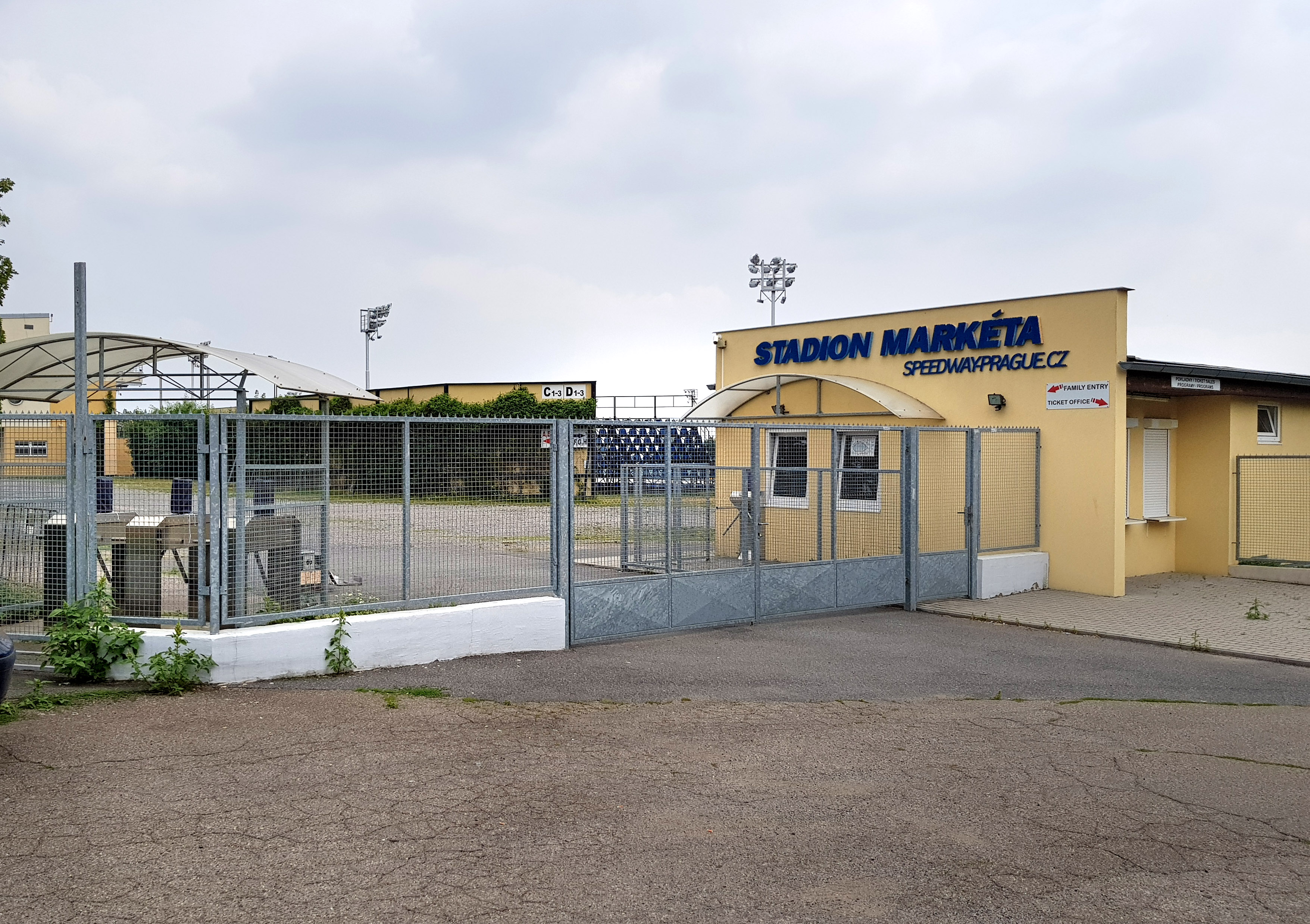
- Interactive map of Markéta Stadium
- Location: U Vojtěšky 11, Břevnov, Prague, Czech Republic, 162 00
- Coordinates: 50°05′01″N 14°21′02″E
- Owner: Olymp Centrum Sportu Ministerstva Vnitra
- Operator: Olymp Centrum Sportu Ministerstva Vnitra
- Capacity: 10,000
- Field size: 353 metres
- Field shape: oval

Construction
- Opened: 1930s

Tenants
- AK Markéta Praha; Motorcycle speedway

The Markéta Stadium (Czech: Plochodrážní stadion Markéta) is a 10,000-capacity multi-use stadium on U Vojtěšky in Břevnov, Prague, Czech Republic. The stadium hosts motorcycle speedway and has been the home of the Speedway Grand Prix of Czech Republic since 1997. The speedway track has a circumference of 353 metres (386 yards).

The stadium opened during the 1930s as an athletics ground and is home to the athletics club PSK Olymp Praha and the Prague speedway team AK Markéta Praha. Since 1959, it has been hosting international speedway events and on an annual basis it also holds the Luboš Tomíček Memorial, named after the rider Luboš Tomíček Sr.

In 2022, the stadium was selected as the first ever venue for 2022 SGP2. In 2023, the stadium hosted rugby matches during the 2022–23 Rugby Europe International Championships.

== See also ==
- Speedway Grand Prix of Czech Republic
- Prague Speedway
