= Slaný =

Town in the Czech Republic

- Town
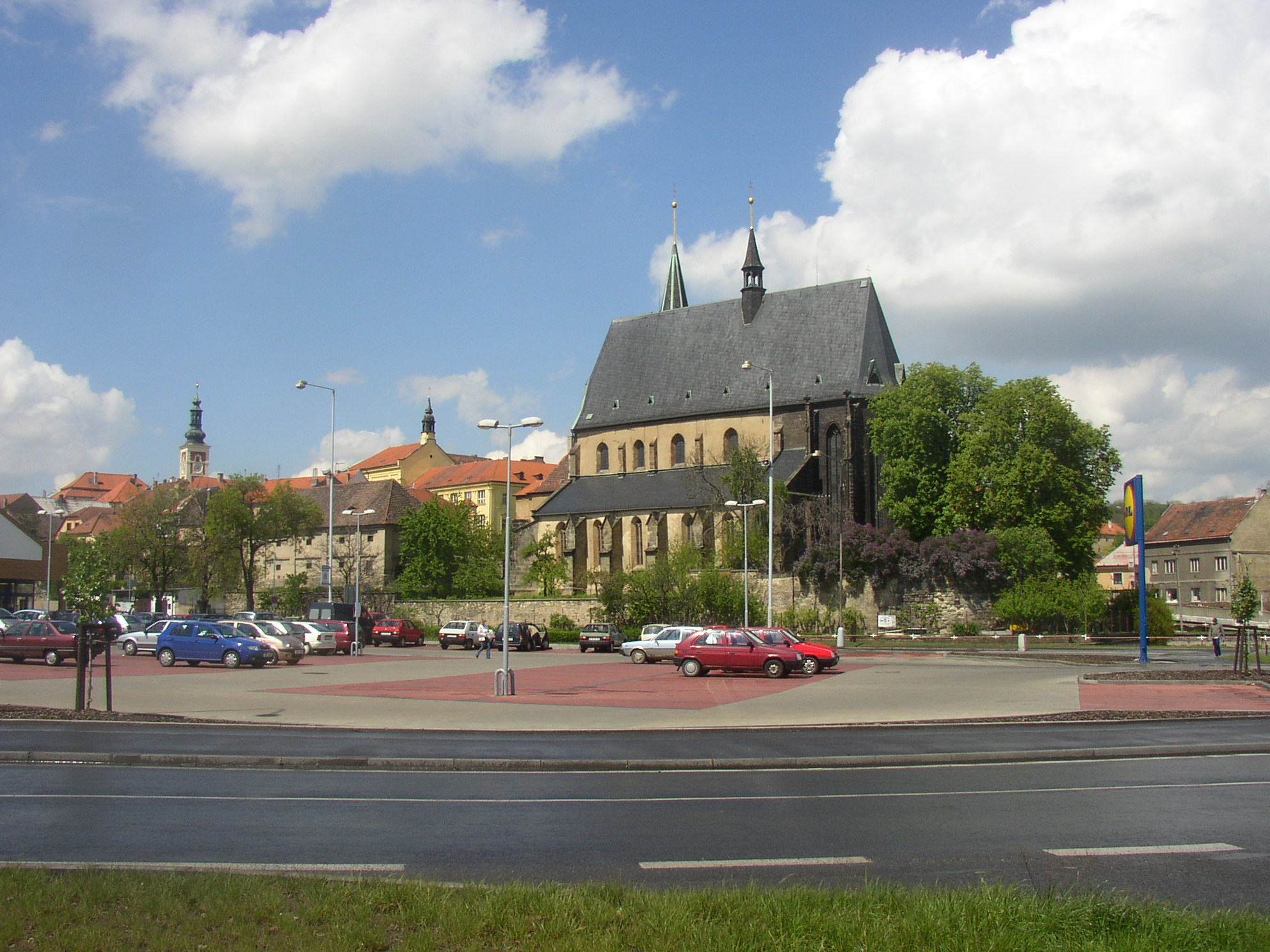
- Centre with the Church of Saint Gotthard

- Flag Coat of arms

- Location in the Czech Republic
- Coordinates: 50°13′50″N 14°5′13″E
- Country: Czech Republic
- Region: Central Bohemian
- District: Kladno
- First mentioned: 1262

Government
  - Mayor: Martin Hrabánek (ODS)

Area
  - Total: 35.12 km^{2} (13.56 sq mi)
- Elevation: 234 m (768 ft)

Population (2026-01-01)
  - Total: 17,247
  - Density: 491.1/km^{2} (1,272/sq mi)
- Time zone: UTC+1 (CET)
  - Summer (DST): UTC+2 (CEST)
- Postal codes: 273 79, 274 01
- Website: www.meuslany.cz

Slaný (Czech pronunciation: [ˈslaniː]; German: Schlan) is a town in Kladno District in the Central Bohemian Region of the Czech Republic. It has about 17,000 inhabitants. The town is located on the stream Červený potok in the Prague Plateau. The historic town centre is well preserved and is protected as an urban monument zone.

== Administrative division ==
Slaný consists of ten municipal parts (in brackets population according to the 2021 census):

- Slaný (13,728)
- Blahotice (27)
- Dolín (412)
- Kvíc (467)
- Kvíček (790)
- Lotouš (61)
- Netovice (77)
- Otruby (110)
- Trpoměchy (154)
- Želevčice (119)

== Etymology ==
The word slaný literally means 'salty' in Czech. According to the Wenceslaus Hajek's chronicle records, Slaný was founded at the site of a salt spring below the hill of Slánská hora.

== Geography ==
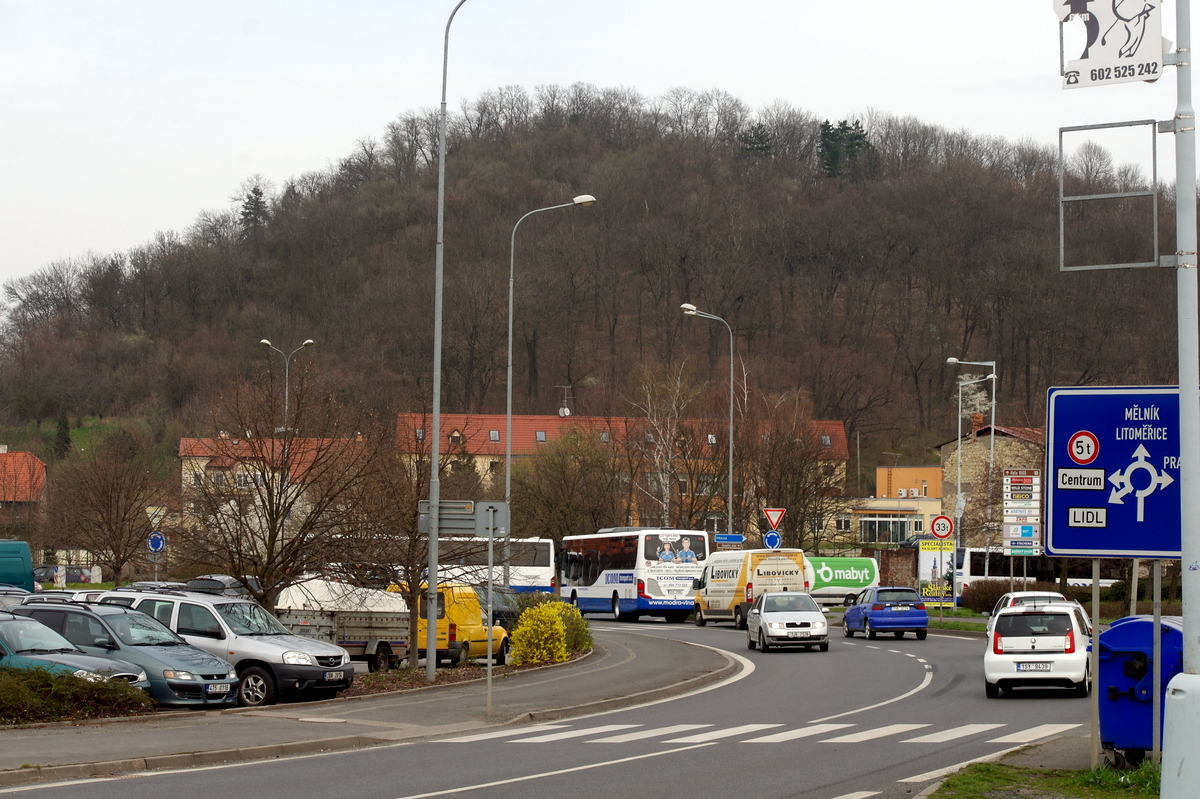
The hill Slánská hora

Slaný is located about 9 kilometres (6 mi) north of Kladno and 25 km (16 mi) northwest of Prague. It lies in the Prague Plateau. The highest point and a dominant feature of the town's panorama is the hill Slánská hora at 330 m (1,080 ft) above sea level. The stream of Červený potok flows through the municipal territory from the southwest to the northeast.

== History ==
The first written mention of Slaný is from 1262. The town grew as a result of its location on the trade route between Prague and Saxony. The Benedictines established a hospital here in 1136, together with a church dedicated to St. Gotthard. It was this large presence of the church, and the unconsolidated state of landed property that went with it, that allowed King Wenceslaus II of Bohemia to charter Slaný as a town and give his royal assent to its Magdeburg rights only sometime in the decade after 1295. In 1348, an earthquake damaged the now-fortified town; in 1371, a large fire broke out, and the church had to be rebuilt.

Slaný was captured by the Taborites in 1425 during the Hussite Wars, and remained in their hands until 1434. Not only did the Benedictine monks have to leave — this town by the hill was also one of Hussite holy cities, and their preachers expected it to survive the anticipated end of the world. Later, King George of Poděbrady gave Slaný many privileges, after the town had supported his election to the throne. The town also participated in the Bohemian Revolt that opened the Thirty Years' War, housing the family of King Frederick V. After the Battle of White Mountain, that meant a defeat for the cause, the town suffered as a result of the ravages of war. Afterwards, the new Catholic possessors of Slaný, the Martinic family, erected a Baroque church and edifice that, together with a new monastery, adorn the town to this day.

From the middle of the 19th century, Slaný began to be industrialised. The industry focused primarily on the needs of agriculture.

== Demographics ==
Historical population

Year	Pop.	±%
1869	8,917	—
1880	9,835	+10.3%
1890	11,128	+13.1%
1900	11,589	+4.1%
1910	12,197	+5.2%

Year	Pop.	±%
1921	11,926	−2.2%
1930	12,792	+7.3%
1950	11,823	−7.6%
1961	12,890	+9.0%
1970	13,160	+2.1%

Year	Pop.	±%
1980	14,748	+12.1%
1991	15,285	+3.6%
2001	15,237	−0.3%
2011	15,274	+0.2%
2021	15,945	+4.4%

Source: Censuses

== Transport ==
Slaný is situated at the crossing of the Prague–Louny and Mělník–Karlovy Vary roads, near the end of the unfinished D7 motorway.

Slaný is the terminus and starting point of the railway line from/to Kralupy nad Vltavou. The town is served by two train stations.

== Education ==
Slaný is home to three secondary schools: Václav Beneš Třebízský Gymnasium, Dr. Edvard Beneš Business Academy, and Secondary Vocational School Slaný. There are five primary schools and also one primary art school.

== Sport ==
Slaný is the home venue of the motorcycle speedway club AK Slaný. Motorcycle speedway is held at the Slaný Speedway Stadium in the southeast of the town. It was opened in 1950. The venue hosted the final of the 1962 Speedway World Team Cup.

== Sights ==
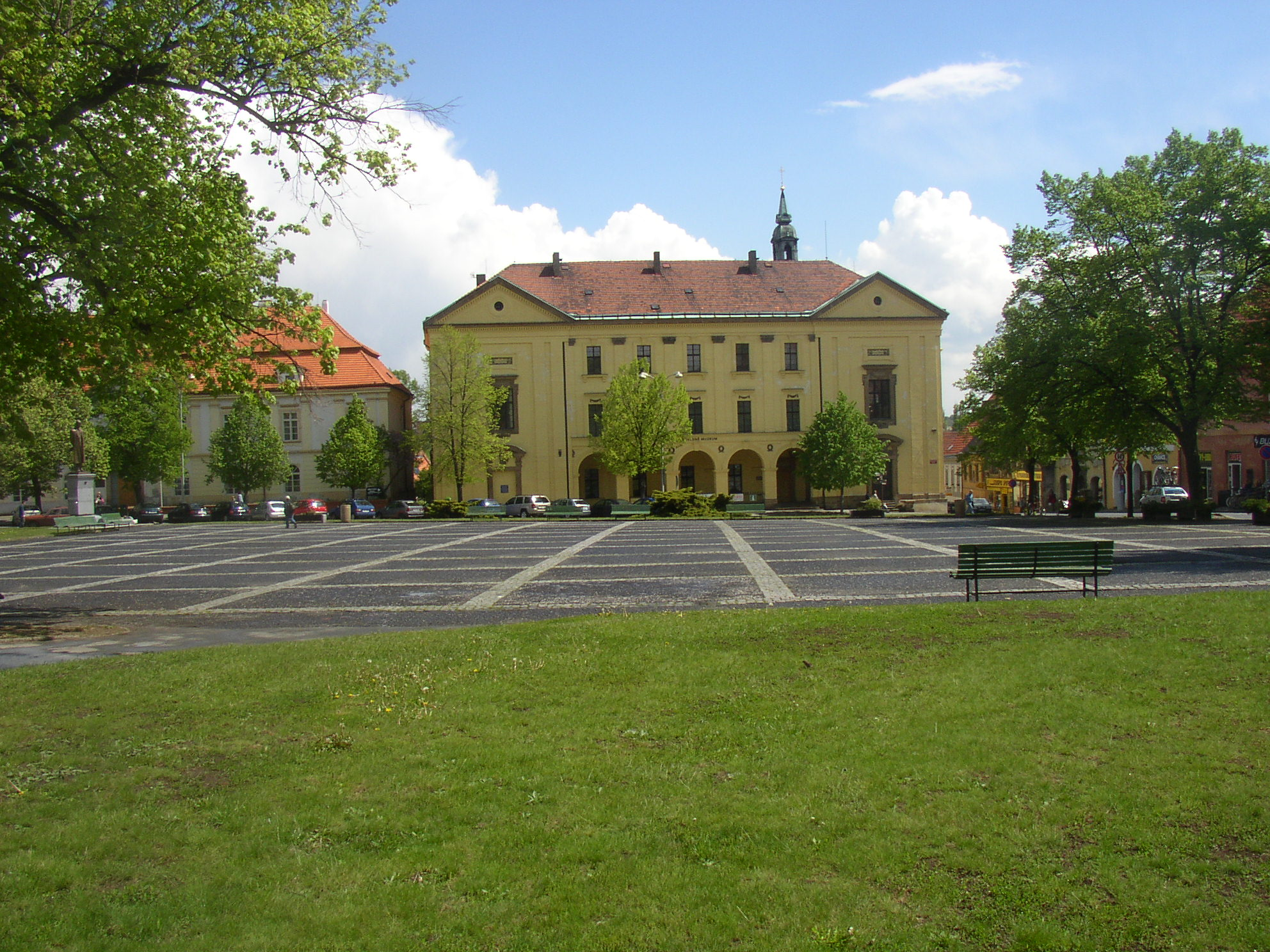
Former Piarist college

The former town hall on the town square is the main landmark of the town. It is located on the site of a house that King Charles IV donated to the town in 1378. It was burned and then rebuilt several times. Its present neo-Renaissance appearance dates from the years 1895–1896. It has a 43 metres (141 ft) high clock tower. Today it is the seat of the police and also houses an art gallery.

The second notable landmark of the town square is the former Piarist college. It was built in 1658–1665 and served students until 1939. Today it is a museum, library and cinema. The Chapel of the Espousals of the Blessed Virgin Mary is used for social events.

Velvary Gate is one of the last remnants of the town fortifications. It dates from the second half of the 15th century. Today it houses an exhibition of the town museum.

The formerly Franciscan monastery was founded in 1655 and completed in 1662. Since 1996, it has been home to the Order of Discalced Carmelites. The Church of the Holy Trinity was built in 1581–1602. The core of the church is the Loreto Chapel with a statue of the Black Mother of God, which was built in 1657.

The Church of Saint Gotthard is a Gothic deanery church located on the site of a former Romanesque basilica from the 13th century. The original Renaissance baptistery dates from 1511.

== Notable people ==
- Josef Matěj Navrátil (1798–1865), painter
- Václav Beneš Třebízský (1849–1884), priest and novelist; studied here
- Jan Malypetr (1873–1947), politician, prime minister of Czechoslovakia
- Oskar Fischer (1876–1942), psychiatrist and neuropathologist
- Olga Scheinpflugová (1902–1968), actress and writer
- Karel Smyczek (born 1950), film director and screenwriter
- Eva Urbanová (born 1961), operatic soprano
- Roman Matoušek (1964–2020), national champion speedway rider
- Martin Procházka (born 1972), ice hockey player
- Jiří Tlustý (born 1988), ice hockey player

== Twin towns – sister cities ==
Slaný is twinned with:

- Pegnitz, Germany
- Skalica, Slovakia

=== Friendly towns ===
Slaný also cooperates with:

- Bolatice, Czech Republic
- Guyancourt, France
- Linlithgow, Scotland, United Kingdom

Slaný is a part of the Commonwealth of Towns With Hussite Past and Tradition, along with other 11 Czech and 6 German municipalities.

== Gallery ==
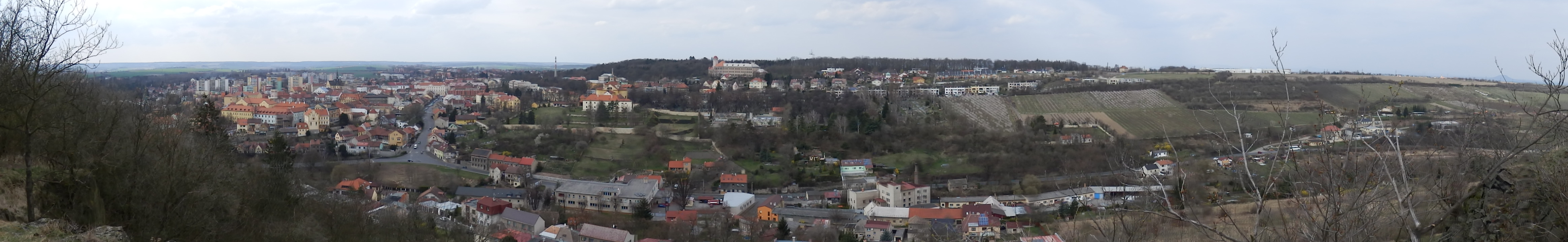
Slaný from the hill Slánská hora
