= AK Markéta Praha =

Czech motorcycle speedway team

Club information
- Track address: Markéta Stadium
- Country: Czech Republic
- League: Czech Extraliga
- Website: www.speedway-prague.cz/historie-ploche-drahy/

Club facts
- Track size: 353 metres

Major team honours
Extraliga champion (x14)	1992–1993, 1995–1998, 2000, 2003, 2012, 2014, 2017, 2019, 2020, 2022
Czechoslovak league champion (x26)	1956–1962, 1968, 1970–1977, 1979–1981, 1983, 1985–1988, 1990–1991
Extraliga runner-up (x8)	1994, 1999, 2001, 2010, 2013, 2015, 2016, 2018
Czechoslovak league runner-up (x7)	1967, 1969, 1978, 1982, 1984, 1988, 1989

Automotoklub Markéta Praha is a Czech motorcycle speedway team based in Prague, Czech Republic. The team race at the Markéta Stadium.

== History ==
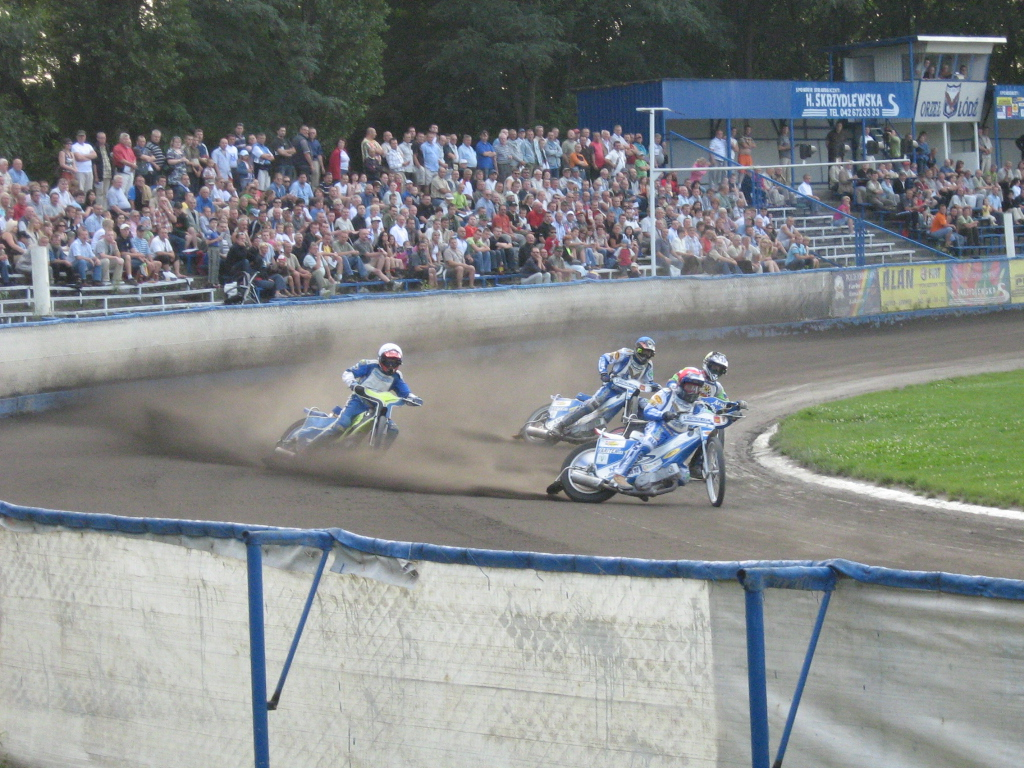
AK Markéta Praha racing in the Polish league during 2007.

Following the end of World War II, the Czechoslovak military began forming sports teams and regional and national competitions. In 1953, a law (following the Soviet model) determined that all clubs should be voluntary sports societies, with athletes being allocated to clubs according to their civic occupation. The speedway team and stadium was closely associated with the Czechoslovak police force and the speedway team started life known as Rudá Hvězda Praha (Red Star Prague). It was not until the fall of Real socialism in the Eastern Bloc countries, that the club changed its name to Olymp Praha. On 9 July 1990, the company called Autoklub Markéta at PSK Olymp Praha was established.

The team were champions of the former Czechoslovakia on 26 occasions, winning the first seven editions of the competition and then winning a further 19 times until the Dissolution of Czechoslovakia. The dominance of Prague speedway was such that the club ran two teams in the top division (Olymp Praha A and Olmyp Praha B) and another called Markéta in 1.Liga. The origins of the name Markéta is unknown.

Continuing its connection with the police, the team raced as PSK (Policejní sportovní klub) Olymp Praha (and then Olymp Praha again) competing in the Extraliga. They won the Extraliga eight times from 1992 until 2003.

In 2015, the club became known solely as AK Markéta Praha and in 2023 became champions of the country for the fourth time with the prefix Markéta.

== See also ==
- Prague Speedway
