= Svazarm =

Svazarm (Union for Cooperation with the Army)
- Svazarm (Svaz pro spolupráci s armádou); Zväzarm (Zväz pre spoluprácu s armádou)
- Formation: 1951
- Dissolved: 1990
- Type: non-governmental organization

Svazarm or Union for Cooperation with the Army (Czech: Svaz pro spolupráci s armádou / Svazarm, Slovak: Zväz pre spoluprácu s armádou / Zväzarm) was, in Communist Czechoslovakia, the largest "paramilitary" organisation, although many of the activities that Svazarm provided for its members were more reminiscent of a Boy Scout movement than of a regimented paramilitary group.

Established in 1951, the Svazarm was an almost exact copy of the Soviet Union's DOSAAF, however, with massively scaled down maritime activities as Czechoslovakia was landlocked. However, canoeing was still a popular activity. In 1985, it had about one million members, 60% of whom were under 35 years of age.

== Activities ==
The activities the Svazarm provided were extremely diverse, ranging from medical training to dog training. Dog lovers would be instructed in the training and breeding of dogs suitable for military purposes, especially German Shepherds. Shortwave radio operation was another popular activity, and was also useful for creating future radio operators in the army.

A more specialised branch of the Svazarm, based at Košice, trained pilots for the air force. Training included at least twenty flight hours of glider training and forty hours of basic training on motorised aeroplanes, as well as the necessary aviation theory.

There were also sections: Model airplanes and gliding (formally DOSLET), motor sport section (motorcycles and cars) and all sorts of shooting sports.

Svazarm also operated its own hi-fi club and record label, Čs. Hifi-klub, which distributed its releases primarily to club members. The repertoire included Czechoslovak and Warsaw Pact as well as Western artists.

== Svazarm members in the armed forces ==
The Czechoslovak military were usually less than impressed with the recruits that the Svazarm sent them, complaining that Svazarm members were "too soft" and lacked military knowledge. As military training for Svazarm members totalled 25 hours per year, and nearly all Svazarm instructors were insufficiently trained, this complaint was not unfounded.

Many Svazarm members thought that as any World War III would be fought with nuclear weapons, conventional military training was a complete waste of time and thus took up an apathetic view of the entire Svazarm enterprise.

It was also rumoured that many Svazarm trainers were not too enthusiastic themselves and would tell their students how to avoid being conscripted.
