= Oval track racing =

Form of auto racing track

Oval track racing is a form of motorsport that is contested on an oval-shaped race track. An oval track differs from a road course in that the layout resembles an oval (more precisely an ellipse or stadium), with turns in only one direction, and the direction of traffic is almost universally counterclockwise. Oval tracks are dedicated motorsport circuits, used predominantly in the United States. They often have banked turns and some, despite the name, are not precisely oval, and the shape of the track can vary.

Major forms of oval track racing include stock car racing, open-wheel racing, sprint car racing, modified car racing, midget car racing, and dirt track motorcycles.

Oval track racing is the predominant form of auto racing in the United States. According to the 2013 National Speedway Directory, the total number of oval tracks, drag strips and road courses in the United States is 1,262, with 901 of those being oval tracks and 683 of those being dirt tracks. Among the most famous oval tracks in North America are the Indianapolis Motor Speedway, Daytona International Speedway, and Charlotte Motor Speedway.

== Oval racing ==
=== History ===
While bicycle racing on oval-shaped tracks predates by several decades the automobile racing of this form, the earliest oval track auto racing may have taken place in the United States around the turn of the twentieth century. With distance endurance trials from oval tracks making news in 1905 (documenting a 52-second mile for example), and with a 1911 news report in Grand Rapids, Michigan warning would-be spectators of the dangers of uncontrolled wrecks.

=== Pack racing ===
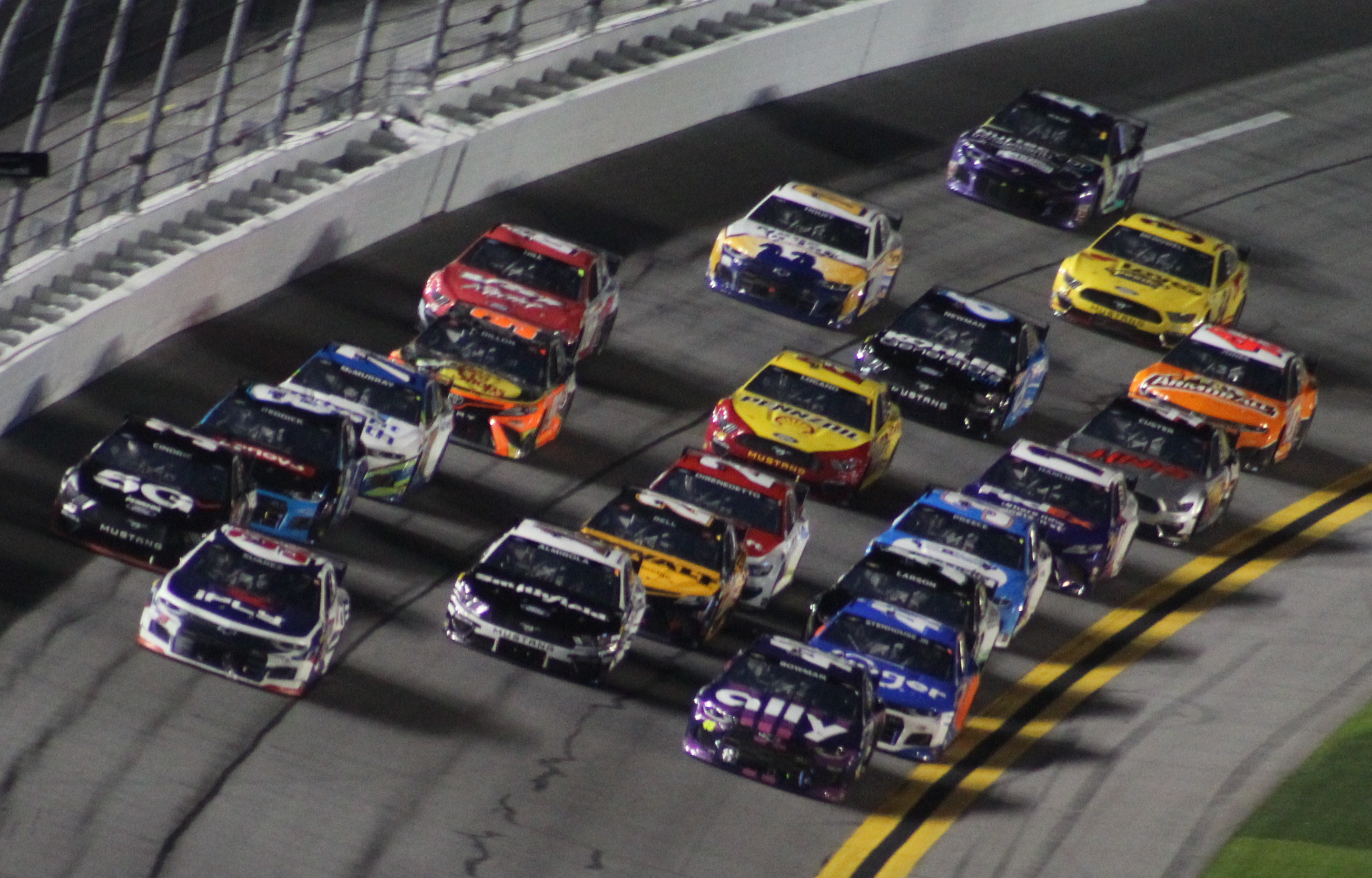
Pack racing at Daytona International Speedway (2021)

Pack racing is a phenomenon found on fast, high-banked superspeedways. It occurs when the vehicles racing are cornering at their limit of aerodynamic drag, but within their limit of traction. This allows drivers to race around the track constantly at wide open throttle. Since the vehicles are within their limit of traction, drafting through corners will not hinder a vehicle's performance. As cars running together are faster than cars running individually, all cars in the field will draft each other simultaneously in one large pack. In stock car racing this is often referred to as "restrictor plate racing" because NASCAR mandates that each car on its two longest high-banked ovals, Talladega and Daytona, use an air restrictor to reduce horsepower.

The results of pack racing may vary. As drivers are forced to race in a confined space, overtaking is very common as vehicles may travel two and three abreast. This forces drivers to use strong mental discipline in negotiating traffic. There are drawbacks, however. Should an accident occur at the front of the pack, the results could block the track in a short amount of time. This leaves drivers at the back of the pack with little time to react and little room to maneuver. The results are often catastrophic as numerous cars may be destroyed in a single accident. This type of accident is often called "The Big One".

=== Comparison with road racing ===
Oval track racing requires different tactics than road racing. While the driver does not have to shift gears nearly as frequently, brake as heavily or as often, or deal with turns of various radii in both directions as in road racing, drivers are still challenged by negotiating the track. Where there is generally one preferred line around a road course, there are many different lines that can work on an oval track. The preferred line depends on many factors including track conditions, car set-up, and traffic. The oval track driver must choose which line to use each time they approach a corner. On a short track in a 25-lap feature race, a driver might not run any two laps with the same line. Both types of racing place physical demands on the driver. A driver in an IndyCar race at Richmond Raceway may be subject to as many lateral g-forces (albeit in only one direction) as a Formula One driver at Silverstone.

Weather also plays a different role in each discipline. Road racing offers a variety of fast and slow corners that allow the use of rain tires. Paved oval tracks generally do not run with a wet track surface. Dirt ovals will sometimes support a light rain. Some tracks (e.g., Evergreen Speedway in Monroe, WA) have "rain or shine" rules requiring races to be run in the rain.

Safety has also been a point of difference between the two. While a road course usually has abundant run-off areas, gravel traps, and tire barriers, oval tracks usually have a concrete retaining wall separating the track from the fans. Innovations have been made to change this, however. The SAFER barrier was created to provide a less dangerous alternative to a traditional concrete wall. The barrier can be retrofitted onto an existing wall or may take the place of a concrete wall completely.

== Track classification ==
Oval tracks are classified based upon their size, surface, banking, and shape.

=== By size ===
Their size can range from only a few hundred feet to over two and a half miles. The definitions used to differentiate track sizes have changed over the years. While some tracks use terms such as "speedway" or "superspeedway" in their name, they may not meet the specific definitions used in this article.

==== Short track ====
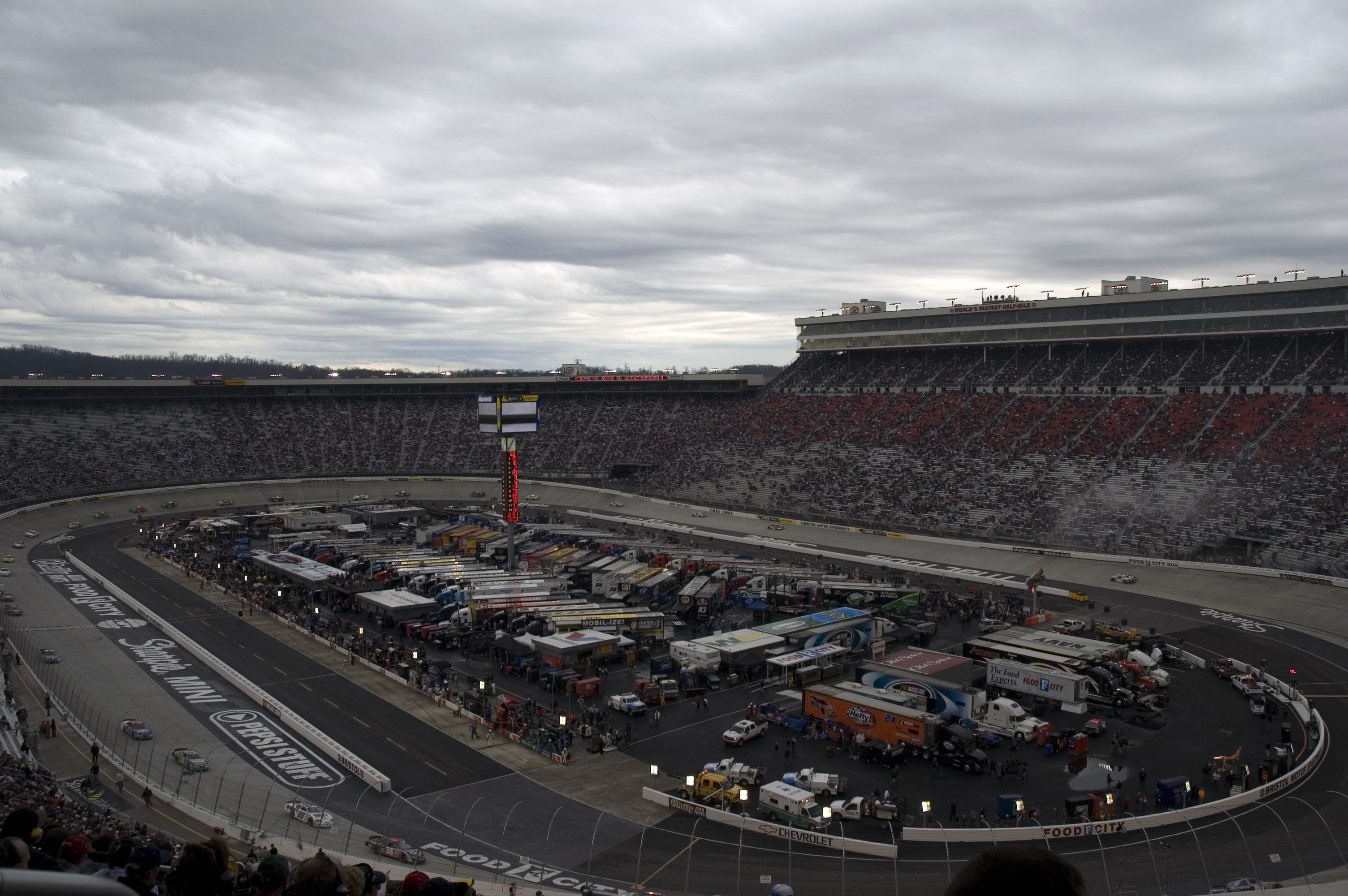
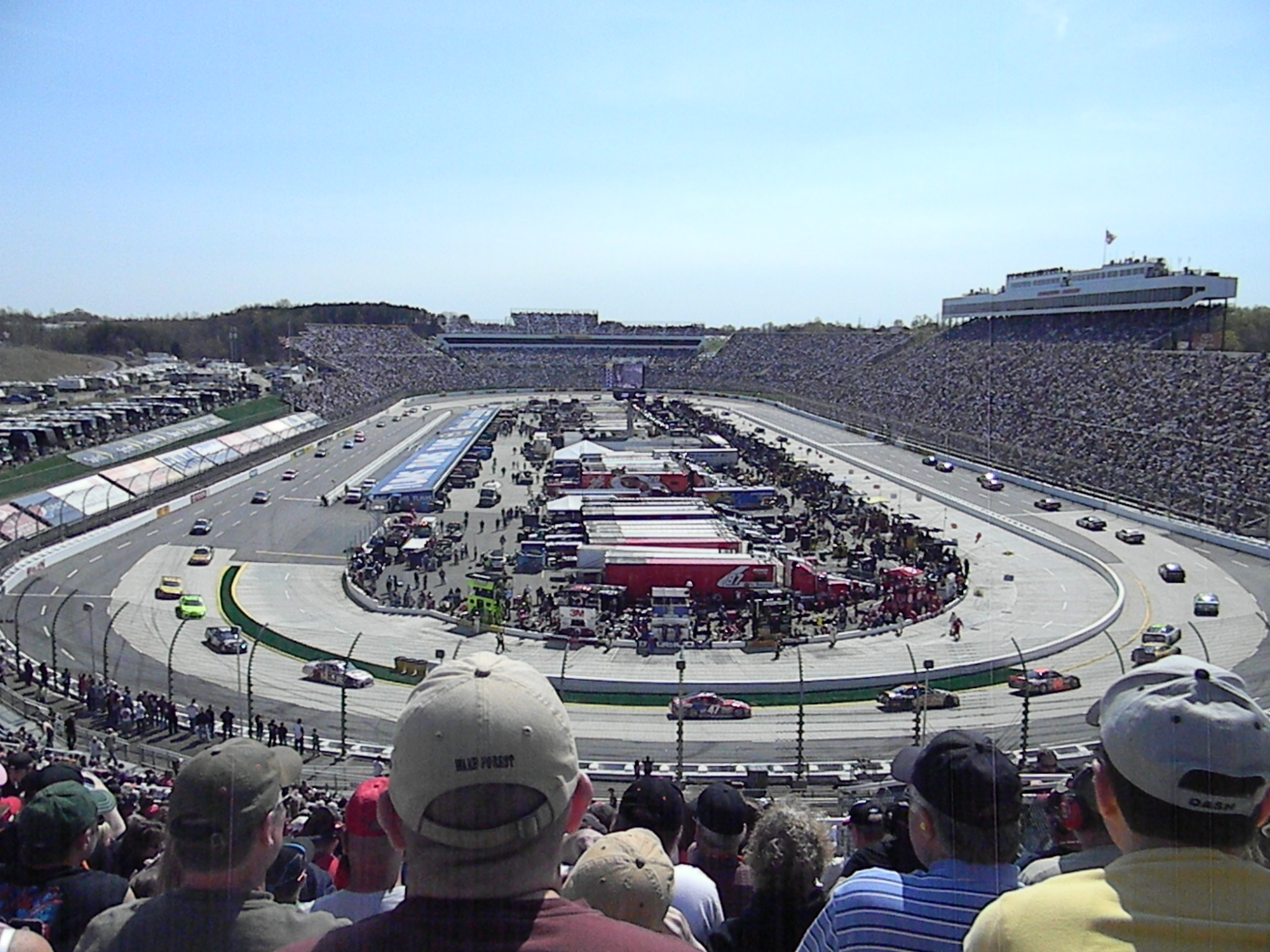
Bristol Motor Speedway (left) and Martinsville Speedway (right)

A short track is an oval track less than one mile (1.6 km) long, with the majority being 0.5 miles (0.8 km) or shorter. Drivers seeking careers in oval track racing generally serve their apprenticeship on short tracks before moving up to series which compete on larger tracks. Due to their short length and fast action, these tracks are often nicknamed "bullrings". Professional-level NASCAR races on short tracks usually use a 500-lap or 400-lap distance. Short tracks in many cases have lights installed and routinely host night races. The short ovals still form the backbone of NASCAR in the feeder series. Six race tracks of this type are also represented in the top-level NASCAR Cup Series: Bowman Gray Stadium, Bristol, Iowa, Martinsville, North Wilkesboro and Richmond.

==== Mile oval ====
A 1-mile (1.61 km) oval is a popular and common length for oval track racing. The exact measurements, however, can vary by as much as a tenth of a mile and still fall into this category. Most mile ovals are relatively flat-banked, with Dover being a notable exception.

Many 1-mile dirt ovals were used by stock cars or champ cars before race tracks with dirt surfaces were removed from the racing calendar in the early 1970s. Many of these racetracks got the nickname "Fairgrounds” — for example Arizona State Fairgrounds, California State Fairgrounds and Michigan State Fairgrounds Speedway. The origin of these racetracks was in harness racing, which commonly used 1-mile tracks. Also, the oldest oval race track, the Milwaukee Mile was originally a race track for horse racing.

In NASCAR, 1-mile oval tracks are among the intermediate tracks. IndyCar rates these tracks as short ovals, since IndyCar does not usually run on ovals shorter than 1 mile, with the exception of Sanair, Richmond and Iowa. The 1-mile ovals have lost a great deal of their former importance for oval racing. Most of the racetracks abandoned by NASCAR or IndyCar in the 2000s were of this type. These include the Chicago Motor Speedway and the Walt Disney World Speedway, which were built during the 1990s construction boom but used for only four years. The historic Nazareth Speedway, which was paved in 1986, was completely abandoned after the 2004 season. Physically, many mile oval still exist such as the Rockingham Speedway and the Pikes Peak International Raceway. However, these racetracks have not been used by nationally important motorsports events for years. There are only three 1-mile tracks left on the NASCAR racing calendar: Phoenix, Loudon, and Dover. IndyCar only returned to 1-mile oval racing with the addition of the Milwaukee Mile in 2024 after 9 years of it being off the schedule.

==== Intermediate ====
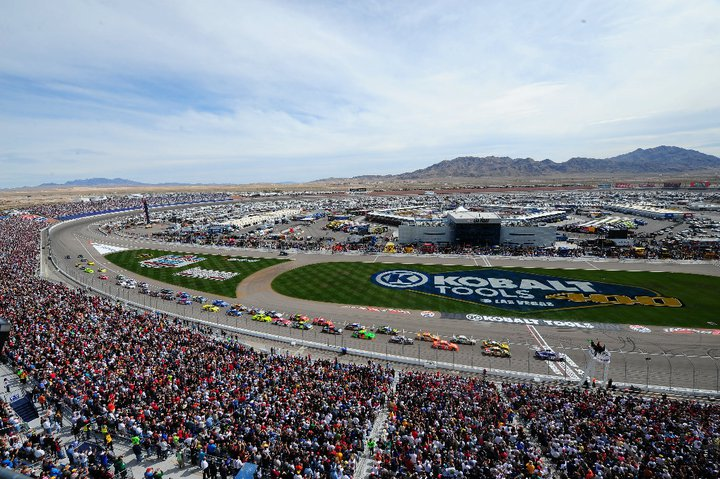
Las Vegas Motor Speedway (2011)

Also referred to with the general term of "speedway", these courses are 1 to 2 miles (1.6 to 3.2 km) in length, but the term is particularly reserved for 1.5-mile (2.4 km) tracks. At the beginning of the history of NASCAR and IndyCar, this oval size was not very common. Until 1990, there were only five examples. Two of these, the Marchbanks Speedway (1.4 miles) and the Trenton Speedway (1.5 miles), were demolished in the 1970s and 1980s, and only three—Charlotte Motor Speedway, Atlanta Motor Speedway and Darlington Raceway—have survived to this day. All other ovals of this type were built after 1994. During the race track construction boom of the late 1990s, these tracks began to be labeled with the rather derogatory term "cookie cutter" tracks, as their differences were perceived to be minimal.

In 1992, Charlotte became the first intermediate track to install lights and allow for night racing. It is now commonplace for these types of tracks to host night races. Intermediate tracks usually have moderate to steep banking. Many tracks that are still used in NASCAR today are of this type. Since their size allows them to compromise high speeds with sightlines, especially tri- and quad-ovals of 1.5-mile length have become commonplace in major racing series that use oval tracks.

While intermediate speedways were designed primarily with stock cars in mind, they were also believed to be suited to host Indy cars as well. In the early years of the Indy Racing League, the series visited several intermediate tracks. The higher-downforce, normally aspirated IRL-type cars proved to be competitive at several of the tracks. The CART series however, mostly stayed away as the faster, more powerful Champ Cars were generally thought to be too fast for this type of circuit. This became evident at the 2001 Firestone Firehawk 600, when drivers experienced vertigo-like symptoms, and the race was cancelled for safety reasons. These tracks began to be removed from the Indy car schedule in the late-2000s and early-2010s due to low crowds and serious crashes, including the fatal accident involving Dan Wheldon at Las Vegas in 2011. As of 2026, the IndyCar Series abandoned all intermediates with only exception of Nashville Superspeedway (1.33 miles).

==== Superspeedway ====
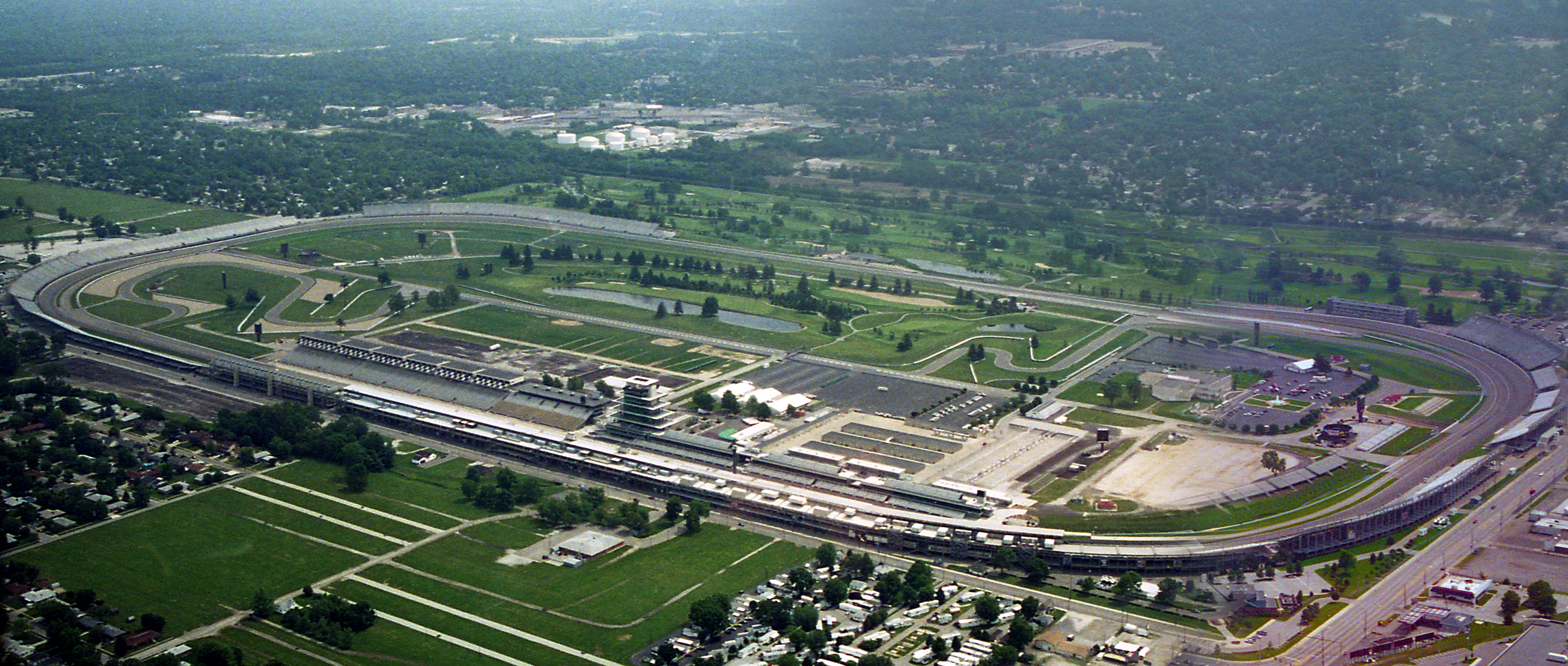
Indianapolis Motor Speedway (left) and the Talladega Superspeedway (right)

Originally a superspeedway was an oval race track with a length of one mile or more. Since the introduction of the intermediate oval, Superspeedway is an oval race course of 2 miles or longer. There are five active superspeedways in the United States, the most famous being Indianapolis Motor Speedway and Daytona International Speedway, both 2.5 miles (4.0 km) long. These tracks were built in 1909 and 1959 respectively. Indianapolis Motor Speedway was built as a facility for the automotive industry to conduct research and development. Daytona International Speedway was built as a replacement for the Daytona Beach Road Course, which combined the town's main street and its famous beach. Daytona hosts the Daytona 500, NASCAR's most prestigious race, while the Indianapolis Motor Speedway is home to the Indianapolis 500 and the Brickyard 400.

The longest superspeedway in North America is the Talladega Superspeedway in Lincoln, Alabama. Built in 1969, it is 2.66 miles (4.28 kilometers) long, and holds the current record (set in 1987) for fastest speed in a stock car: lapping at an average of 216.309 mph (348.116 km/h) and reaching 228 mph (367 km/h) at the end of the backstretch. The later closed and partially demolished Texas World Speedway, was the site of Mario Andretti's closed-course record of 214.158 mph (344.654 km/h) which was set in 1973. The California Speedway was the site of Gil de Ferran's qualifying lap of 241.428 mph (388.541 km/h) in the CART FedEx Championship Series in 2000, the fastest qualifying lap recorded at an official race meeting.

Other superspeedways used by NASCAR include the Michigan International Speedway, the sister track of Texas World Speedway, as well as Pocono Raceway and Ontario Motor Speedway. Michigan Speedway, Texas World Speedway and the now-closed California Speedway are often considered intermediate tracks by NASCAR due to their similarities with 1.5-mile tracks, while Ontario, Pocono and Indianapolis are classified separately, as they are the only long, flat tracks on the schedule. Apart from Talladega, the IndyCars also ran at least one race on all superspeedways which NASCAR uses. Due to the low number of spectators or safety concerns by the drivers, IndyCar no longer uses super speedways outside of Indianapolis. In NASCAR they are still an essential part of the racing calendar.

Texas World Speedway and Ontario Motor Speedway were abolished by NASCAR and IndyCar in the 1980s, the California Speedway was closed and demolished in the 2020s. As of 2025, all other superspeedways are still open and are still being used for racing.

==== Track length disputes ====
NASCAR and IndyCar use different measuring systems to measure the oval race tracks. As a result, the racetracks have lengths of different accuracy. The following table shows the values that NASCAR, IndyCar and CART/CCWS used to determine the lap speeds and track records.

Track	NASCAR measurement	IndyCar measurement	CART/CCWS measurement
Auto Club Speedway	2.000 miles (3.219 km)	2.000 miles (3.219 km)	2.029 miles (3.265 km)
Chicago Motor Speedway	1.000 mile (1.609 km)	-	1.029 miles (1.656 km)
Chicagoland Speedway	1.500 miles (2.414 km)	1.520 miles (2.446 km)	-
World Wide Technology Raceway	1.250 miles (2.012 km)	1.250 miles (2.012 km)	1.270 miles (2.044 km)
Homestead–Miami Speedway	1.500 miles (2.414 km)	1.485 miles (2.390 km)	1.502 miles (2.417 km)
Iowa Speedway	0.875 miles (1.408 km)	0.894 miles (1.439 km)	-
Kansas Speedway	1.500 miles (2.414 km)	1.520 miles (2.446 km)	-
Kentucky Speedway	1.500 miles (2.414 km)	1.480 miles (2.382 km)	-
Las Vegas Motor Speedway	1.500 miles (2.414 km)	1.544 miles (2.485 km)	1.500 miles (2.414 km)
Milwaukee Mile	1.000 mile (1.609 km)	1.015 miles (1.633 km)	1.032 miles (1.661 km)
Nashville Superspeedway	1.330 miles (2.140 km)	1.333 miles (2.145 km)	-
Nazareth Speedway	1.000 mile (1.609 km)	0.935 miles (1.505 km)	0.946 miles (1.522 km)
New Hampshire Motor Speedway	1.058 miles (1.703 km)	1.025 miles (1.650 km)	1.058 miles (1.703 km)
Phoenix Raceway	1.000 mile (1.609 km)	1.022 miles (1.645 km)	1.000 mile (1.609 km)
Texas Motor Speedway	1.500 miles (2.414 km)	1.455 miles (2.342 km)	1.482 miles (2.385 km)
Mobility Resort Motegi	1.549 miles (2.493 km)	1.520 miles (2.446 km)	1.548 miles (2.491 km)

=== By shape ===
A typical oval track consists of two parallel straights, connected by two 180° turns. Although most ovals generally have only two radii curves, they are usually advertised and labeled as four 90° turns. While many oval tracks conform to the traditional symmetrical design, asymmetrical tracks are not uncommon.

==== Classical geometric shapes ====
Shape	Description	Examples			
Shape	Description	Short Track	Mile Oval	Intermediate	Superspeedway
Paper clip oval	One sub-classification of the traditional oval shape is the "paper clip" oval. The layout consists of two long straights, connected by two sharp, tight-radius turns, giving the track a shape resembling a paper clip. The courses are usually very challenging, and usually offer little banking, making the turns very slow and tight to maneuver. This is the classic layout of short tracks or mile ovals. Most short tracks are paper clips. But there exist some tracks about 1 mile length with this shape, too.	Martinsville Speedway	Chicago Motor Speedway	Autódromo Miguel E. Abed	Autódromo Ciudad de Rafaela
Stadium oval	One sub-classification of the traditional oval shape is the "stadium" oval. In contrast to the paperclip, the straight lines are relatively short compared with the curves. It is the form closest to a circle. The curves usually have high banking.	Bristol Motor Speedway	Dover Motor Speedway	Homestead (altered design)	
Rounded-off rectangle or square	A once prominent, but now uncommon shape is the "rounded-off rectangle". Pursuant to its name, the track shape resembles a rectangle, with two long straights and two short straights, connected by four separate turns. The primary characteristic of a rounded-off rectangle that differentiates it from a traditional oval shape, is the presence of two "short chutes", one between turns one and two, and one between turns three and four. While most traditional ovals have two continuous 180° radii (advertised as four 90° turns), this shape actually has four distinct 90° curves. When it was first constructed, the Homestead–Miami Speedway was designed to this layout and touted as a "mini-Indy." However, at only 1.5 miles (one mile shorter than Indy), the track proved to be uncompetitive, owing largely to the sharp corners, and was soon reconfigured as a traditional oval. Indianapolis remains as the only major track to this specification. Tracks of this shape have been avoided due to grandstand sight line issues, slow corners, and dangerous impact angles. However, numerous private manufacturers' test tracks use this type of layout. The only major short track with a rectangular layout has the shape of a rounded-off square with four nearly identical straights and turns.	Flemington Speedway, a square	-	Homestead Miami Speedway original design	Indianapolis Motor Speedway
Rounded-off trapezoid	A very rare layout is a trapezoid oval course. The difference to rounded-off rectangle is the shorter back straight and longer front straight. So, the Turns 1 and 4 are tighter than the Turns 2 and 3.	-	-	Emerson Fittipaldi Speedway	-
Rounded-off triangle	The classic triangular layout is rare in oval courses, too. Technically, there are tri-ovals. In the strict sense, the modern oval tracks are called tri-oval, which rather are similar to a D. See next section. The Pocono Raceway is a triangular course with three distinct, widely varying turns. Due to its layout the "Pocono Raceway" is often described with the words: "It is an oval course, which drives like a road course." The triangle is a popular oval shape outside the United States. There are some triangular oval tracks in Canada, Germany and Mexico.	Sanair Super Speedway, an equilateral triangle	-	Marchbanks Speedway	Pocono Raceway

==== Tri-ovals ====
The tri-oval is the common shape of the ovals from the construction booms of the 1960s and 1990s. The use of the tri-oval shape for automobile racing was conceived by Bill France Sr. during the planning for Daytona. The triangular layout allowed fans in the grandstands an angular perspective of the cars coming towards and moving away from their vantage point. Traditional ovals (such as Indianapolis) offered only limited linear views of the course, and required fans to look back and forth much like a tennis match. The tri-oval shape prevents fans from having to "lean" to see oncoming cars, and creates more forward sight lines. The modern tri-ovals were often called as cookie cutters because of their (nearly) identical shape and identical kind of races.

Shape	Description	Examples			
Shape	Description	Short Track	Mile Oval	Intermediate	Superspeedway
Tri-oval	A tri-oval resembles an isosceles triangle with rounded-off corners. The circuits typically have a straight backstretch, while the main straightaway where the pit area and most grandstands are located, has a "tri-oval" curve (sometimes characterized as a fifth curve) that makes the mainstretch skewed. Tri-ovals have become preferable to track builders as they offer superior sightlines. Generally on tri-ovals the start-finish line is located on the apex of the tri-oval curve. Two exceptions are Talladega and Walt Disney World Speedway, where the start-finish line are located on the straight between the curve and turn one.	Tri-City Raceway	Walt Disney World Speedway	Las Vegas Motor Speedway	Daytona International Speedway
Quad-oval	A tri-oval with a "double dogleg" is often called a "quad-oval". A quad-oval is very similar to a tri-oval in sightlines and layout. One specific feature is that the start-finish line segment actually falls on a straight section, rather than along a curve. The shape has become a signature for Speedway Motorsports, which owns all major quad-ovals in the United States. The Calder Park Thunderdome in Melbourne, Australia, is also an example of a quad-oval speedway, though since its opening in 1987 it has generally been referred to as a tri-oval. The Rockingham Speedway is a special case because it can be interpreted as a D-oval as well as a tri-oval or quad-oval. The front line is laid out as an asymmetrical curve, which contains two faint kinks with start-finish-line is next to second kink.	Birmingham International Raceway	Rockingham Speedway	Charlotte Motor Speedway	-
D-shaped oval	A variation of tri-oval is the "D-shaped oval". Similar to a tri-oval, a D-shaped oval has a straight backstretch, but a long, sweeping frontstretch, giving the circuit a layout resembling the letter D. The shape originated with a pair of sister tracks built in the 1960s: Michigan International Speedway and Texas World Speedway. Initially, this design has been used only for superspeedways. But there are now some short tracks with this shape, too. For example, the Richmond Raceway was rebuilt in 1986 from a 0.542 mi stadium oval to an 0.750 mi D-shaped oval. The most famous short track, which was explicitly designed as a D-oval from the scratch, was the Iowa Speedway, which opened in 2006.	Iowa Speedway	Pikes Peak International Raceway	-	Michigan International Speedway

==== Unique shapes ====
There are a lot of oval tracks, which neither have a classical geometric shape nor still represent a modern tri-oval in the strict sense. While these courses still technically fall under the category of ovals, their unique shape, flat corners, hard braking zones, or increased difficulty, often produces driving characteristics similar to those of a road course.

Shape	Description	Examples		
Egg-shape	An egg-shaped oval largely corresponds to the classical form, however, the two straights are arranged non-parallel. This results in the two curves having different radii. These tracks are either designed this way, or were constructed this way due to constraints. Darlington, the most famous example of the egg-shape, was built with such a skew so as not to disturb an existing a minnow pond that once existed at one end.	World Wide Technology Raceway	Darlington Raceway	Twin Ring Motegi
Dogleg	Some oval tracks have minor variations, such as kinks or doglegs. A "dogleg" is a defined as a soft curve down one of the straights (typically inward), which warps the oval into a non-symmetric or non-traditional shape. While the extra curve would seemingly give the oval five turns, the dogleg is normally omitted from identification, and the ovals are still labeled with four turns.	I-70 Speedway	Nazareth Speedway	Phoenix Raceway
Kidney-bean-shape	A Kidney-bean-shape had a unique right-hand dogleg. Apart from that the track is largely classical or Egg shaped.	Trenton Speedway	Brooklands Circuit	

==== Concentric oval track / legends oval ====
Some facilities feature several ovals track of different sizes, often sharing part of the same front straightaway. The now defunct Ascot Speedway featured 1/2 mile and 1/4 mile dirt oval tracks, and Irwindale Speedway features 1/2 mile and 1/3 mile concentric paved oval tracks. Pocono Raceway once had a 3/4 mile oval which connected to the main stretch, and circled around the garage area.

In 1991, Charlotte Motor Speedway connected the quad oval start-finish straight to the pit lane with two 180 degree turns, resulting in a concentric 1/4-mile oval layout. The 1/4-mile layout became a popular venue for legends car racing. The name "legends oval" was derived from this use. They have also seen use with go-karts, short track stock cars, and other lower disciplines. This idea was adopted by numerous tracks including Texas Motor Speedway, Atlanta Motor Speedway, Kentucky Speedway, Las Vegas Motor Speedway, and Iowa Speedway which has a 1/8 mile version.

Perhaps the most unusual concentric oval facility is Dover Speedway-Dover Downs. The one-mile oval track encompasses a 0.625-mile harness racing track inside.

=== By banking / superelevation ===
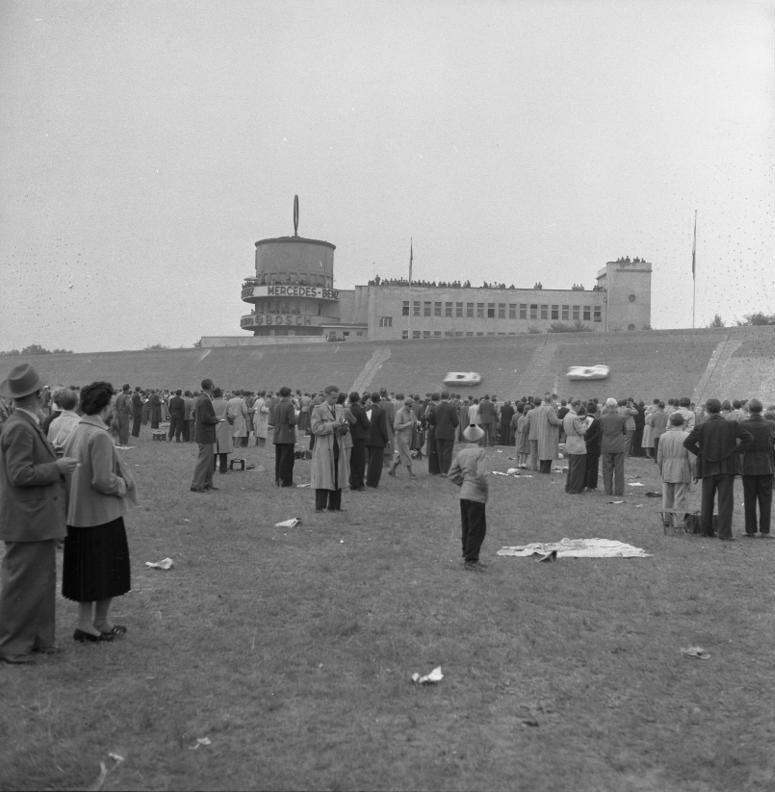
41° banking of AVUS, Germany (1955)

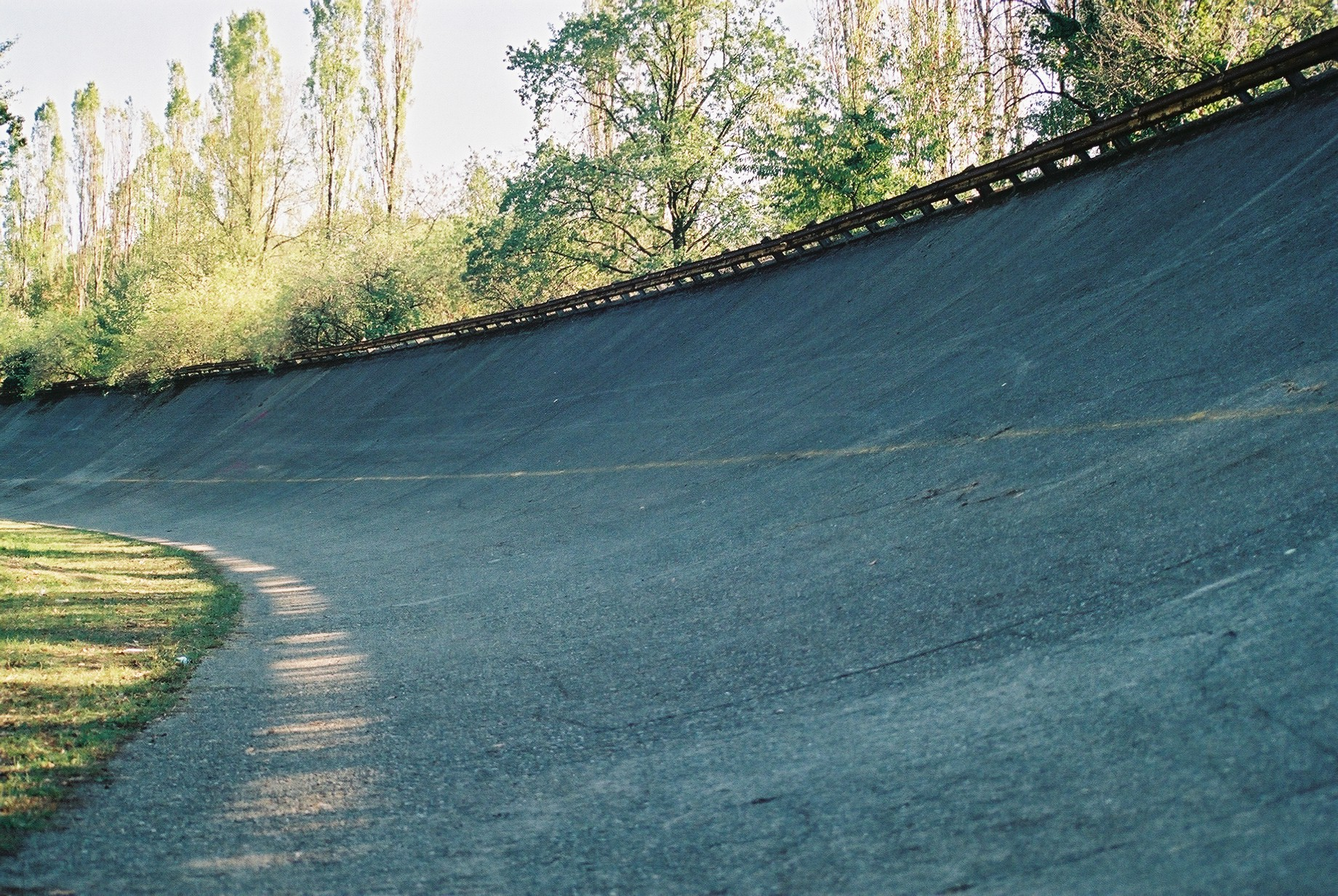
38.69°-maximum progressive banking of Monza, Italy (2007)

Oval tracks usually have sloping in both straights and curves, albeit with a gentler slope on the straights. Oval circuits without any corner banking are rare; low-slope circuits are usually old or small tracks; high bank angles are more common in new circuits.

Circuits like Milwaukee Mile and Indianapolis Motor Speedway have 9° banking in the turns and are considered low banked. Superspeedways like Talladega, with up to 33° of tilt in curves, or Daytona, with up to 32°, are considered high banked. Atlanta is the intermediate track with the highest banking, at 28°. Winchester has the highest banking of any active oval track, with 37°.

Some circuits with highly-banked curves use progressive banking, where the banking steepens towards the outside of the curve, such as Las Vegas Motor Speedway, with 12° of banking at the inside edge of the track's curves and 20° at its outer edge, or the oval of Monza Circuit, whose corner banking increases from flat at the inside edge of its curves to 38.69° at the outer edge.

	Shorttrack	Intermediate		Superspeedway
	(< 1.00 mile)	(1.00 – 1.30 miles)	(1.30 – 2.00 miles)	(>= 2.0 miles)
flat (< 4°)	Bowman Gray Stadium; Sanair Super Speedway Foxhall Stadium	Autódromo Hermanos Rodríguez; Autódromo Miguel E. Abed; Mallory Park	Emerson Fittipaldi Speedway	
low banked (4° – 8°)	Adelaide International Raceway; Flemington Speedway; Greenville-Pickens Speedway; Nazareth Speedway; Raceway Venray	Chicago Motor Speedway; New Hampshire Motor Speedway	Rockingham Motor Speedway	EuroSpeedway Lausitz
semi-banked (8° – 12°)	EcoCentro Expositor Querétaro; Evergreen Speedway; Jukasa Motor Speedway; Martinsville Speedway; Memphis International Raceway; Tours Speedway	Gateway International Raceway; Milwaukee Mile; Phoenix International Raceway; Pikes Peak International Raceway; Walt Disney World Speedway	Phakisa Freeway; Twin Ring Motegi	Indianapolis Motor Speedway; Ontario Motor Speedway
banked (12° – 16°)	Autódromo Chiapas; Indianapolis Raceway Park; Iowa Speedway; Myrtle Beach Speedway; North Wilkesboro Speedway; Oswego Speedway; Richmond Raceway; Thompson International Speedway; USA International Speedway		Nashville Superspeedway; Trenton Speedway	Autódromo Ciudad de Rafaela; Auto Club Speedway; Pocono Raceway
high banked (16° – 20°)	El Dorado Speedway; Fairgrounds Speedway; Ovalo Aguascalientes México; Trióvalo Bernardo Obregón		Chicagoland Speedway; Homestead–Miami Speedway (progressive 18°–20°); Kansas Speedway (progressive 17°–20°); Kentucky Speedway; Las Vegas Motor Speedway (progressive 12°–20°)	Michigan International Speedway
very high banked (> 20°)	Birmingham International Raceway; Bristol Motor Speedway; I-70 Speedway; Salem Speedway; Winchester Speedway	Calder Park Thunderdome; Dover International Speedway; Rockingham Speedway; Sitges-Terramar	Atlanta Motor Speedway; Autodrome de Linas-Montlhéry; Charlotte Motor Speedway; Darlington Raceway; Hanford Motor Speedway; Texas Motor Speedway	AVUS; Brooklands; Daytona International Speedway; Monza Circuit (progressive 0°–38.69°); Talladega Superspeedway; Texas World Speedway

=== By surface ===
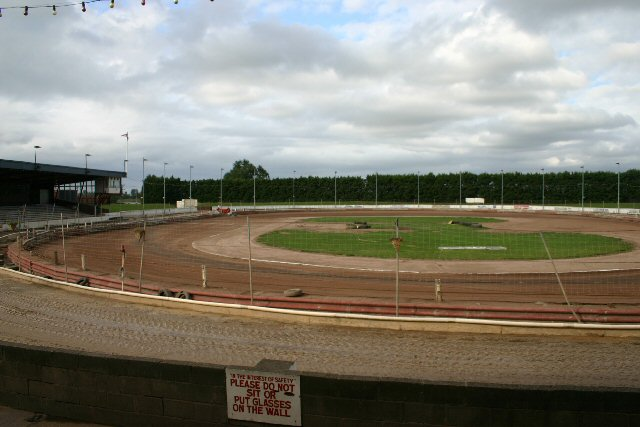
A dirt oval track used for stock car racing and Banger racing – Mildenhall Stadium, Suffolk, England (2006)

Track surfaces can be dirt, concrete, asphalt, or a combination of concrete and asphalt. Some ovals in the early twentieth century had wood surfaces. Indianapolis Motor Speedway's track surface used to be made entirely of bricks, and today, 3 feet (0.91 m), or one yard, of original bricks remain exposed at the start-finish line. Each was hand laid over a 2-inch (51 mm) cushion of sand, then leveled and the gaps filled with mortar. Before the work was completed, locals nicknamed the track "The Brickyard".

== Combined road course ==
A combined road course, colloquially referred to as a "roval" (a blend word combining "road course" and "oval") is an oval track racing facility that features a road course in the infield (and/or outfield), that is usually linked to the oval circuit. This type of course makes for a multi-purpose track, and allows the facility to be used for both oval and road racing. A typical combined road course consists of the oval portion of the track, using the same start/finish line, and same pit area, but a mid-course diversion to a winding road circuit in the infield (and/or outfield). At some point, the circuit leads back to the main oval, and completes the rest of the lap. On some of the faster ovals, a chicane is present on long back-straights, to keep speeds down, and create additional braking/passing zones. Some more complex facilities feature a stand-alone road course layout(s) in the infield not directly linked to the oval layout, or otherwise using only a short portion of the oval.

Combined road courses combine the high speed characteristics of ovals with the technical precision of road courses. It allows road racing disciplines the unique experience of being held in the stadium style atmosphere of an oval superspeedway. Numerous combined road courses saw widespread use with sports cars in the 1970s and early 1980s. However, their use at the professional level has since diminished considerably, since most layouts lacked the desirable topography and competitive challenges of natural road courses. In addition, most combined road course circuits offer poor sightlines for fans sitting in the grandstands. Oftentimes the challenging infield portion is obscured or not visible at all from the grandstands that line the circumference of the oval track, so many fans choose to view from the ground level inside the infield – leaving the grandstands mostly empty and unsightly.

Many combined road course layouts have been abandoned. However, some have enjoyed extended life as venues for testing, driving schools, and amateur race meets. Since 1962, the most famous race continuously held on a combined road course has been the 24 Hours of Daytona. Since 2018, NASCAR has held the Bank of America Roval 400 on a combined course at Charlotte. A second, one-off race at Daytona's combined course was also present in NASCAR's calendar in 2020 and 2021.

In some rare examples, the combined road course layout is run in the opposite direction to the oval circuit. For instance, at Indianapolis the oval is run counter-clockwise, but the combined road course used during the IndyCar Series Grand Prix of Indianapolis is run clockwise. However the MotoGP races were run counter-clockwise, with some reconfigured corners to fix corner apex problems. Michigan was also an example of a clockwise combined road course. Another example is the Adelaide International Raceway in Australia which combines a 2.41 km (1.50 mi) road course with an 0.805 km (0.500 mi) speedway bowl. The Bowl forms a permanent part of the road course and also runs clockwise. At many tracks, multiple configurations are available for the combined road course layout(s).

An example of an outfield combined road course can be seen at the Calder Park Raceway in Melbourne, Australia. The Calder Park complex has a 1.119 mi (1.801 km) high-banked oval speedway called the Thunderdome as well as a separate road course. The road course and the oval can be linked via two short roads that connect the front straight of the road course to the back straight of the oval. As they are separate tracks, this creates a unique situation where different races can actually be run on both the oval and the full road course at the same time. Also unique is that unlike most combined circuits which use the oval track's start/finish line and pits, in the case of Calder Park it is the road course start/finish line and pits that are used. This configuration was used only twice (both in 1987) and has not been used for major motor racing since hosting Round 9 of the 1987 World Touring Car Championship.

Prominent examples:

Charlotte Motor Speedway, a quad-oval, with its infield road course

The combined road course layout at Daytona used for the Rolex 24

Calder Park Raceway in Australia, an outfield combined road course

Indianapolis Motor Speedway road course

1955-1965 Monza Circuit combined course, with a road course crossing from the outfield into the infield and run sequentially with the full oval

Autódromo Hermanos Rodríguez (Mexico City) Grand Prix circuit, with separate outfield and infield road-course segments

== Oval track construction booms in North America ==
There have been two distinct oval race track construction "booms" in the United States. The first took place in the 1960s, and the second took place in the mid-to-late 1990s. The majority of tracks from the 1960s boom and the 1990s boom have survived, but some tracks failed to achieve long-term financial success. Incidentally, these two booms loosely coincided with the similar construction boom of the baseball/football cookie-cutter stadiums of the 1960s and 1970s, and the subsequent sport-specific stadium construction boom that began in the 1990s.

=== Tracks built during the 1960s boom ===
Current

- Daytona International Speedway (1959)
- Atlanta Motor Speedway (1960; substantially reconstructed in 1997; reprofiled in 2022)
- Charlotte Motor Speedway (1960)
- North Carolina Motor Speedway (1965)
- Dover International Speedway (1966)
- Michigan International Speedway (1968)
- Talladega Superspeedway (1969)
- Pocono Raceway (1971)

Former

- Marchbanks Speedway (short oval exists since 1951, intermediate tri-oval build 1960; facility closed and demolished 1970)
- Texas World Speedway (1969; primarily amateur racing and testing from 1981–2016; closed 2017, demolished in 2020)
- Trenton Speedway (mile oval exists since 1946, intermediate dogleg oval build 1969; facility closed 1980; track demolished in 1981)
- Ontario Motor Speedway (1970; demolished in 1980)

=== Tracks built during the 1990s boom ===
Current

- Homestead–Miami Speedway (1995)
- Las Vegas Motor Speedway (1996)
- Texas Motor Speedway (1996)
- World Wide Technology Raceway (1997)
- Kentucky Speedway (2000; no race since 2021)
- Kansas Speedway (2001)
- Chicagoland Speedway (2001; closed in 2020 due to COVID-19 pandemic, O'Reilly and Cup Series made return in 2026.)
- Nashville Superspeedway (2001; closed 2011, reopened 2021)
- Iowa Speedway (2006; closed in 2020 due to COVID-19 pandemic, held only ARCA Menards Series in 2021, IndyCar returned in 2022, Xfinity Series returned in 2024 and Cup made debut in 2024.)

Former

- Walt Disney World Speedway (1996; demolished 2015–2016)
- California Speedway (1997; superspeedway closed and partially demolished in 2023 for planned new short track)
- Memphis International Raceway (1998; closed in 2022; is to be demolished)
- Chicago Motor Speedway (1999; demolished in 2009)
- Pikes Peak International Raceway (1997; Oval track scheduled to close in 2026.)

== International oval tracks ==
Most of the oval tracks are located in the United States, Mexico, and Canada. However, there are also many oval tracks elsewhere, as listed below.

=== Current ===
- Adelaide International Raceway in Australia, 0.805 kilometres (0.500 mi) short track
- Autodrome de Linas-Montlhéry in France, 2.540 kilometres (1.578 mi) intermediate oval
- Autódromo Internacional de Luanda in Angola, 3.208 kilometres (1.993 mi) rectangular oval
- Autódromo Ciudad de Rafaela in Argentina, 4.624 kilometres (2.873 mi) superspeedway
- Bahrain International Circuit in Bahrain, 2.500 kilometres (1.553 mi) intermediate oval
- Calder Park Thunderdome in Australia, 1.801 kilometres (1.119 mi) intermediate quad-oval
- EuroSpeedway Lausitz in Germany, 3.256 kilometres (2.023 mi) triangular superspeedway
- Foxhall Stadium in the United Kingdom, 0.382 kilometres (0.237 mi)
- Highlands Motorsport Park in New Zealand, 1.133 kilometres (0.704 mi) short track
- Mallory Park in the United Kingdom, 1.609 kilometres (1.000 mi) intermediate oval
- Penbay International Circuit in Taiwan, 0.95 kilometres (0.59 mi) short track tri-oval
- Phakisa Freeway in South Africa, 2.414 kilometres (1.500 mi) D-shaped intermediate oval
- Raceway Venray in the Netherlands, 0.805 kilometres (0.500 mi) short track, new circuit
- Tipperary Raceway in Ireland, 0.402 kilometres (0.250 mi)

=== Former ===
- Autódromo de Sitges-Terramar in Spain, 2.000 kilometres (1.243 mi) high banked intermediate oval
- AVUS in Germany, 8.300 kilometres (5.157 mi) high banked superspeedway
- Brooklands in the United Kingdom, 4.453 kilometres (2.767 mi) kidney-bean-shaped high banked superspeedway
- Emerson Fittipaldi Speedway in Brasil, 3.000 kilometres (1.864 mi) trapezoid intermediate oval
- Monza Circuit in Italy, 4.250 kilometres (2.641 mi) high banked superspeedway (oval still extant but inactive)
- Opel-Rennbahn in Germany, 1.500 kilometres (0.932 mi) high banked short oval
- Raceway Venray in the Netherlands, 0.880 kilometres (0.547 mi) short track, old circuit
- Rockingham Motor Speedway in the United Kingdom, 2.380 kilometres (1.479 mi) trapezoid intermediate oval
- Tours Speedway in France, 0.575 kilometres (0.357 mi) temporary short track
- Twin Ring Motegi in Japan, 2.491 kilometres (1.548 mi) egg-shaped intermediate oval

== See also ==
- Dragstrip
- List of paved ovals in Canada
- List of paved ovals in Mexico
- List of paved ovals in the US
