= Opel-Rennbahn =

Race track

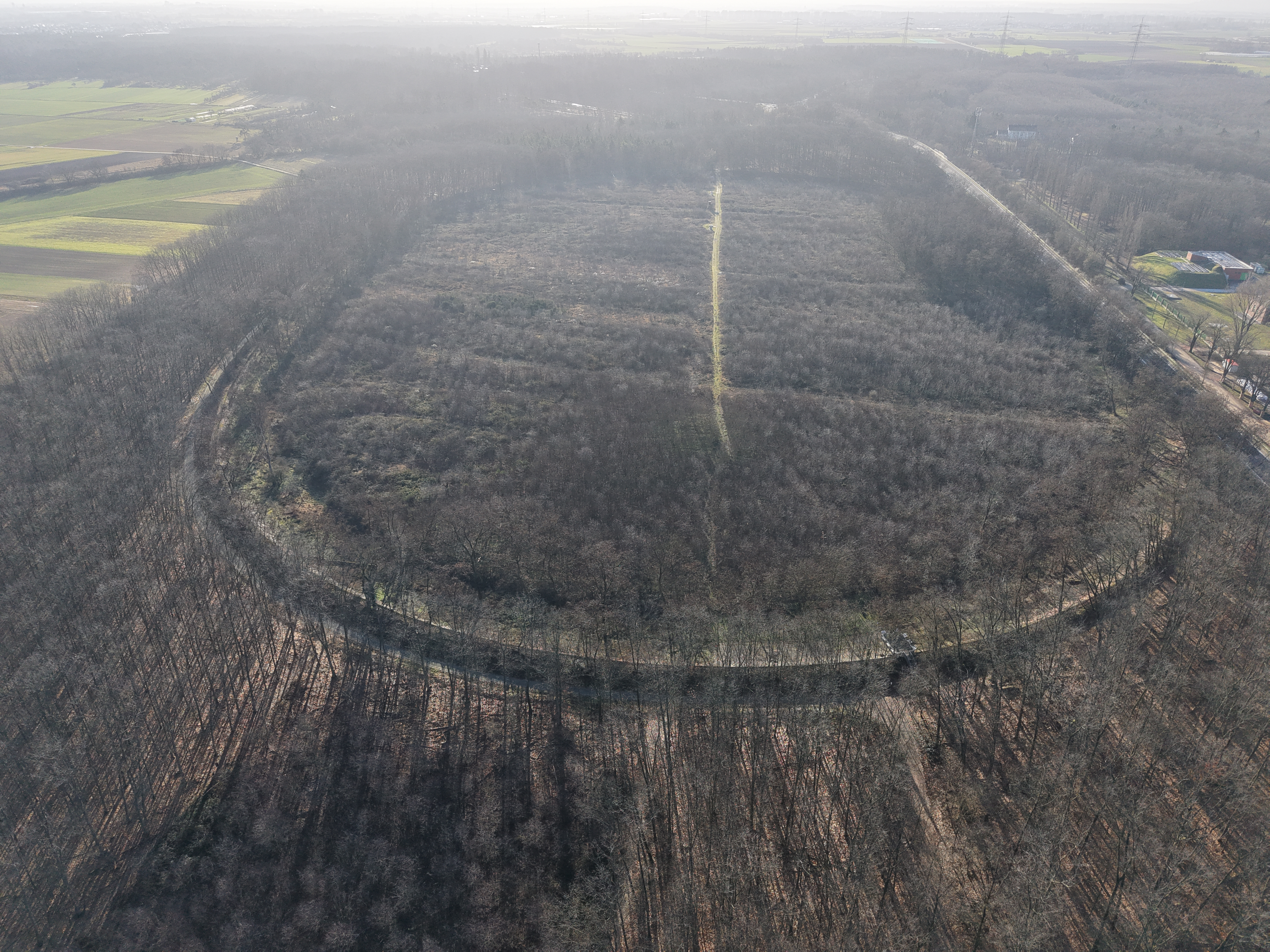
- Location: Rüsselsheim am Main, Hessen, Germany
- Coordinates: 49°57′54″N 8°24′59″E
- Capacity: 50,000
- Opened: 1919
- Closed: 1946

Oval
- Length: 1.5 km (0.93 mi)
- Turns: 2

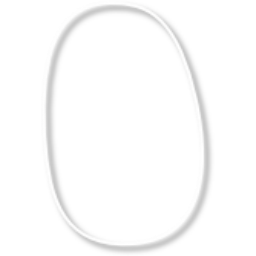

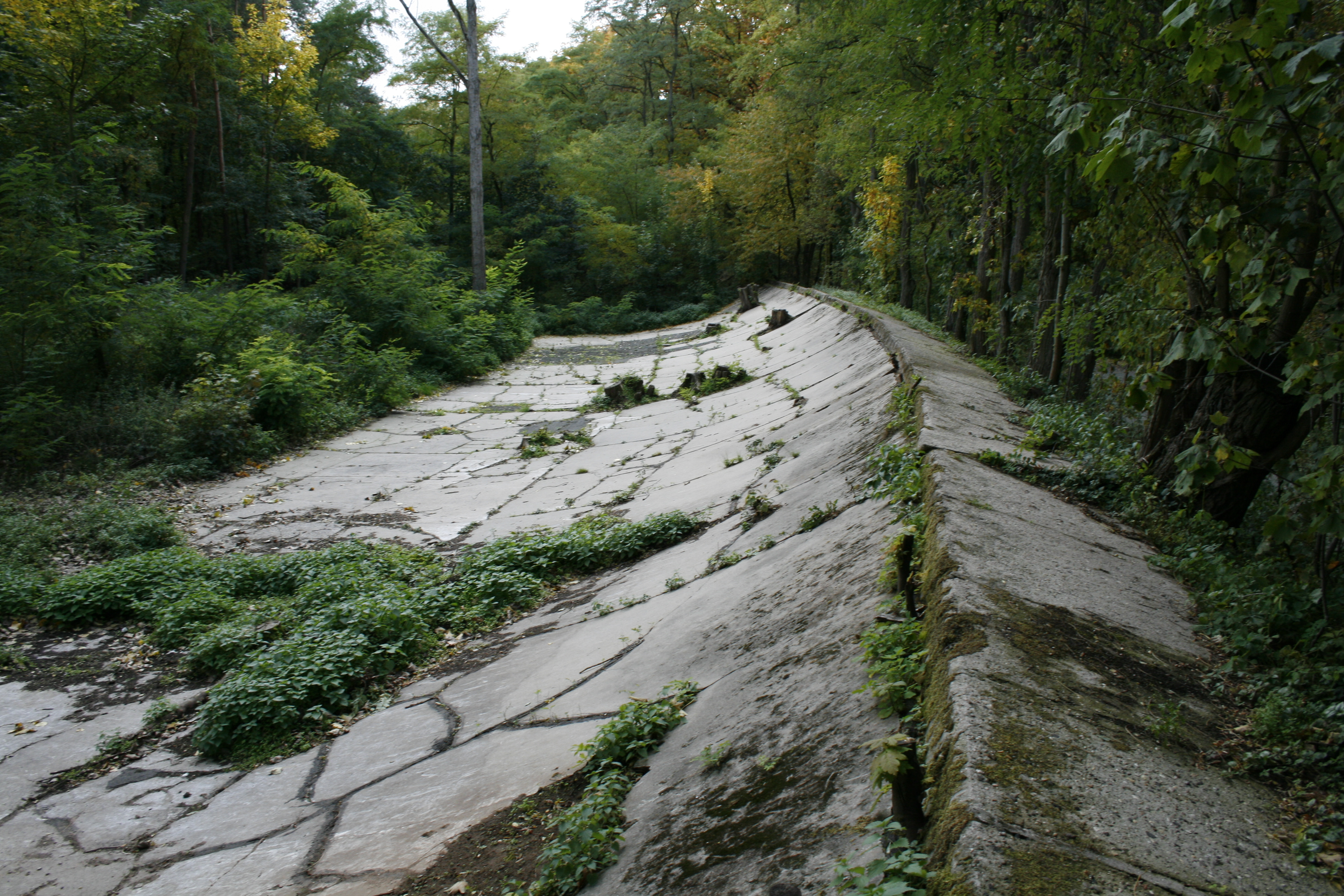
Part of the Nordkurve 2008

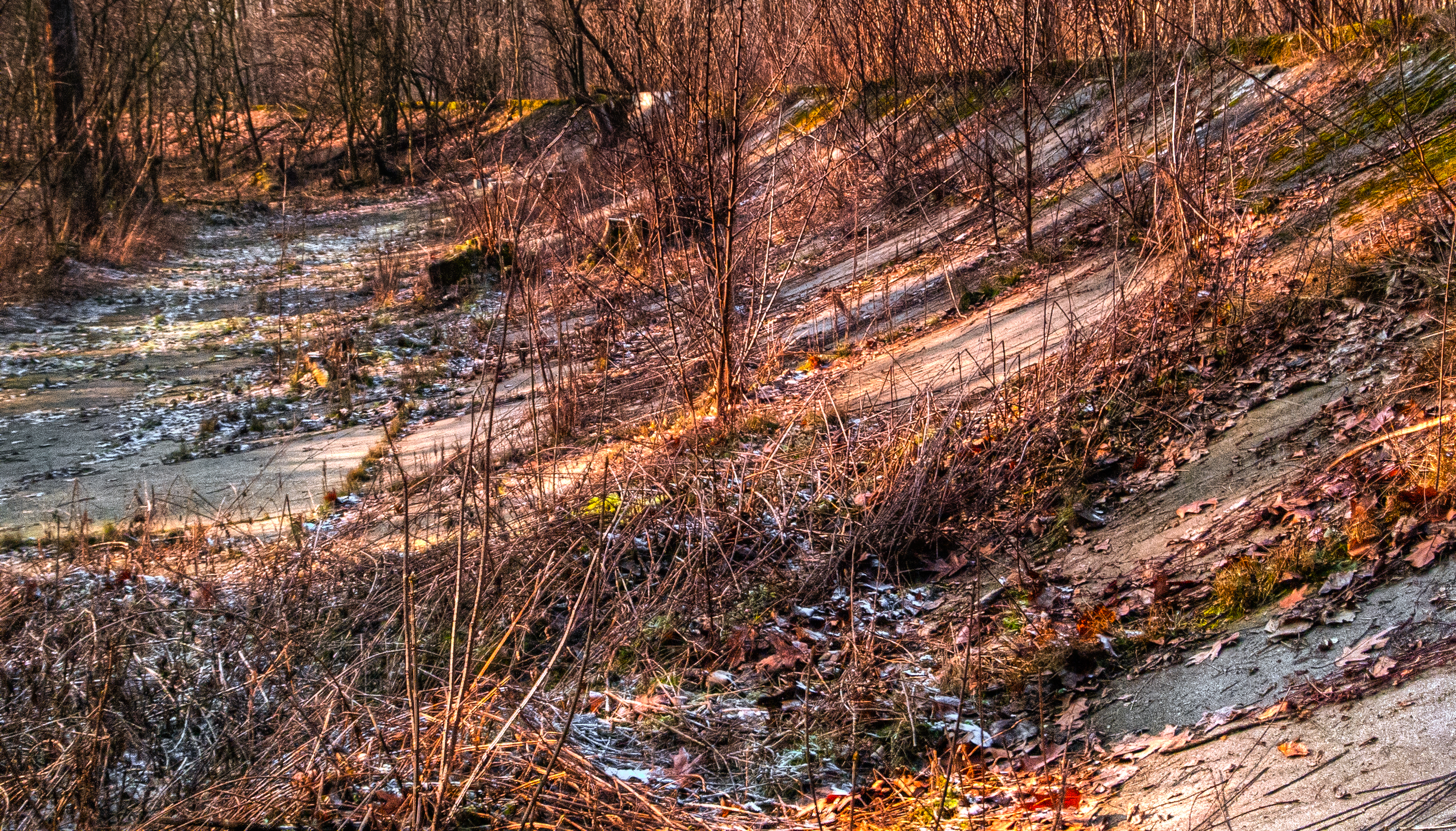
Remnants of the track in January 2011

Part of the Nordkurve 2025

The Opel-Rennbahn 'Opel Racetrack' is a former race track built by the Adam Opel AG in 1919. It was located in a forest about two kilometers south of Rüsselsheim am Main at the Schönauer Hof and was Germany's first purpose build racing track. The site is owned by the City of Mainz, which now operates a waterworks there.

== Use from 1919 to 1946 ==
Due to its design as an oval track racing circuit with a track width of twelve meters and its high, steep curves, it was considered one of the fastest racetracks in Europe in the 1920s. Average speeds of up to 140 km / h were possible. The Opel racetrack was used for public bicycle, motorcycle and car racing, and attracted up to 50,000 visitors at peak times. Among others, Jimmie Simpson, Guido Mentasti and Hermann Lang started their careers here. It was also the test track of Adam Opel AG, which often tested new developments here, including the rocket car Opel RAK.1. Due to the technical development in Motorsport as well as the opening of the AVUS, Nürburgring and the Hockenheimring, however, fewer and fewer racing events were held on the racetrack from 1930 onwards. After the end of World War II the site was temporarily used by the US Army.

== State since 1946 ==
Since 1946, the use of the Opel racetrack has been completely abandoned, but the facility was not demolished. In 1949 the lease with the city of Mainz expired. As a result, holes were made in the slope in order to plant trees there. In the 1960s, part of the home straight was demolished in order to facilitate the new construction of the L3012 state road. The slope is partly overgrown today, but it is still easy to see; in particular the steep wall curves are almost completely preserved. More recently, the historic complex has been integrated into the Rhein-Main Regional Park as an industrial heritage site. A small, accessible platform with information boards has been protruding into the north curve since 2013.
