= Pio Chapel =

Roman Catholic church in Pampanga, Philippines

- San Vicente Ferrer Chapel
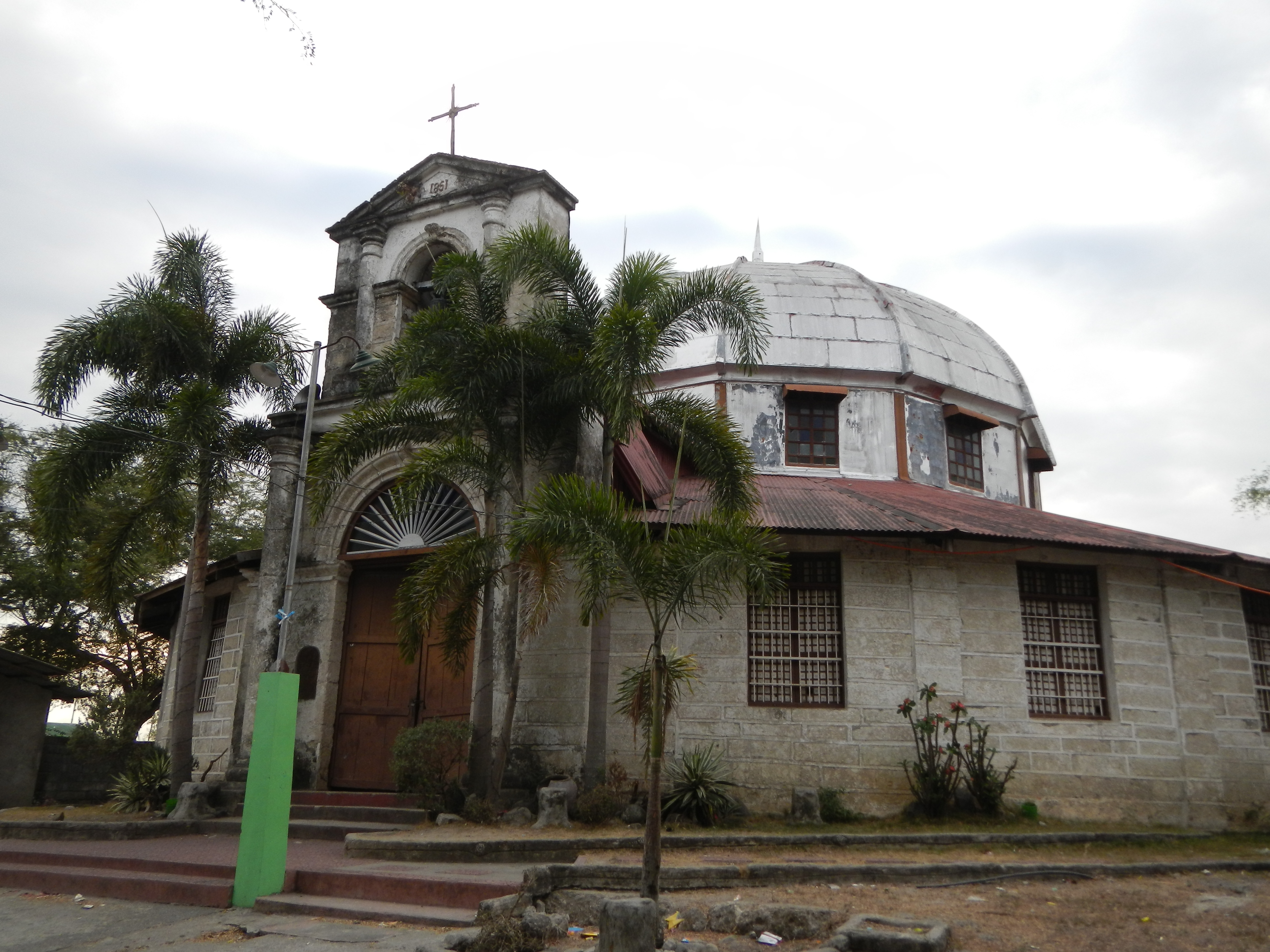
- Chapel facade in 2015

- Location in Luzon Location in the Philippines
- 15°02′53″N 120°31′02″E
- Location: Pampanga
- Country: Philippines
- Denomination: Roman Catholic

History
- Status: Chapel
- Founded: 1861
- Founder: Don Felino Gil
- Dedication: Saint Vincent Ferrer

Architecture
- Functional status: Active
- Architectural type: Church building

Specifications
- Materials: Brick, sand, stone, gravel, cement, galvanized iron, concrete, wood

Administration
- Province: Pampanga
- Archdiocese: San Fernando

Clergy
- Archbishop: Florentino Lavarias
- Priest: Rev. Fr. Winifredo S. Santos

San Vicente Ferrer Chapel, commonly known as Pio Chapel, is a Roman Catholic chapel located at Barangay Pio, in Porac, Pampanga. It is under the jurisdiction of the Archdiocese of San Fernando. Built in 1861, the chapel is believed to be the first circular chapel of its kind in the Philippines. In 2019, a magnitude 6.3 earthquake caused the two pilasters on the chapel's facade to collapse.

== History ==
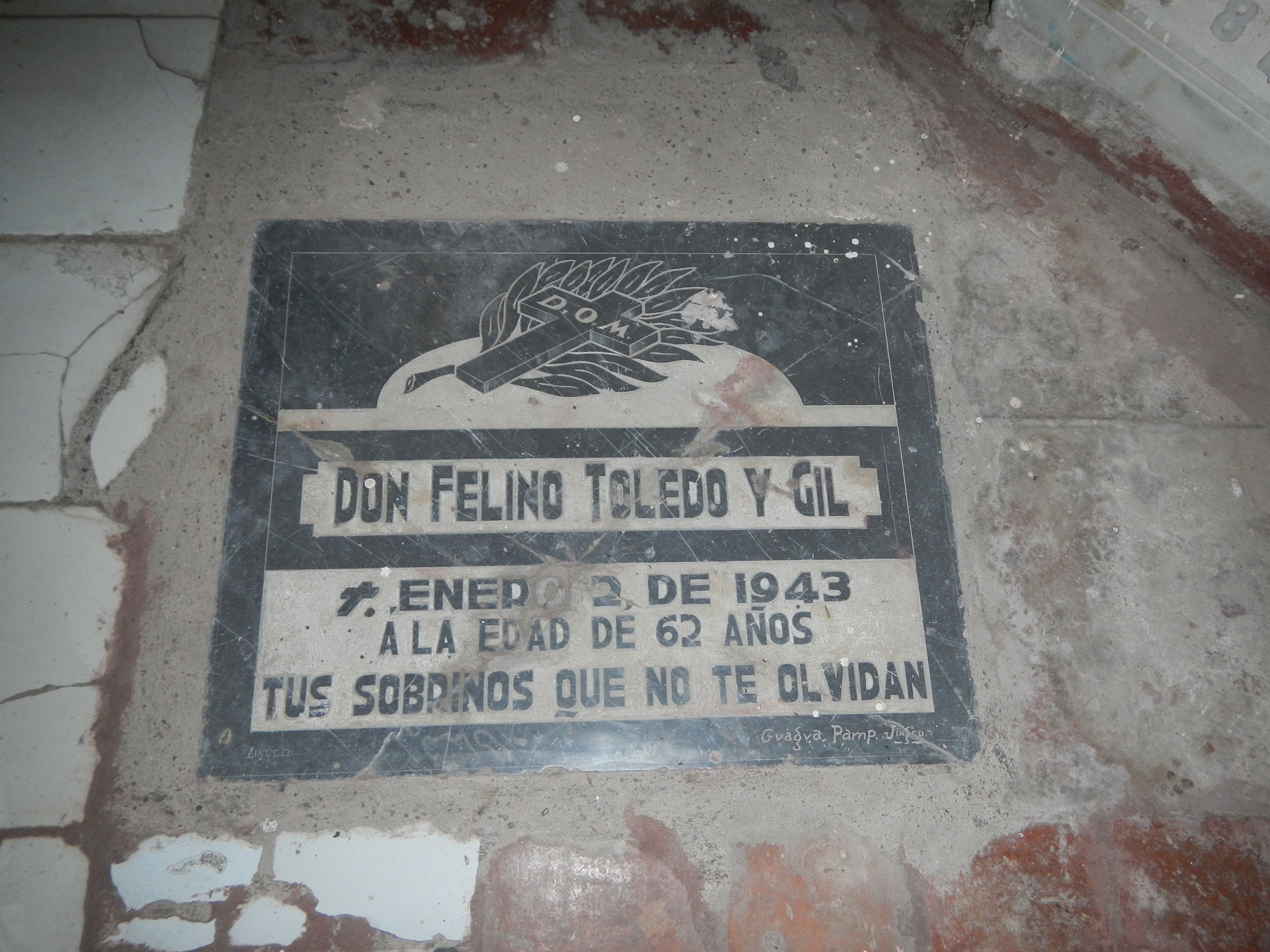
Don Felino Gil gravestone

The 19th-century Pio chapel is located at Barangay Pio, south of the Porac town proper. Originally a privately owned hacienda chapel, it is now used as a community chapel and masses are consistently held inside the chapel every Saturday at 5:00 PM. It was erected in 1861 by Don Felino Gil, founder of the Escuela de Artes y Oficios (now Don Honorio Ventura Technological State University), recognized as the oldest trade school in Asia. Don Felino, a prominent Spanish military man responsible for paving the way for the coming of Spanish missionaries in the area, acquired vast tracts of land as a reward for his service. He later converted his land into lucrative sugarcane plantations. Don Felino, along with his other relatives and descendants, are interred inside the said chapel, among hand-painted tiles. The chapel is a rare gem for Philippine church architecture since it is recognized as one of the oldest and best-reserved chapels in the country despite the fact that in Pampanga alone, several Spanish-era chapels still stand to this day. Moreover, the circular form of the chapel is a rarity during the era of its construction, together with the oval-shaped Saint Pancratius chapel of Paco Park. Both structures predate another prominent circular chapel, the Parish of the Holy Sacrifice in University of the Philippines, Diliman, by almost a hundred years.

== Architecture ==
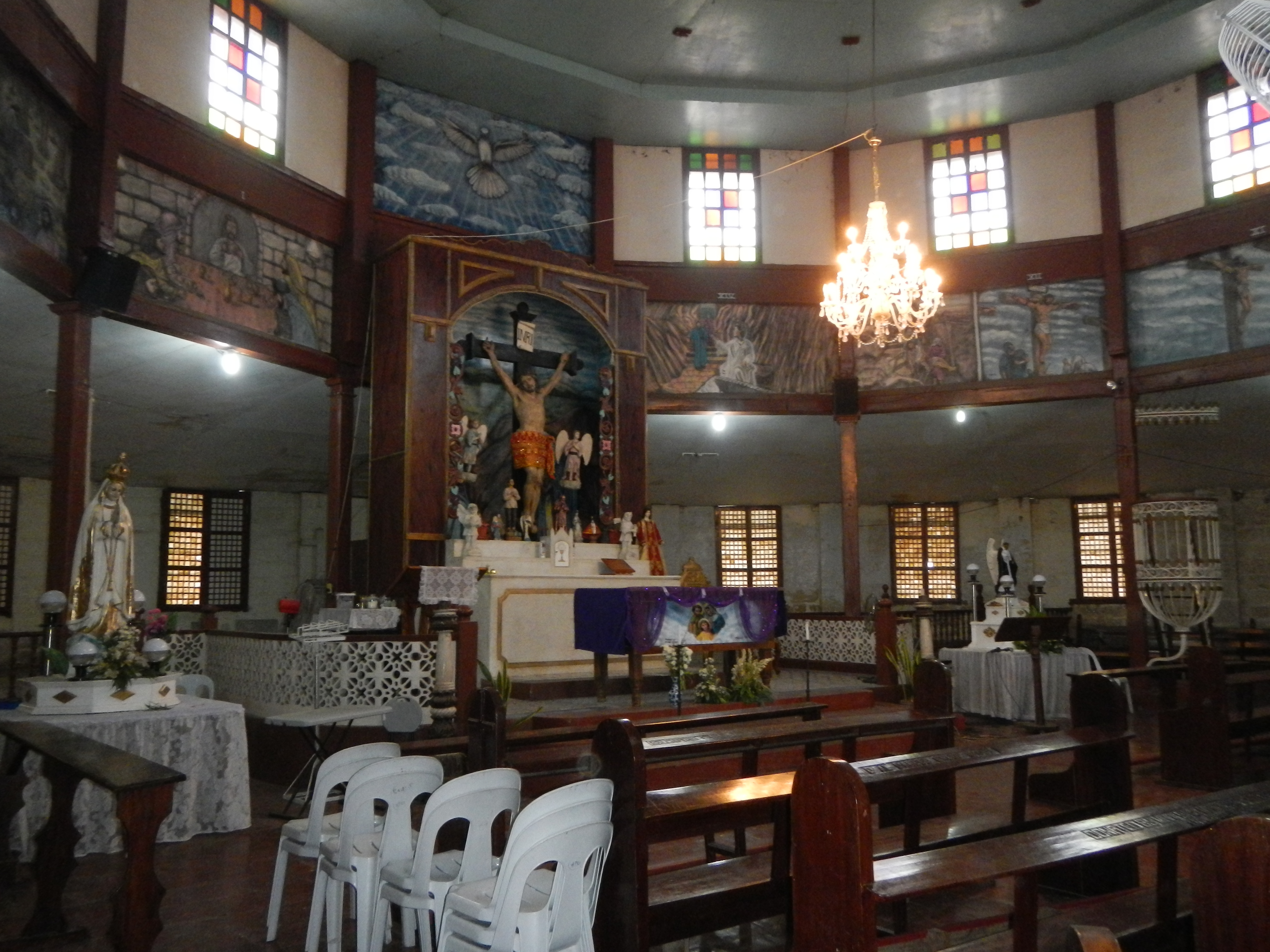
Chapel interior in 2015

The chapel features a two-level façade, with Tuscan columns flanking a semicircular arch main portal on the first level and a semicircular arch window on the second level. The façade is topped by a triangular pediment bearing the inscription 1861, the year the chapel was completed. The roofing of the first level moves toward the center of the structure, where a smaller polygonal dome caps the entire chapel.

== Controversy on the chapel’s preservation ==
During the early years of the 21st century, news spread out that the chapel has been sold to Architect Gerry Acuzar, president of the New San Jose Builders, Inc. and known for his collection of antique houses which he dismantles and transfer to his estate at Bagac, Bataan (now the Las Casas Filipinas de Acuzar, an open-air museum and hotel-resort). Sources tell that the chapel was supposed to be transferred to the 50-hectare property of Architect Acuzar to complete the old town setting of the property that he is developing. The news alarmed heritage conservation advocates, stating the heritage structures lose their value when they are removed from the context from which such buildings are originally built on. As of writing, the chapel still remains on its original setting.

== 2019 Luzon earthquake ==
On April 22, 2019, a 6.1 magnitude earthquake struck the island of Luzon in the Philippines, leaving at least 18 dead, three missing and injuring at least 256 others. Despite the epicenter was in Zambales, most of the damage to infrastructure occurred in the neighboring province of Pampanga, which suffered damage to 29 buildings and structures, including chapels and churches.

During the 2019 Luzon earthquake, the posts supporting the chapel's facade have crumbled. Debris from other parts of the chapel were also found scattered around its perimeter.

=== Restoration ===
After the earthquake, villagers in Barangay Pio started the chapel's repair work. Steel trusses, aluminum roof, metal stairs to the belfry, and iron bar to hold the bell were installed. For the repair, the villagers raised a total of 2 million pesos from raffle draws, solicitation and donation.

Since the chapel is a private property, the villagers did not receive restoration guidance from the Archdiocese of San Fernando. However, according to a cultural advocate, the chapel's repair work had been found to be inconsistent with heritage conservation protocols.

== Gallery ==
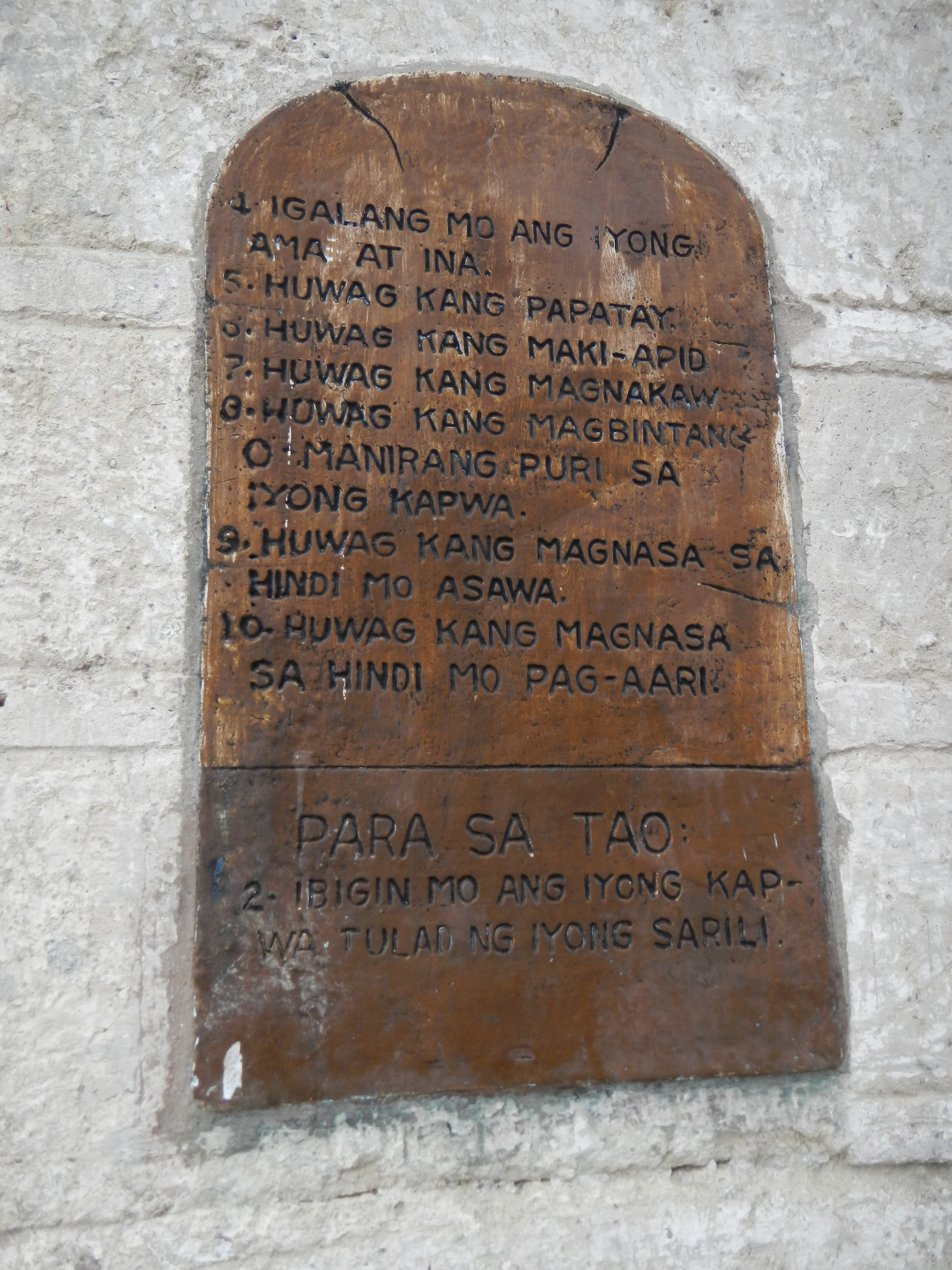
Ten Commandments

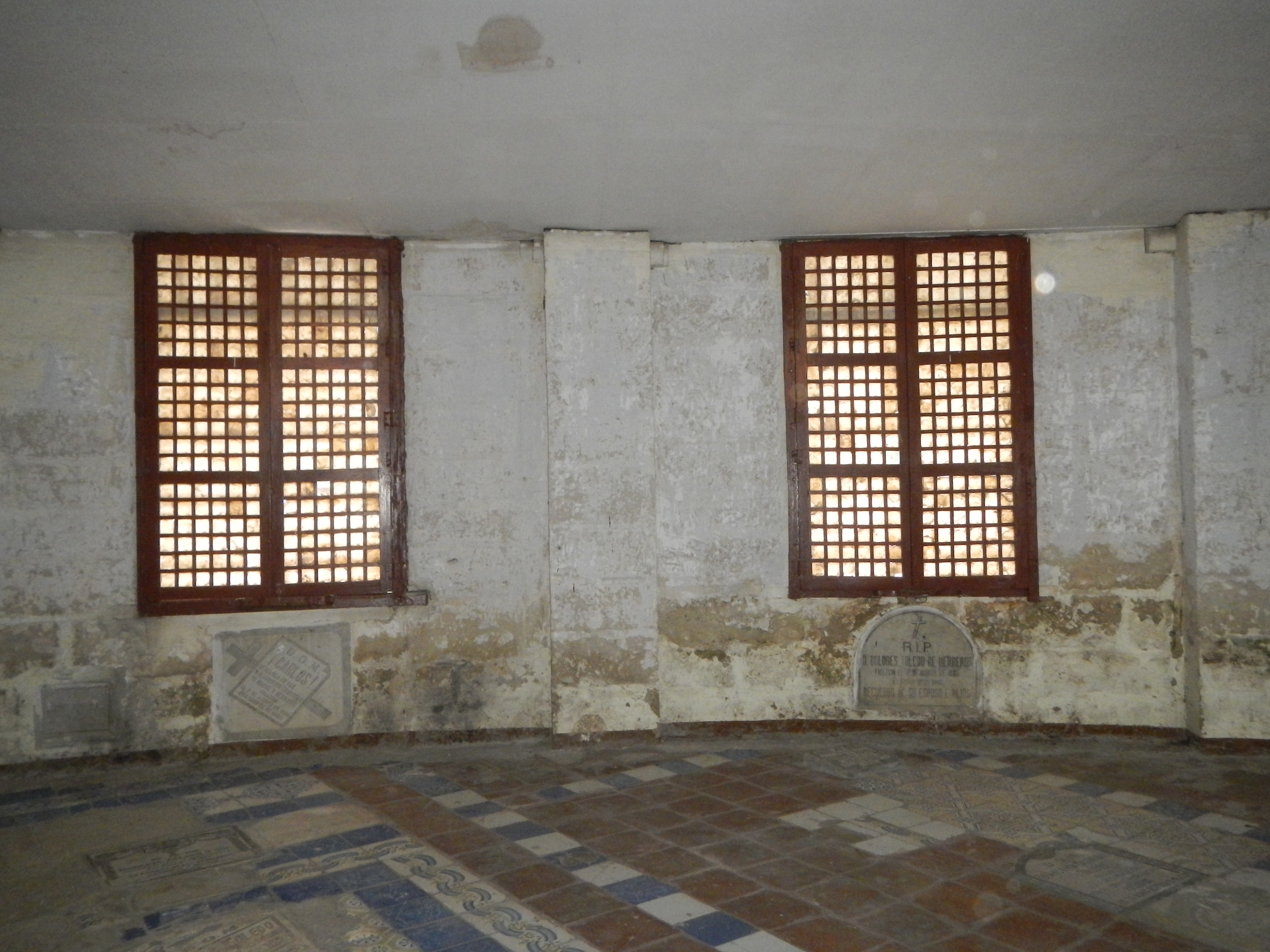
Gravestones beneath capiz shell windows

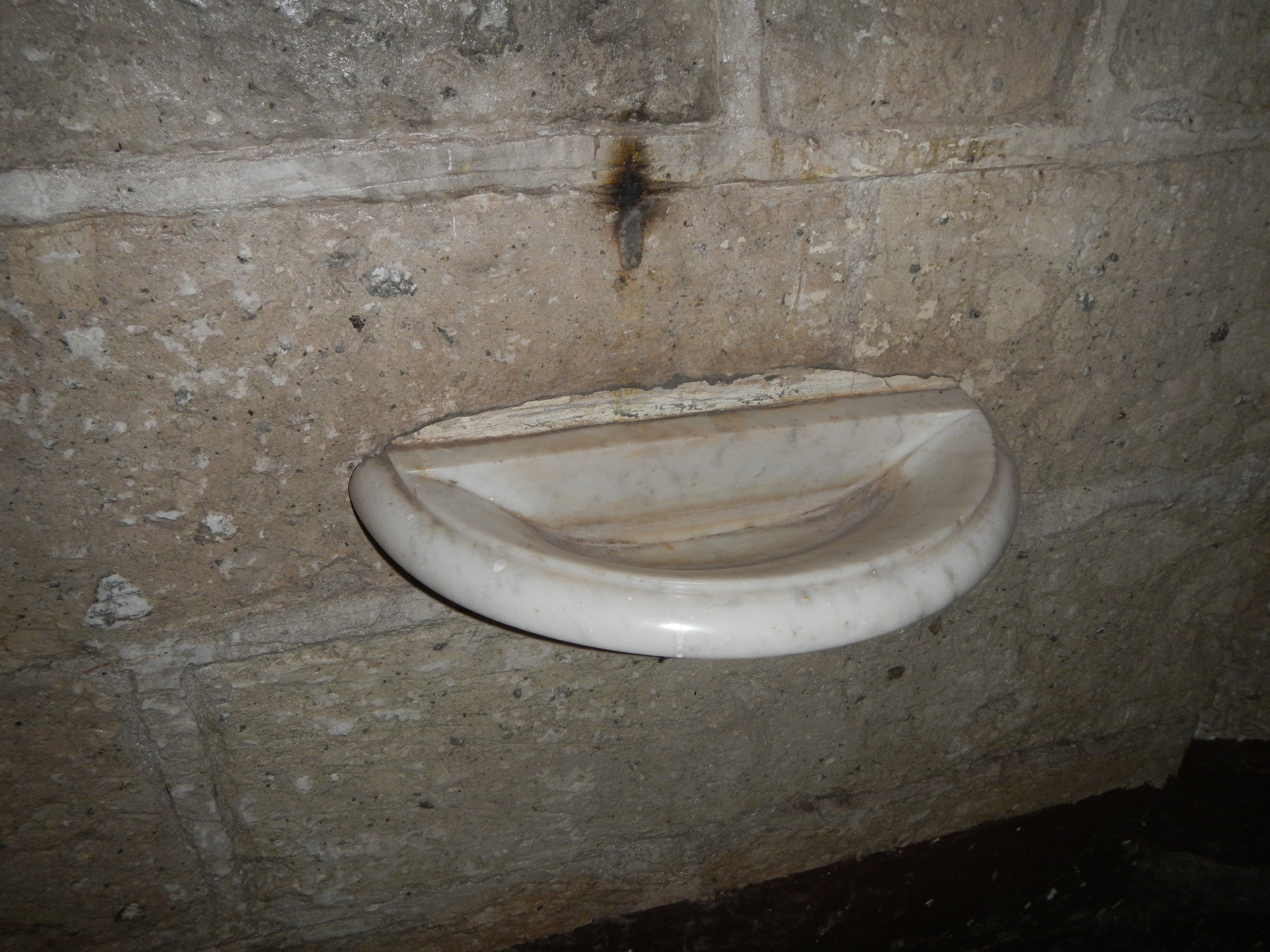
Holy water font

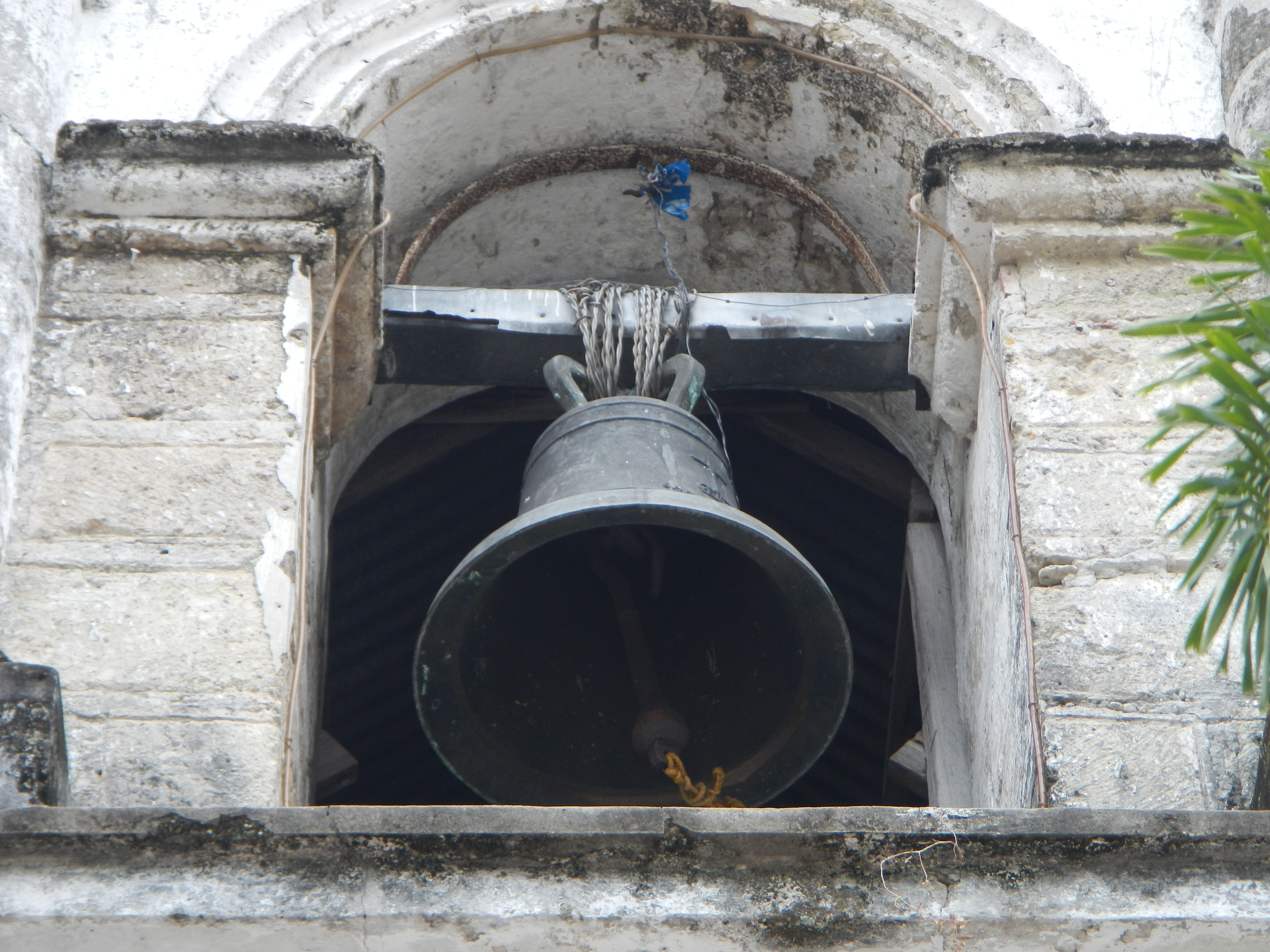
Belfry

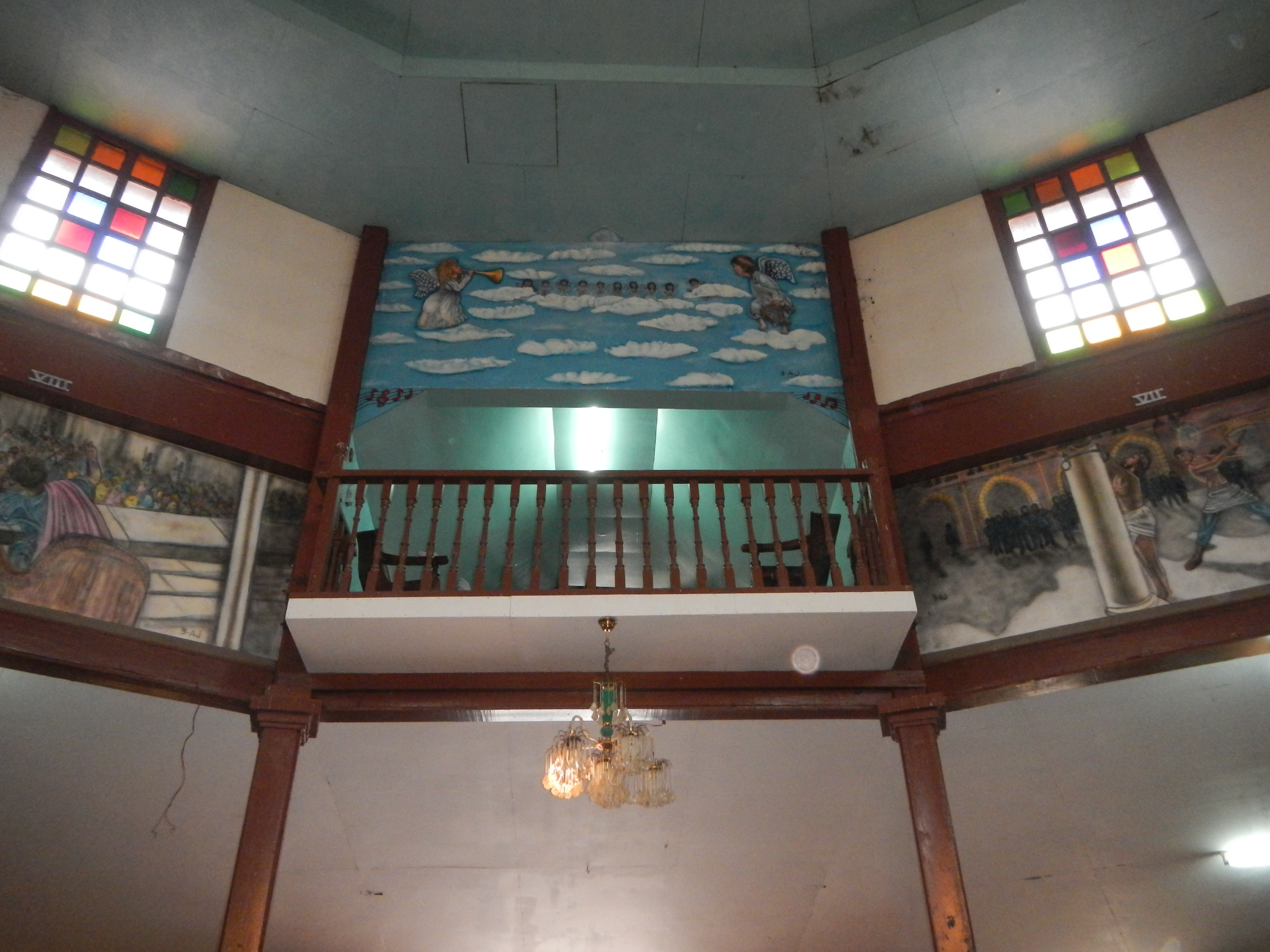
Choir loft and clerestories

== See also ==
- Santa Catalina de Alejandria Church (Porac)
