= Pampanga International Circuit =

Philippine motorsport venue

Pampanga International Circuit City Kart Racing Pampanga
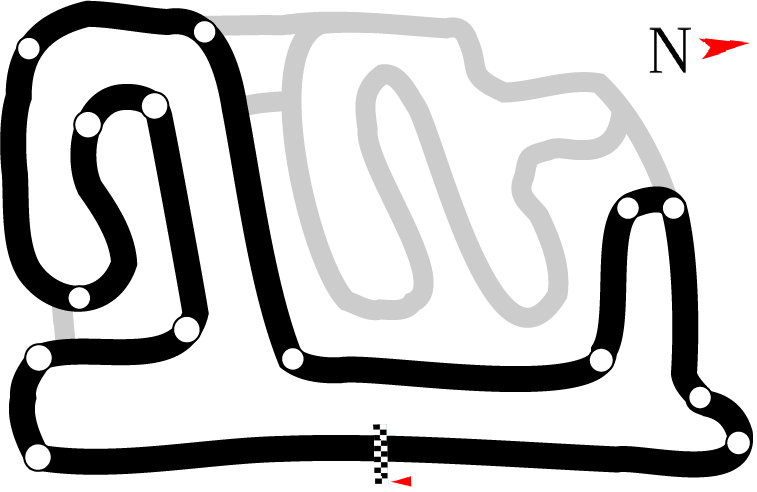
- Location: Brgy. Alviera, Porac, Pampanga, Philippines
- Coordinates: 15.113327°N 120.510705°E
- FIA Grade: CIK-FIA homologated
- Operator: City Kart Racing
- Opened: 30 November 2019; 6 years ago
- Major events: Rotax Max Asia Challenge; Philippine Qualifiers (2019–present); Sodi World Series (2019–present)
- Website: https://citykartracing.com/

Outer track
- Length: 1.39 km (0.86 mi)
- Race lap record: 1:04.200

The Pampanga International Circuit, is a motor racing and kart racing venue located in Alviera, Porac, Pampanga, Philippines. It is operated by the City Kart Racing Group and hosts the Sodi World Series and the Rotax Max Asia Challenge in the Philippines. Opened to the general public in 2019, the circuit features short and long course layouts.

== History ==
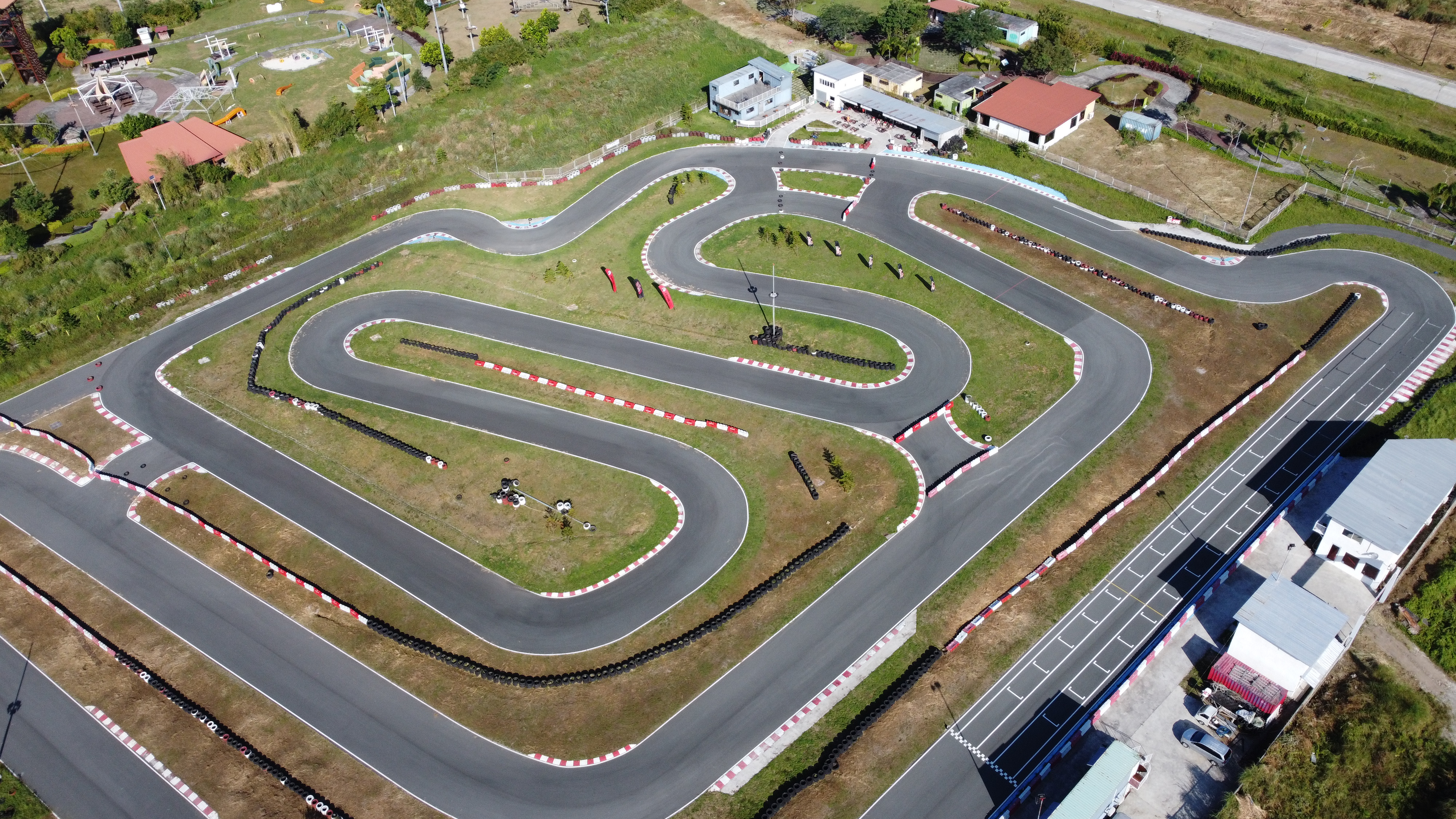
Birds-eye view of the circuit as it appeared in January 2021

The circuit, located inside the SandBox Adventure Park in Porac, Pampanga, opened to the public on November 30, 2019 after two years of design and construction. To mark the grand opening of the Pampanga International Circuit, it hosted back-to-back events over a 3-day race weekend from November 29 to December 1. The 12 Hour Sodi World Series (SWS) Endurance Race then followed, where 13 teams competed round-the-clock from dusk ’til dawn. It obtained CIK-FIA homologation shortly after.

Its main investor and operator is the City Kart Racing Group who also operates and runs City Kart Racing at Circuit Makati.

== See also ==
- Clark International Speedway
- Porac, Pampanga
