= Porac =

Municipality in Pampanga, Philippines

- Municipality
- Municipality of Porac
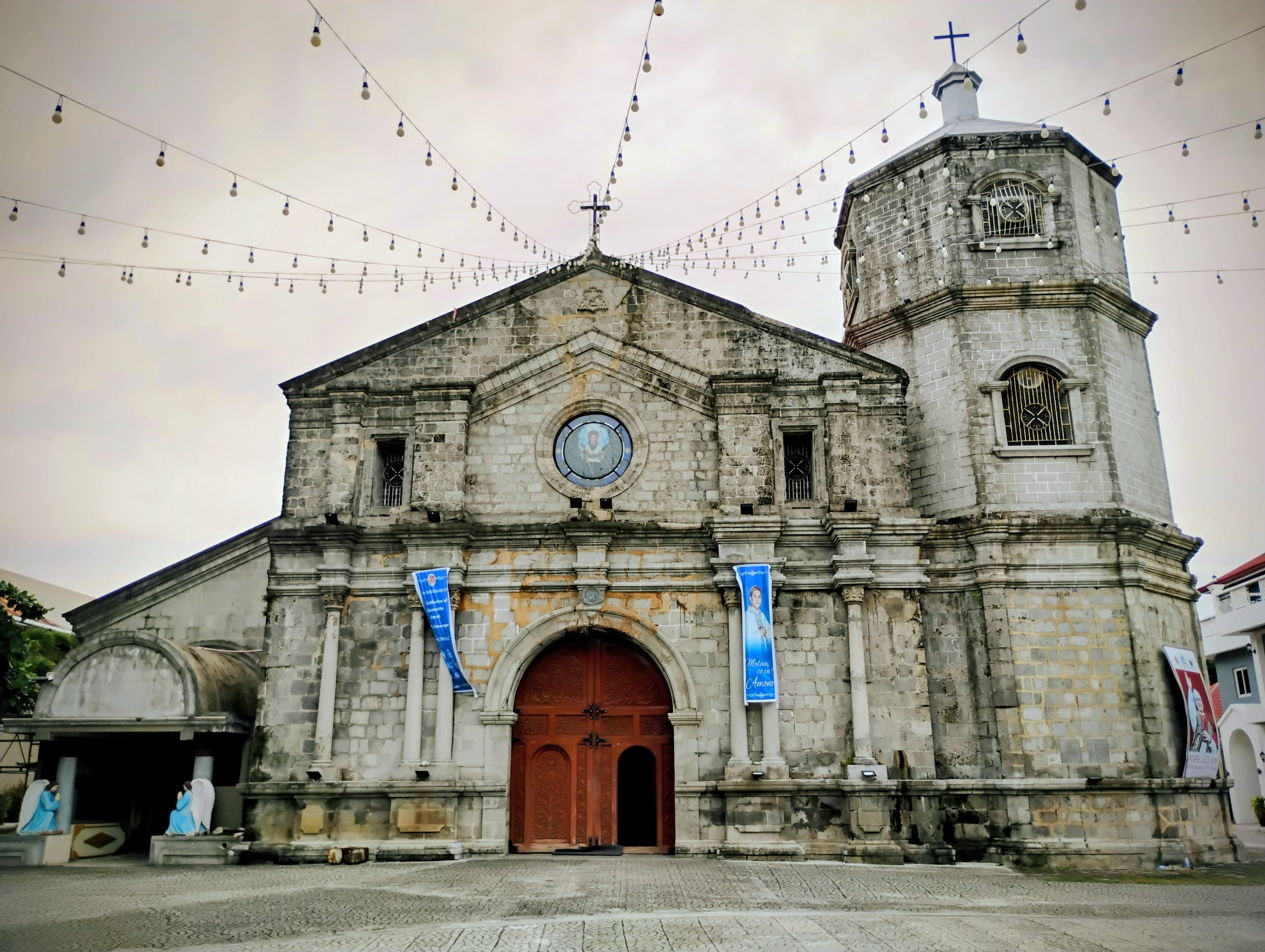
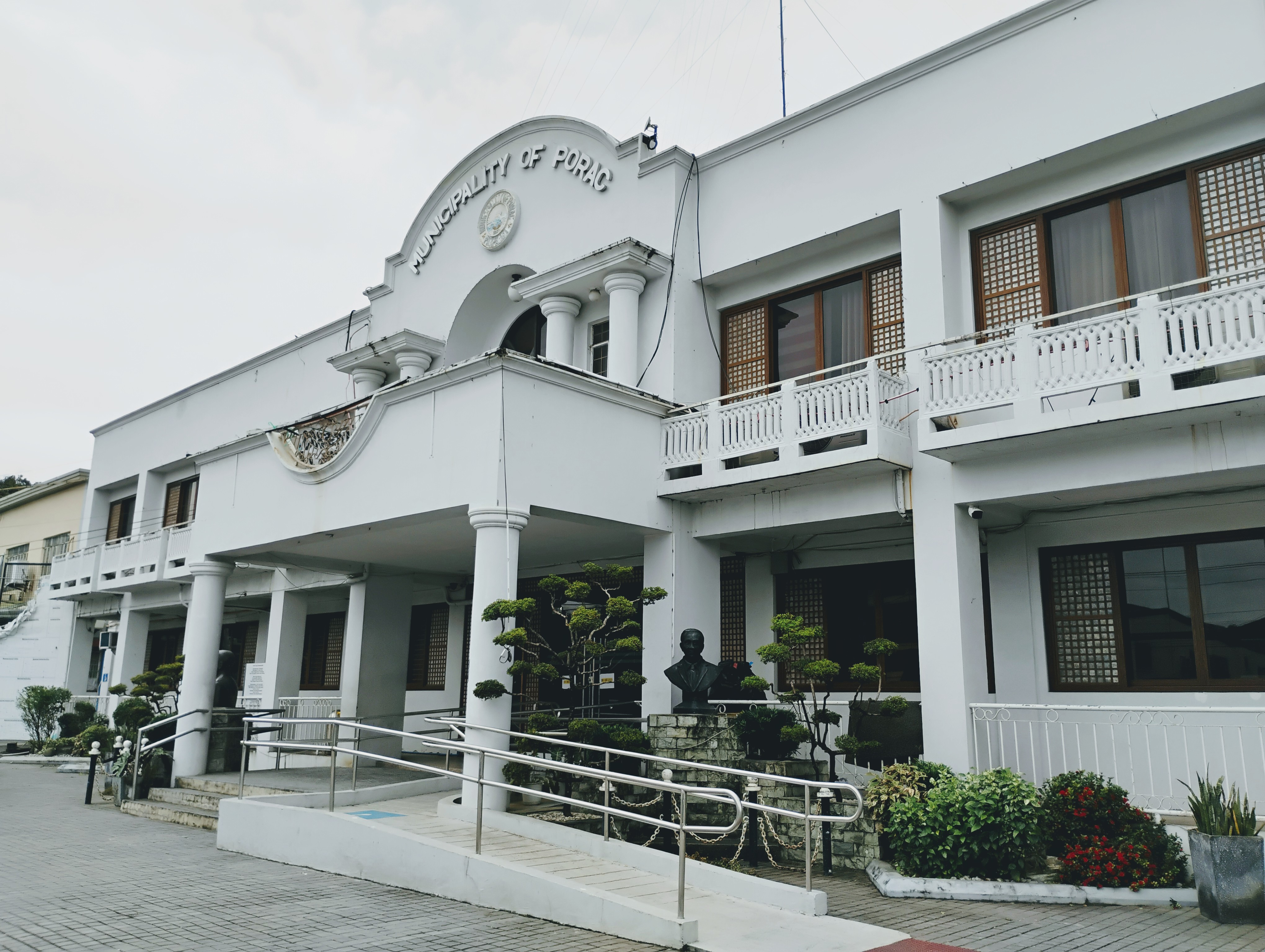
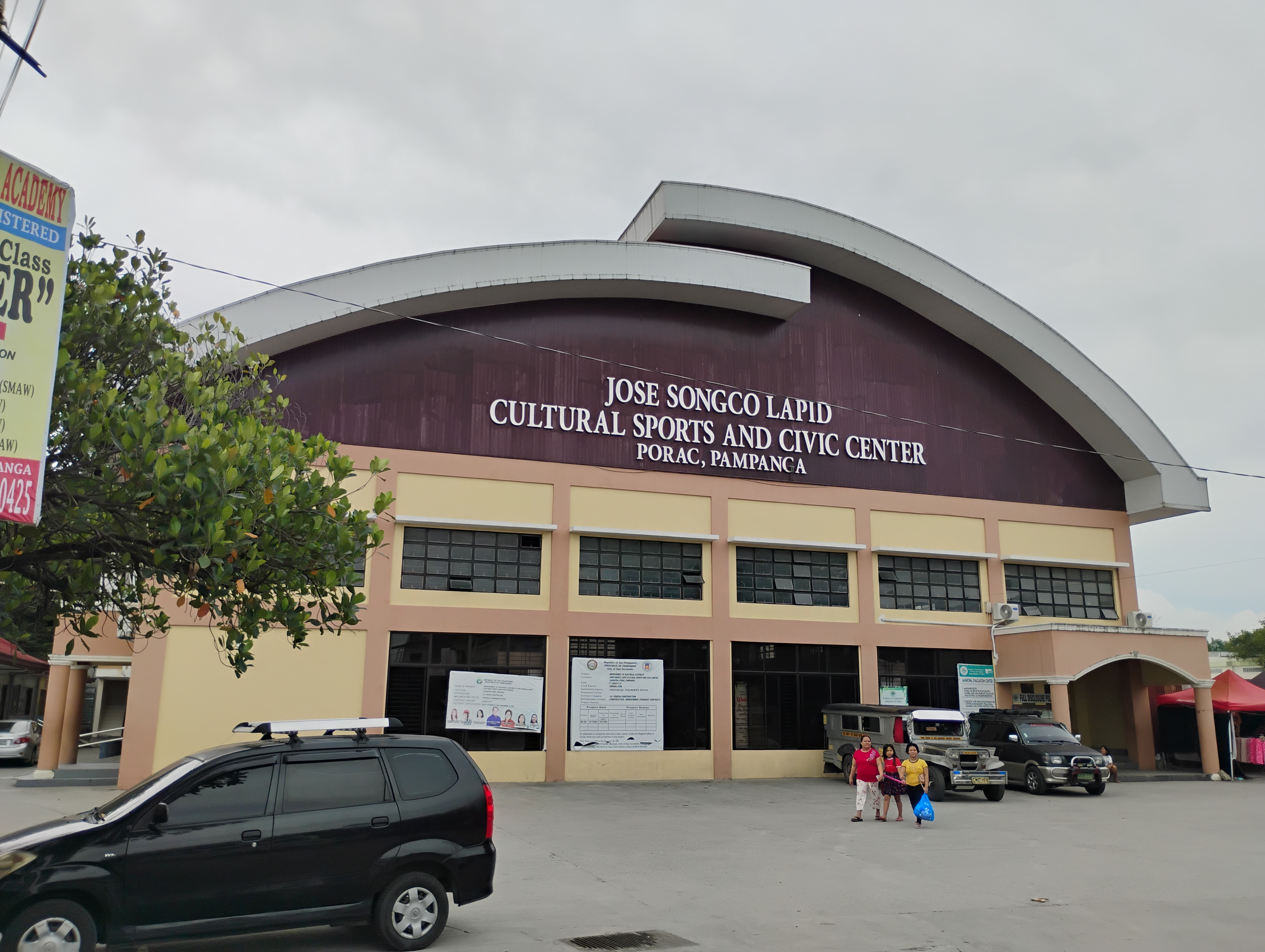
- Santa Catalina de Alexandria Parish Church Porac Municipal Hall Jose Songco Lapid Cultural Sports & Civic Center

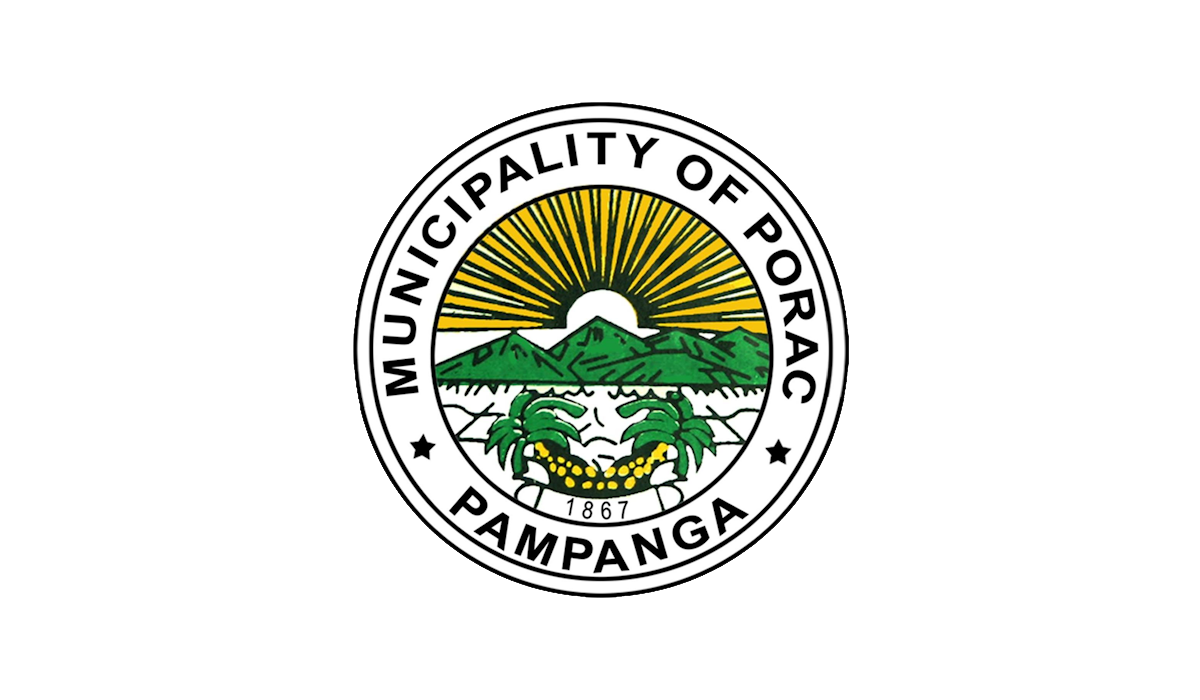
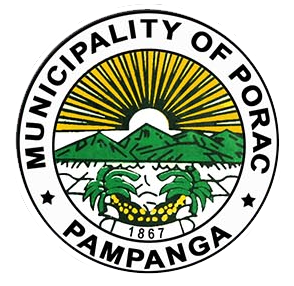
- Flag Seal

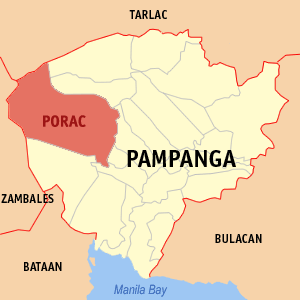
- Map of Pampanga with Porac highlighted
- Interactive map of Porac
- Location within the Philippines
- Coordinates: 15°04′19″N 120°32′31″E
- Country: Philippines
- Region: Central Luzon
- Province: Pampanga
- District: 2nd district
- Founded: October 31, 1594
- Barangays: 29 (see Barangays)

Government
  - Type: Sangguniang Bayan
  - Mayor: Jaime V. Capil (Independent)
  - Vice Mayor: Trisha Angelie G. Capil (Independent)
  - Representative: Gloria Macapagal Arroyo (Lakas)
  - Councilors: List: Michelle C. Bengco (Note: Suspended until April 7, 2025); Rohner L. Buan; Adrian R. Carreon; Hilario d.C Dimalanta; John Nuevy L. Venzon; Essel Joy C. David; Rafael M. Canlapan
  - Electorate: 80,603 voters (2025)

Area
  - Total: 314.00 km^{2} (121.24 sq mi)
- Elevation: 98 m (322 ft)
- Highest elevation: 1,583 m (5,194 ft)
- Lowest elevation: 36 m (118 ft)

Population (2024 census)
  - Total: 147,551
  - Density: 469.91/km^{2} (1,217.1/sq mi)
  - Households: 33,367

Economy
  - Income class: 1st municipal income class
  - Poverty incidence: 7.77% (2023)
  - Revenue: ₱ 822.6 million (2024)
  - Assets: ₱ 1,126 million (2024)
  - Expenditure: ₱ 681.4 million (2024)
  - Liabilities: ₱ 185.4 million (2024)

Service provider
  - Electricity: Pampanga 2 Electric Cooperative (PELCO 2)
- Time zone: UTC+8 (PST)
- ZIP code: 2008, 2023 (portions under Clark Freeport and Special Economic Zone)
- PSGC: 0305415000
- IDD : area code: +63 (0)45
- Native languages: Kapampangan; Tagalog
- Website: www.poracpampanga.gov.ph

Porac, officially the Municipality of Porac (Kapampangan: Balen ning Porac; Filipino: Bayan ng Porac), is a municipality in the province of Pampanga, Philippines. According to the 2024 census, it has a population of 147,551 people.

== History ==
Porac was founded on October 31, 1594, upon the acceptance of Fray Mateo Peralta in the Friar's Intermediate Chapter (recorded by Fray Gaspar de San Agustin, by saying Porac has its First Minister and Friar, Fray Mateo de Mendoza.

The General Headquarters and Military Camp Base of the Philippine Commonwealth Army and Philippine Constabulary was stationed in Porac from 1942 to 1946. It was the installation from which the local military operated against the Imperial Japanese military and local collaborators from 1942 to 1945. The Mexican Expeditionary Air Force was given a base around Porac to help liberate the country from the Empire of Japan in World War II.

== Geography ==
With an area of 34,310 hectares (84,800 acres), Porac is the largest town in Pampanga. It was once among the largest municipalities in the archipelago before it was divided into separate municipalities. Porac is 91 kilometres (57 mi) from Manila, 25 kilometres (16 mi) from the provincial capital San Fernando, and 8 kilometres (5.0 mi) from Angeles City. It is south of Angeles City and north of Floridablanca. A portion of Mount Pinatubo is in the municipality.

Porac has a hilly to mountainous terrain in the majority of its plains. Most rivers, if not all, are heavily silted by mudflow due to the eruption of Mount Pinatubo and succeeding lahar flows. Tourist spots include Darabulbul Falls (nicknamed Dara Falls) in Jalung, Miyamit Falls in Sapang Uwak, and the hot springs of Sitio Puning, accessed through Sapang Bato in Angeles. Babo Pangulo offers a view of Porac and Mount Negron.

The Subic–Clark–Tarlac Expressway (SCTEx) traverses this town, the exit of which is located in Barangay Manuali.

=== Barangays ===
Porac is politically subdivided into 29 barangays, as shown below. Each barangay consists of puroks and some have sitios.

- Babo Pangulo
- Babo Sacan (Guanson)
- Balubad
- Calzadang Bayu
- Camias
- Cangatba
- Diaz
- Dolores (Hacienda Dolores)
- Inararo (Aetas)
- Jalung
- Mancatian
- Manibaug Libutad
- Manibaug Paralaya
- Manibaug Pasig
- Manuali
- Mitla Proper
- Palat
- Pias
- Pio
- Planas
- Poblacion
- Pulung Santol
- Salu
- San Jose Mitla
- Santa Cruz
- Sapang Uwak (Aetas)
- Sepung Bulaun (Baidbid)
- Siñura (Seniora)
- Villa Maria (Aetas)

=== Climate ===
Climate data for Porac, Pampanga
| Month | Jan | Feb | Mar | Apr | May | Jun | Jul | Aug | Sep | Oct | Nov | Dec | Year |
|---|---|---|---|---|---|---|---|---|---|---|---|---|---|
| Mean daily maximum °C (°F) | 30 (86) | 31 (88) | 33 (91) | 34 (93) | 33 (91) | 31 (88) | 29 (84) | 29 (84) | 29 (84) | 30 (86) | 31 (88) | 30 (86) | 31 (87) |
| Mean daily minimum °C (°F) | 19 (66) | 20 (68) | 21 (70) | 23 (73) | 25 (77) | 25 (77) | 25 (77) | 25 (77) | 24 (75) | 23 (73) | 22 (72) | 20 (68) | 23 (73) |
| Average precipitation mm (inches) | 8 (0.3) | 9 (0.4) | 15 (0.6) | 34 (1.3) | 138 (5.4) | 203 (8.0) | 242 (9.5) | 233 (9.2) | 201 (7.9) | 126 (5.0) | 50 (2.0) | 21 (0.8) | 1,280 (50.4) |
| Average rainy days | 3.7 | 4.1 | 6.5 | 11.2 | 21.2 | 24.9 | 27.7 | 26.5 | 25.5 | 21.8 | 12.6 | 5.6 | 191.3 |
Source: Meteoblue

Porac has two distinct climates, rainy and dry. The rainy or wet season normally begins in May and runs through October, while the rest of the year is the dry season. The warmest period of the year occurs between March and April, while the coolest period is from December through February.

== Demographics ==
Population census of Porac

| Year | Pop. | ±% p.a. |
|---|---|---|
| 1903 | 8,487 | — |
| 1918 | 10,243 | +1.26% |
| 1939 | 16,169 | +2.20% |
| 1948 | 14,685 | −1.06% |
| 1960 | 23,449 | +3.98% |
| 1970 | 36,232 | +4.44% |
| 1975 | 44,462 | +4.19% |
| 1980 | 50,906 | +2.74% |

| Year | Pop. | ±% p.a. |
|---|---|---|
| 1990 | 68,215 | +2.97% |
| 1995 | 75,408 | +1.90% |
| 2000 | 80,757 | +1.48% |
| 2007 | 102,962 | +3.41% |
| 2010 | 111,441 | +2.92% |
| 2015 | 124,381 | +2.11% |
| 2020 | 140,751 | +2.64% |
| 2024 | 147,551 | +1.14% |

Source: Philippine Statistics Authority

In the 2024 census, the population of Porac was 147,551 people, with a density of 470 inhabitants per square kilometre or 1,200 inhabitants per square mile.

== Economy ==
Poverty incidence of Porac (%)

Source: Philippine Statistics Authority

Porac is an important source of granite and a tamping ground of minerals.

Porac is home to the Mekeni Food Corporation, an "AAA" Meat Processing Plant accredited with the National Meat Inspection Service (NMIS). Being classified under the "AAA" category, it is qualified to market its products, not just in the local, but in the international market as well. This means that it is compliant to all government regulatory requirements to assure food quality and safety in its operations (Sun Star, 2006).

In 2014, Ayala Land and Leonio Land embarked on developing a mixed-used estate in Porac known as Alviera. The development project combines business, residential, recreational, leisure, and institutional. The local government dubbed Alviera as the regional growth center of Central Luzon. Now, it is a premiere tourist destination in the north, and the Philippines' hub for karting with the presence of the Pampanga International Circuit.

== Elected Officials ==
2025-2028 Porac, Pampanga Officials
| Position | Name | Party |
|---|---|---|
| Mayor | Jaime V. Capil | Independent |
| Vice Mayor | Trisha Angelie G. Capil | Independent |
| Councilors | Rafael M. Canlapan | Independent |
| Councilors | Maynard T. Lapid | NPC |
| Councilors | John Nuevy L. Venzon | Independent |
| Councilors | Jin Mikhaela M. Canlas-Sagun | Independent |
| Councilors | Dexter Albert A. David | Kambilan |
| Councilors | Francis Laurence C. Tamayo | Independent |
| Councilors | Adrian R. Carreon | Independent |
| Councilors | Princess L. Buan | Kambilan |
Ex Officio Municipal Council Members
| ABC President | Joel V. Capil | Nonpartisan |
| SK Federation President | Angelo B. David | Nonpartisan |

== Government ==
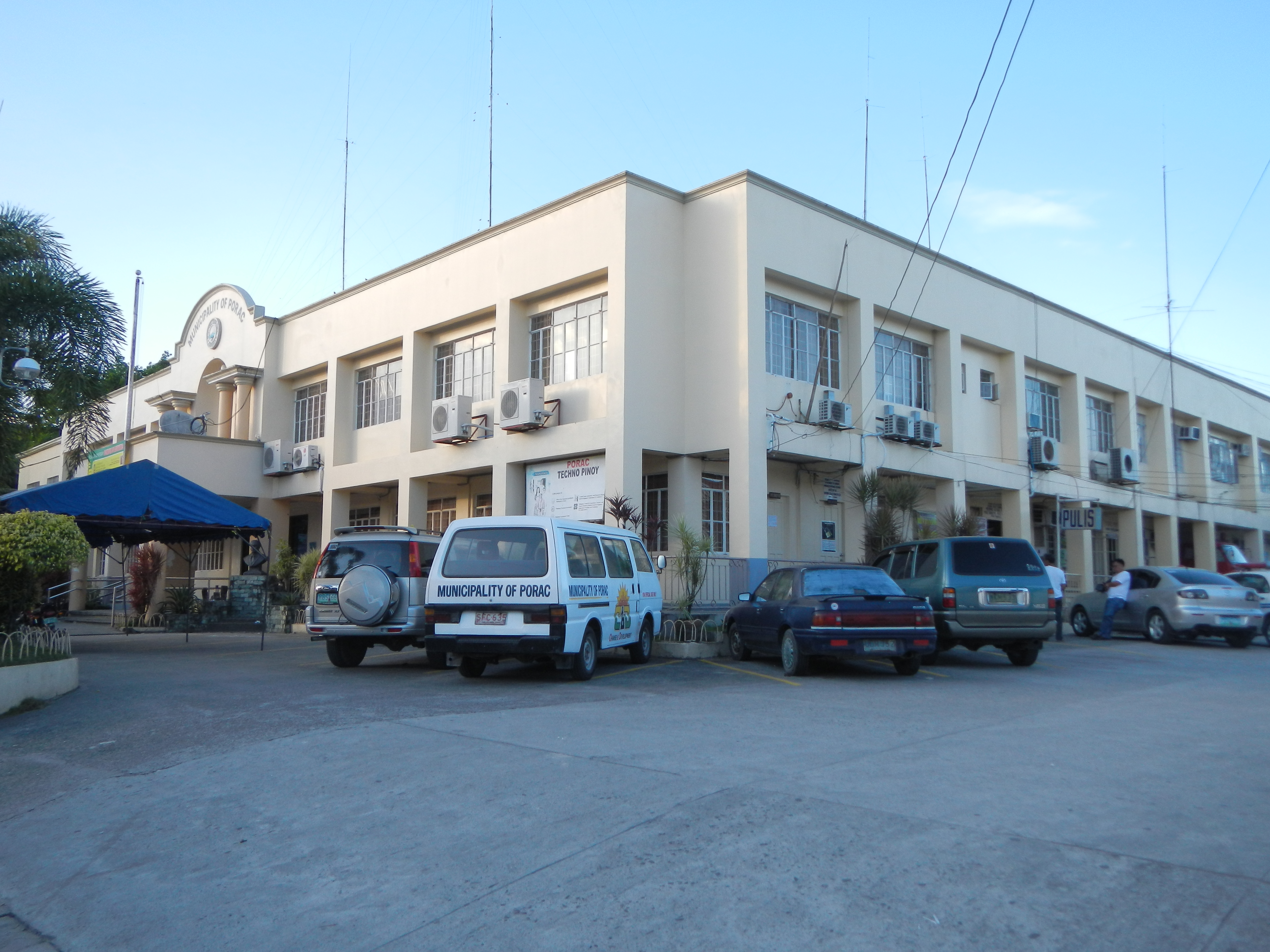
Town hall

The municipal government is divided into three branches: executive, legislative and judiciary. The judicial branch is administered solely by the Supreme Court of the Philippines. The executive branch is composed of the mayor and the barangay captains for the barangays. The legislative branch is composed of the Sangguniang Bayan (town assembly), Sangguniang Barangay (barangay council), and the Sangguniang Kabataan for the youth sector.

== Spanish-era Roman Catholic churches ==
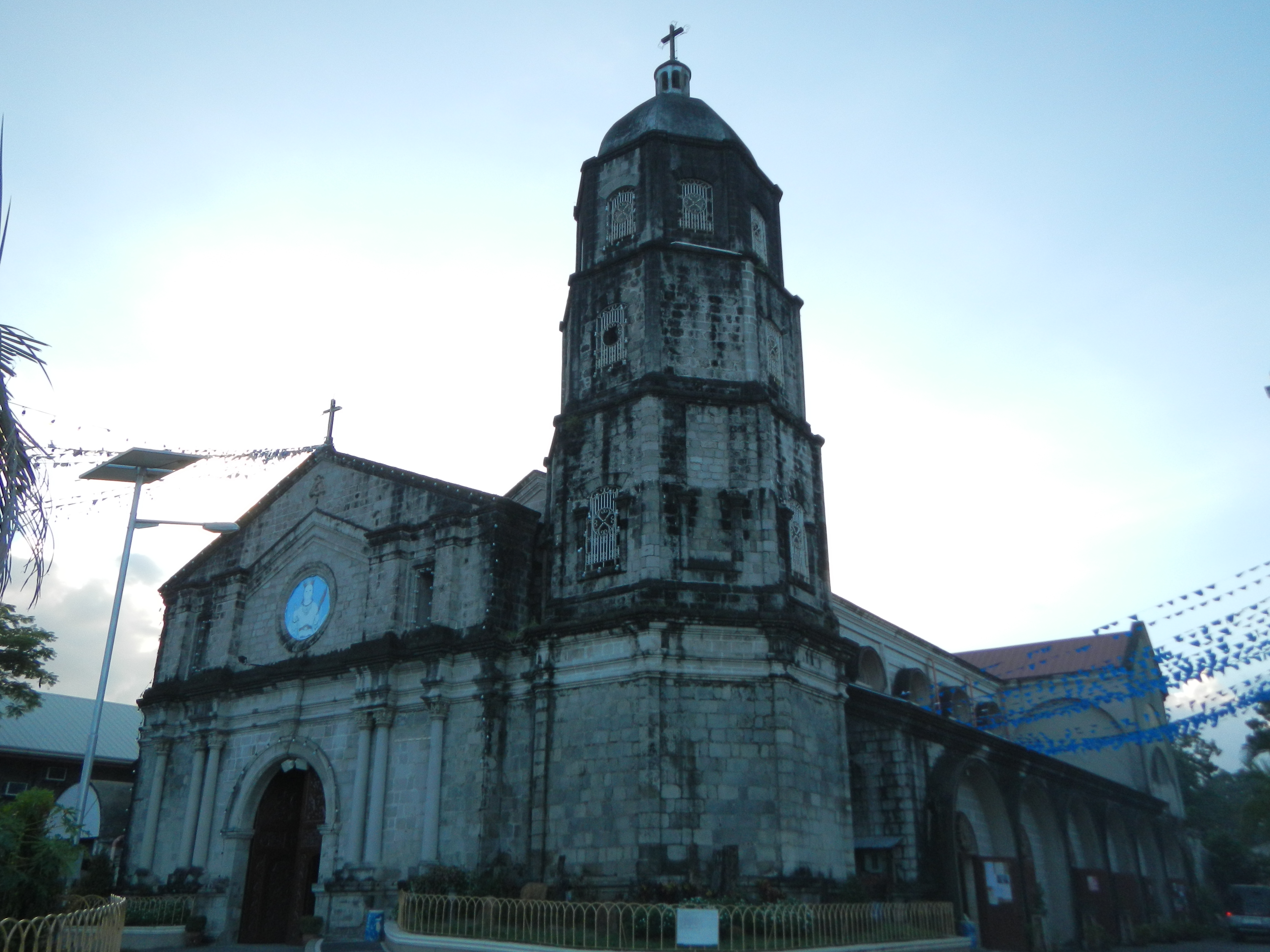
Façade of Santa Catalina de Alejandria Parish Church

Since the founding of the town of Porac in 1867, various Roman Catholic structures have been built in the area to aid in the religious practices of the devout Kapampangans. As of writing, three notable Spanish-era religious structures are extant within the municipality. The largest of the three, the Santa Catalina de Alejandria Church is located at Barangay Poblacion and still functions as one of Porac's main parochial structures. The other two are currently utilized as barangay chapels.

=== Santa Catalina de Alejandria Church ===
The Santa Catalina de Alejandria parish church is under the jurisdiction of the Roman Catholic Archdiocese of San Fernando. Its original structure, built in 1872, is largely intact but slight revisions have been made to the inside. It underwent restoration in the 1980s. The church is 52 metres (171 ft) long, 12 metres (39 ft) wide and 9 metres (30 ft) high.

In the earthquake of 2019, the church belfry was destroyed a day after Easter Sunday. Rebuilding operations are planned with call for donations to restore the church bell tower.

=== Pio Chapel ===
The 1861 Pio Chapel is a circular chapel built by Don Felino Gil, founder of the Escuela de Artes y Oficios (now the Don Honorio Ventura Technical State University).

=== Hacienda Dolores Chapel ===
Another vintage chapel is located at Barangay Dolores, north of the Porac town proper. The Our Lady of Sorrows Chapel was said to be built by the Dolores family within the old Hacienda Dolores in 1856. The chapel, like the Pio chapel, is currently utilized as a community chapel. The chapel boasts of a slender octagonal belfry and Doric columns adorning the two-level façade. Notable features of the chapel are finials found on both levels of the façade.

== Archaeology ==
The area in and around Babo Balukbuk in Porac has strong indications of human habitation, according to investigations published on the University of the Philippines Archaeological Studies Program website. Later test excavations confirmed this conclusion through the presence of materials dated around 12th century to 17th century C.E.

== Education ==
There are two Schools district offices which govern all educational institutions within the municipality. They oversee the management and operations of all private and public, from primary to secondary schools. These are Porac East Schools District Office, and Porac West Schools District Office.

=== Primary and elementary schools ===
- A.M.J. Precious Kids School
- Babo Pangulo Elementary School
- Babo Sacan Elementary School
- Balik Barangay (Manibaug Pasig) Elementary School
- Balubad Elementary School
- Calzadang Bayu Elementary School
- Camias Elementary School
- Daughters of St. Dominic School
- Diaz Elementary School
- Dolores Elementary School
- Dream Plus School Foundation
- Francisco Henson Elementary School
- Holy Trinity School
- Jalung Elementary School
- Jesus The Eternal Word Christian Academy
- Katutubo Village Elementary School
- Mancatian Elementary School
- Mancantian Elementary School (Balik Barangay)
- Manibaug Libutad Elementary School
- Manibaug Paralaya Elementary School
- Manibaug Pasig (Madapdap) Elementary School
- Mitla Elementary School
- Mitla Elementary School (Balik Barangay)
- Neverland Christian School
- Palat Elementary School
- Palat Gospel Ecumenical School
- Pias Elementary School
- Pio Elementary School
- Planas Elementary School
- Pulung Santol Elementary School
- Porac Elementary School
- Salu Elementary School
- Sapang Uwak Elementary School
- Sepung Bulaun Elementary School
- Siñura Elementary School
- Sta. Cruz Elementary School
- Villa Maria Elementary School

=== Secondary schools ===
- Camias High School
- Eastern Porac National High School
- Porac Model Community High School (Resettlement School)
- Planas High School
- Pulung Santol National High School
- Pulong Santol National High School (Annex 1)
- Sapang Uwak High School
- Villa Maria Integrated School

=== Higher educational institutions ===
- Miriam College Alviera
- Pampanga State University - Porac Campus
- Horeb Holines International College Foundation
- Saint Bernard School of Science and Technology

== Notable personalities ==
- Lito Lapid – Actor and Politician (Senator, 2019–present, 2004 – 2016 and Governor, 1995 – 2004)
- Mark Lapid – Governor of Pampanga from 2004 to 2007
- Juanita Nepomuceno – former congresswoman and governor from Pampanga
- Dick Israel – actor
- Vince Dizon – economist, consultant, and political aide
- Alfie Lorenzo – showbiz columnist, radio commentator, TV host and talent manager
- Jasmin Bungay – model and beauty pageant titleholder who was crowned Binibining Pilipinas Globe 2024
- Pedro Paulo Santos – 31st bishop and first Archbishop of Caceres.
- Monic Icban-Diamante, former member of Sexbomb Girls.

== Gallery ==
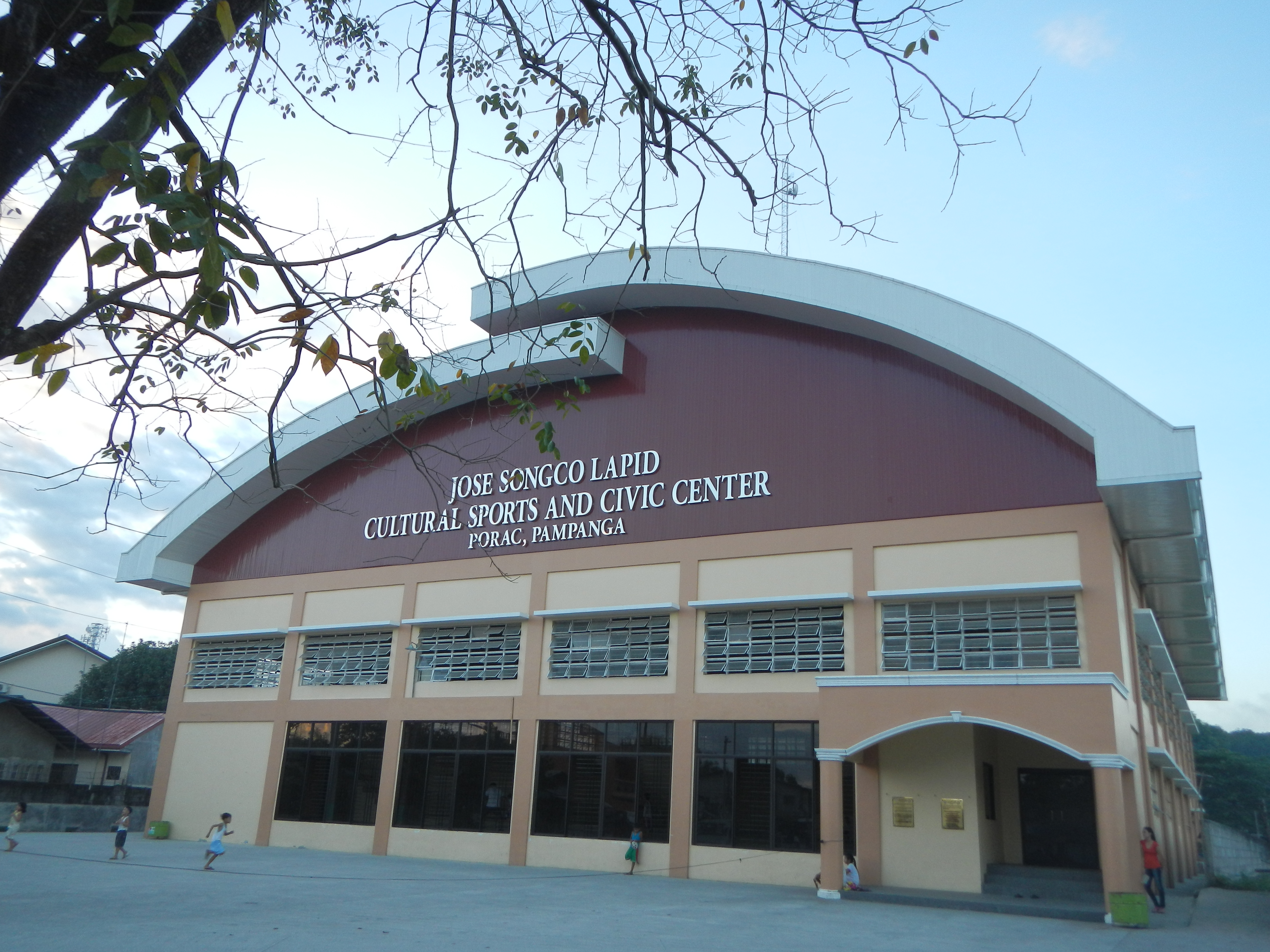
Jose Songco Lapid Sports and Civic Center Gymnasium

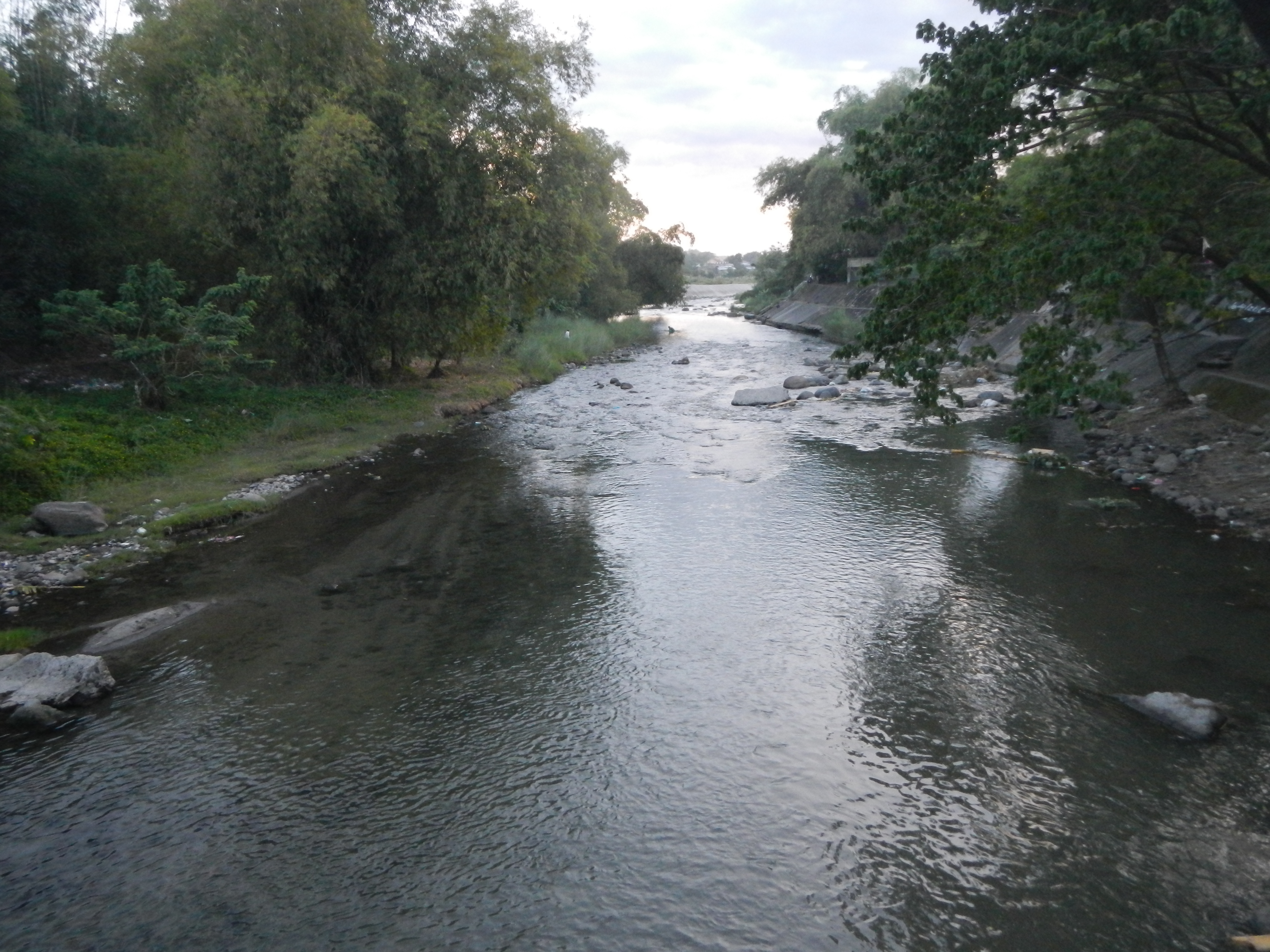
Rio Grande de Pampanga

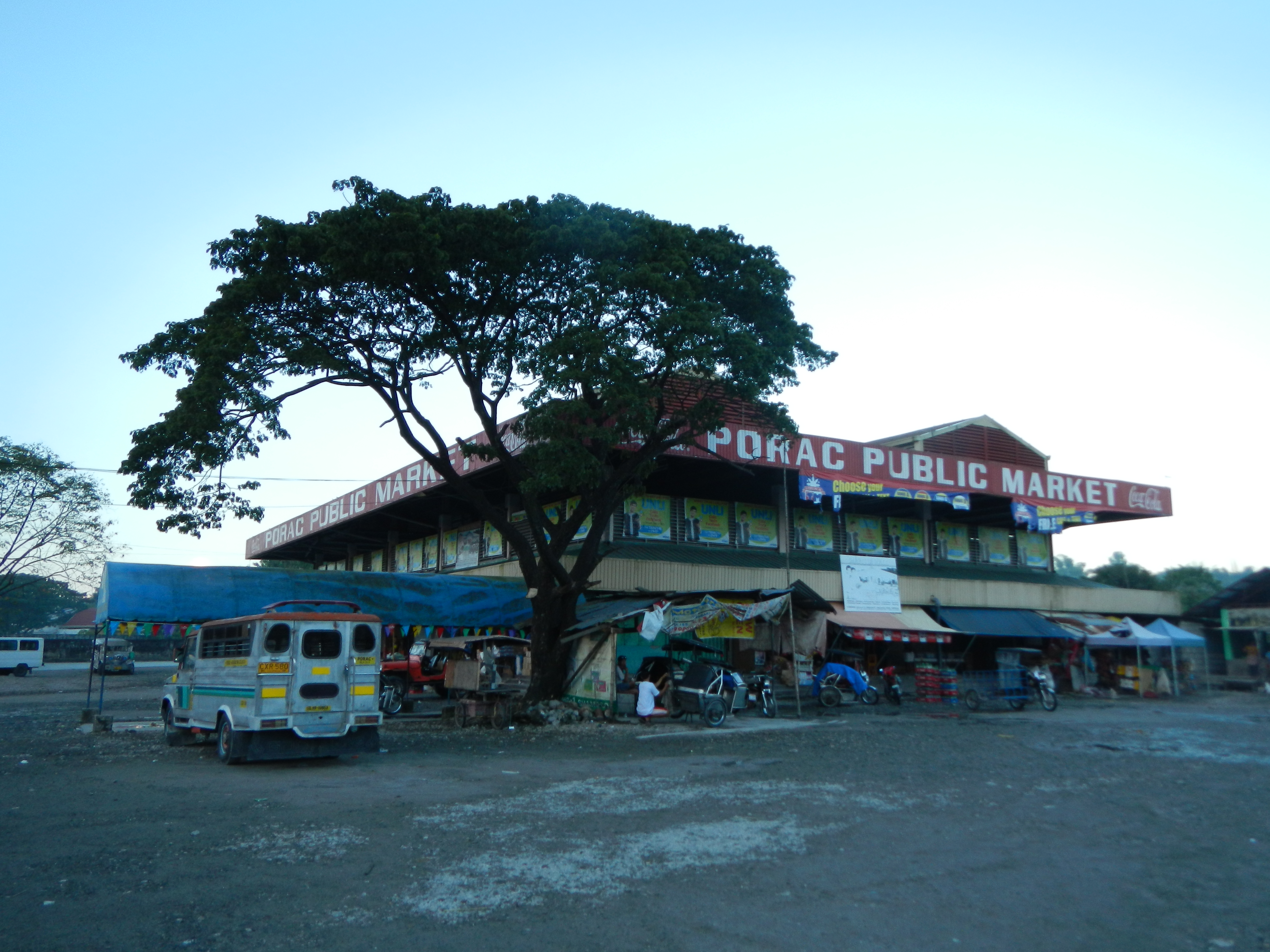
Public Market

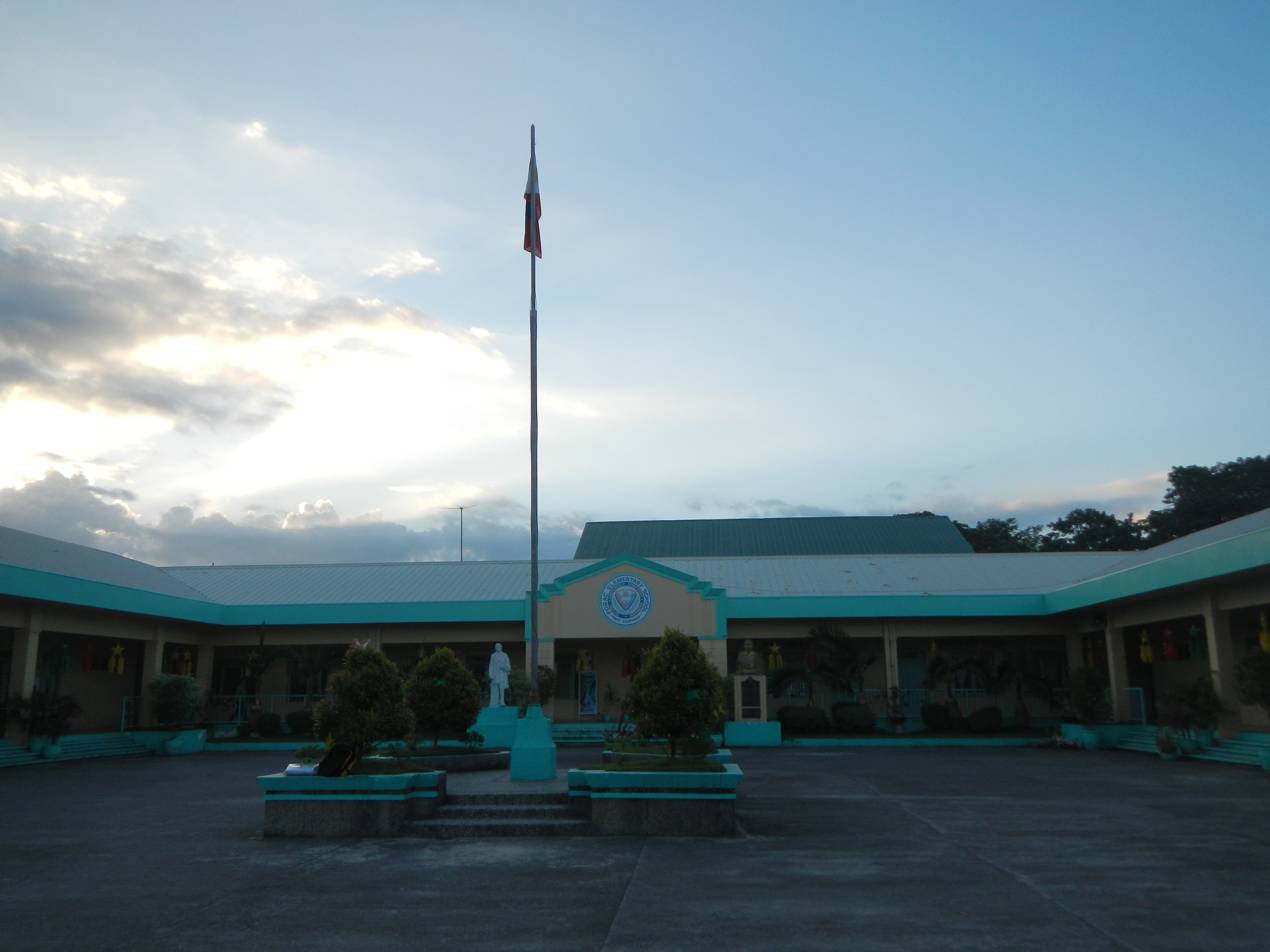
Porac Elementary School
