= Saint Catherine of Alexandria Parish Church (Porac) =

Roman Catholic church in Pampanga, Philippines

Porac Church
- Saint Catherine of Alexandria Parish Church
- Santa Catalina de Alejandria Parish Church
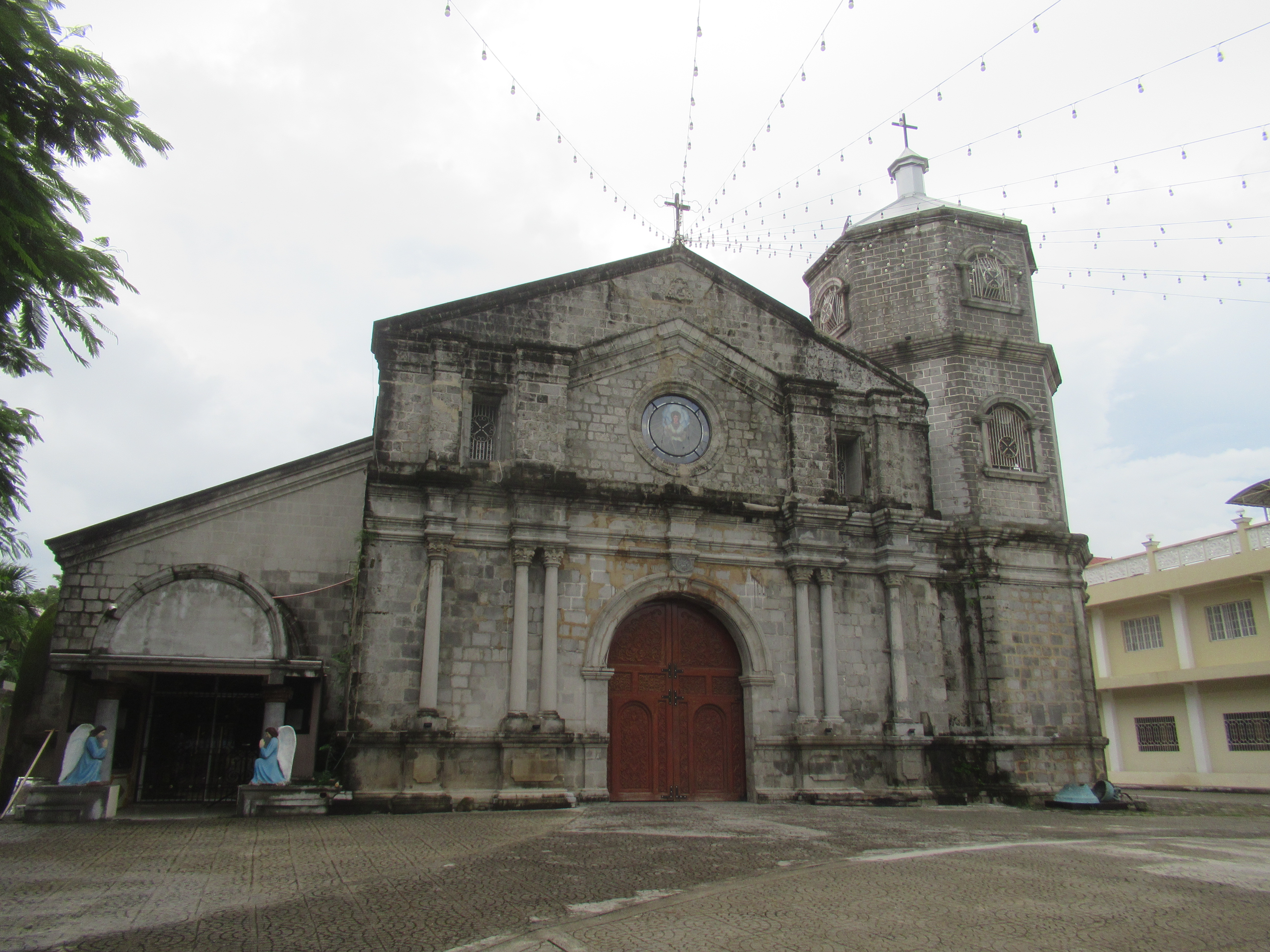
- Church facade in 2023

- Location in Luzon Location in the Philippines
- 15°04′21″N 120°32′24″E
- Location: Poblacion, Porac, Pampanga
- Country: Philippines
- Denomination: Roman Catholic

History
- Dedication: Saint Catherine of Alexandria
- Consecrated: 1872

Architecture
- Architect: Fr. Isidro Bernardo
- Architectural type: Church building
- Style: Baroque

Specifications
- Length: 52 metres (171 ft)
- Width: 12 metres (39 ft)
- Height: 9 metres (30 ft)
- Materials: Sand, gravel, cement, mortar, steel and bricks

Administration
- Province: Ecclesiastical Province of San Fernando
- Archdiocese: Roman Catholic Archdiocese of San Fernando

Clergy
- Priest: Rev. Fr. Eduardo de Leon

Saint Catherine of Alexandria Parish Church, commonly known as Porac Church, is a 19th-century Baroque Roman Catholic church located at Barangay Poblacion, Porac, Pampanga, Philippines. The parish church is currently under the ecclesiastical province of the Archdiocese of San Fernando.

The church's octagonal bell tower collapsed during the 6.1 magnitude earthquake on April 22, 2019.

== History ==
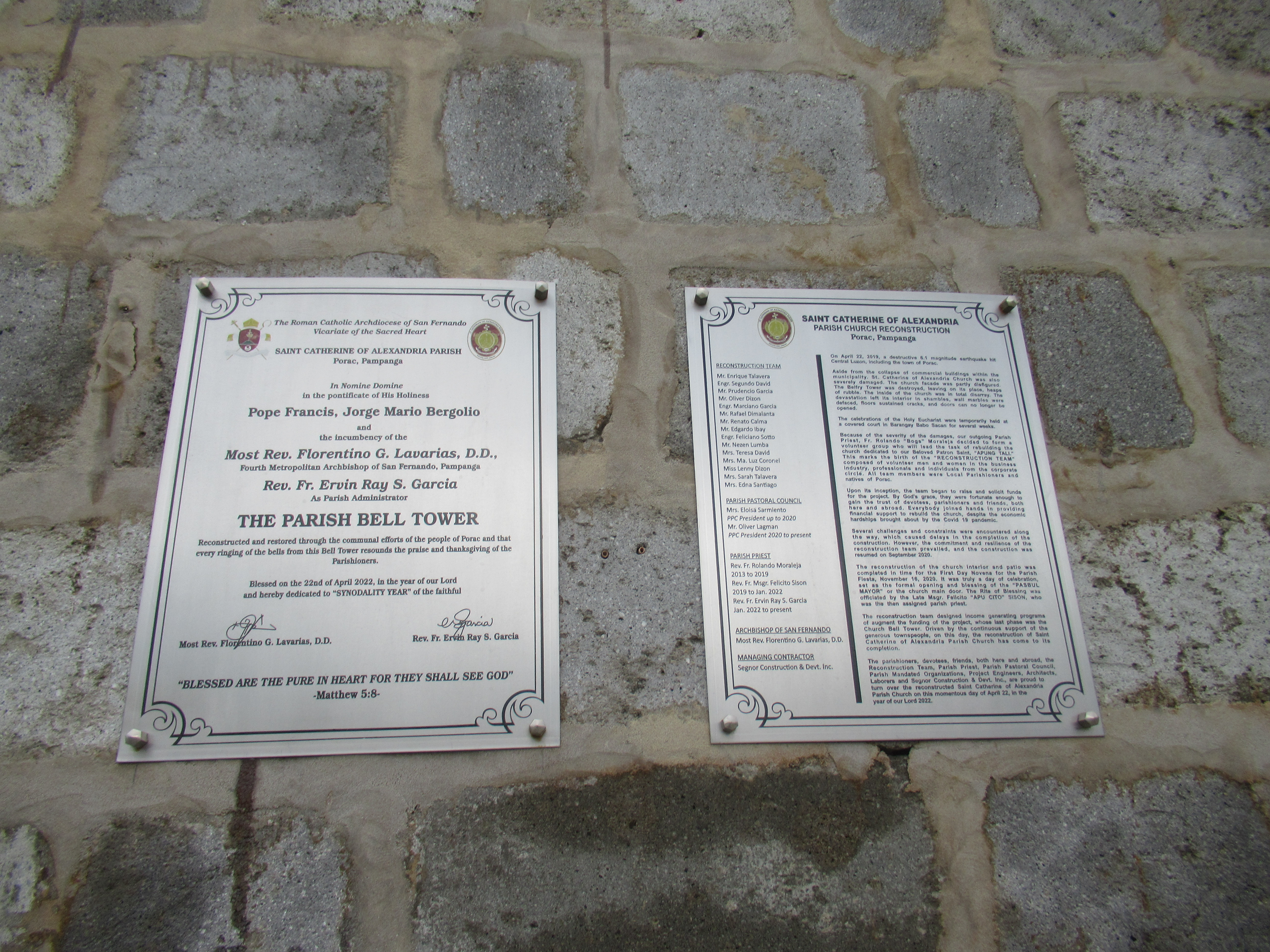
Historical markers of restoration

As early as 1594, Porac had an established convent with the right to vote in the provincial meetings. Despite this, services done by the convent of Porac had been either suspended or annexed to other convents like Lubao and Bacolor, possibly due to lack of resources and/or attacks from the Zambals, an indigenous group living in the areas near the Zambales mountain ranges. Documents, however, give hints of possible construction periods in Porac. In 1710 and 1722, the convent was relieved from paying its rent to the San Agustin Monastery in Manila.

On September 31, 1734, the convent received permission from the Provincial Fathers to use the funds of the convent to build a church. The first masonry church of Porac may have been finished around this time with Fathers Manuel Obregon and Nicolas Mornier responsible for its construction.

The 18th-century church may have sustained severe damage from the 1863 earthquake because according to records, Father Isidro Bernardo laid the foundations of a new stone church sometime in 1872 and was characterized as having three naves and one transept. The said structure was renovated a couple of times since its erection: by Father Esteban Ibeas, parish priest of Santa Rita, in 1877; and in 1880 by Father Galo de la Galle.

In recent years, much renovations have been executed on the church, especially notable of these are the new naves and transept, which no longer bears any trace of the original stone used in the 19th century. The church and convent were heavily damaged during World War II. Father Daniel Castrillo, the last Augustinian priest of the parish, had the church reinforced with concrete, made other restorations and rebuilt the convent. In the 1980s, the nave and transept of the church were torn down to make the more spacious church seen today.

=== 2019 Luzon earthquake ===
On April 22, 2019, a 6.1 magnitude earthquake struck the island of Luzon, leaving at least 18 dead, three missing and injuring at least 256 others. Despite the epicenter being in Zambales, most of the damage to infrastructure occurred in the neighboring province of Pampanga, which suffered damage to 29 buildings and structures, including churches.

During the earthquake, the church suffered heavy damage when rubble from the bell tower fell on the nave of the church. Only the ground level of the four-story bell tower was left standing.

== Architecture ==
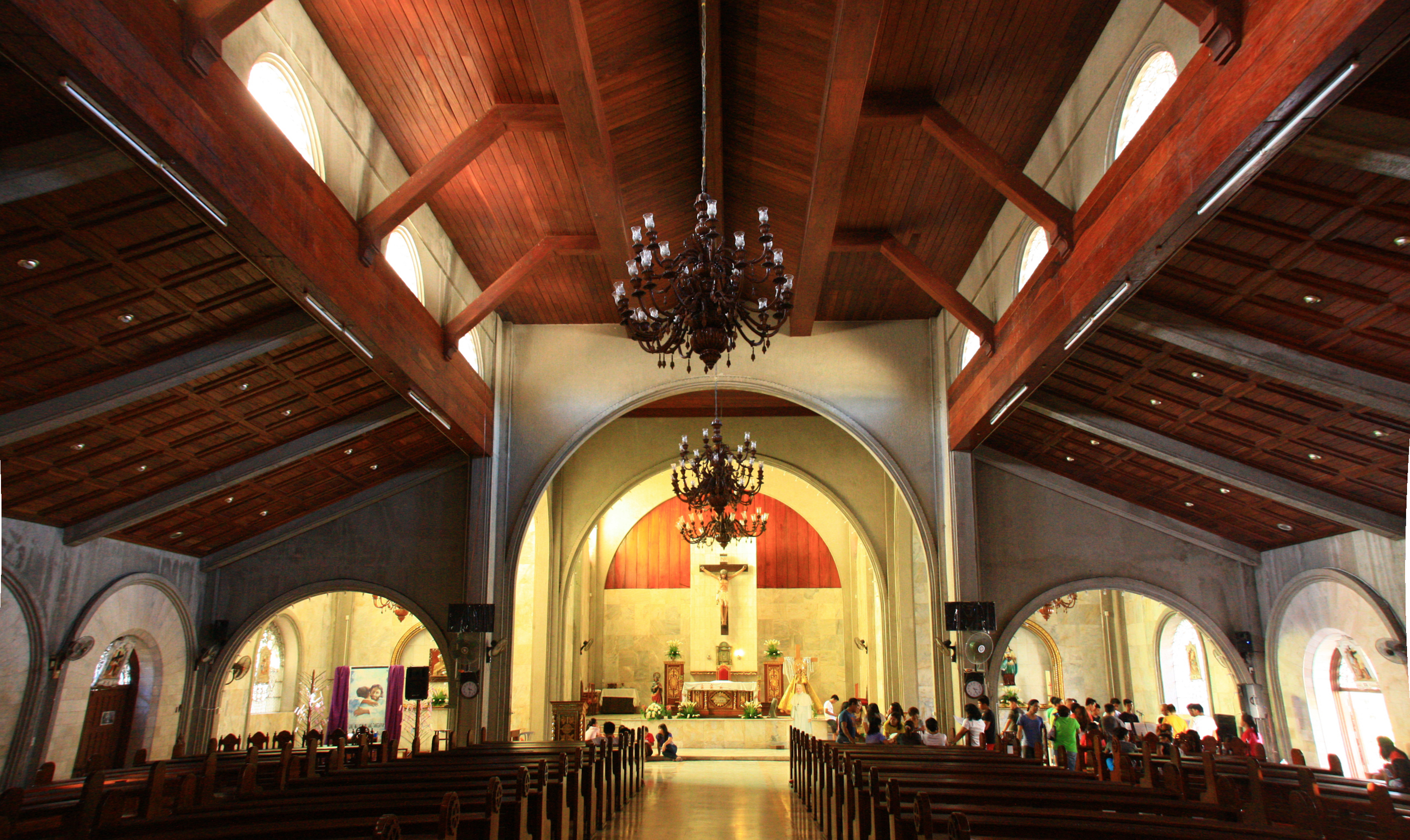
Church interior in 2014

The church measures 52 metres (171 ft) long, 12 metres (39 ft) wide and 9 metres (30 ft) high. The façade is simple, adorned only by Corinthian columns of its first and second levels, iron grills on the windows, the Augustinian emblem on the triangular pediment and rectangular pilasters. The main focal point of the façade is the rose window bearing an image of Saint Catherine of Alexandria rendered on stained glass. Attached to the left of the church is a slender, 4-storey, octagonal bell tower.

== Gallery ==
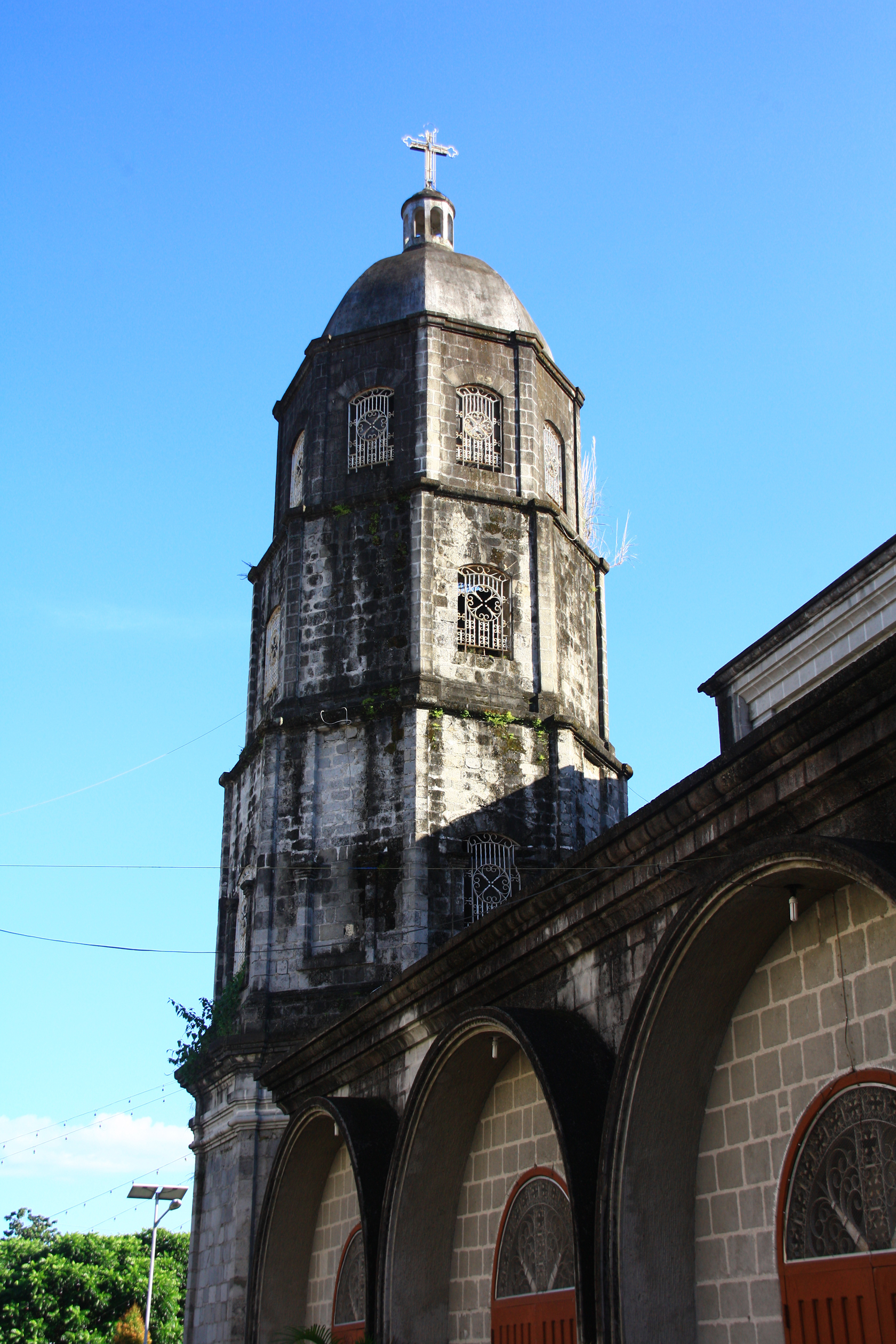
Bell tower in 2014

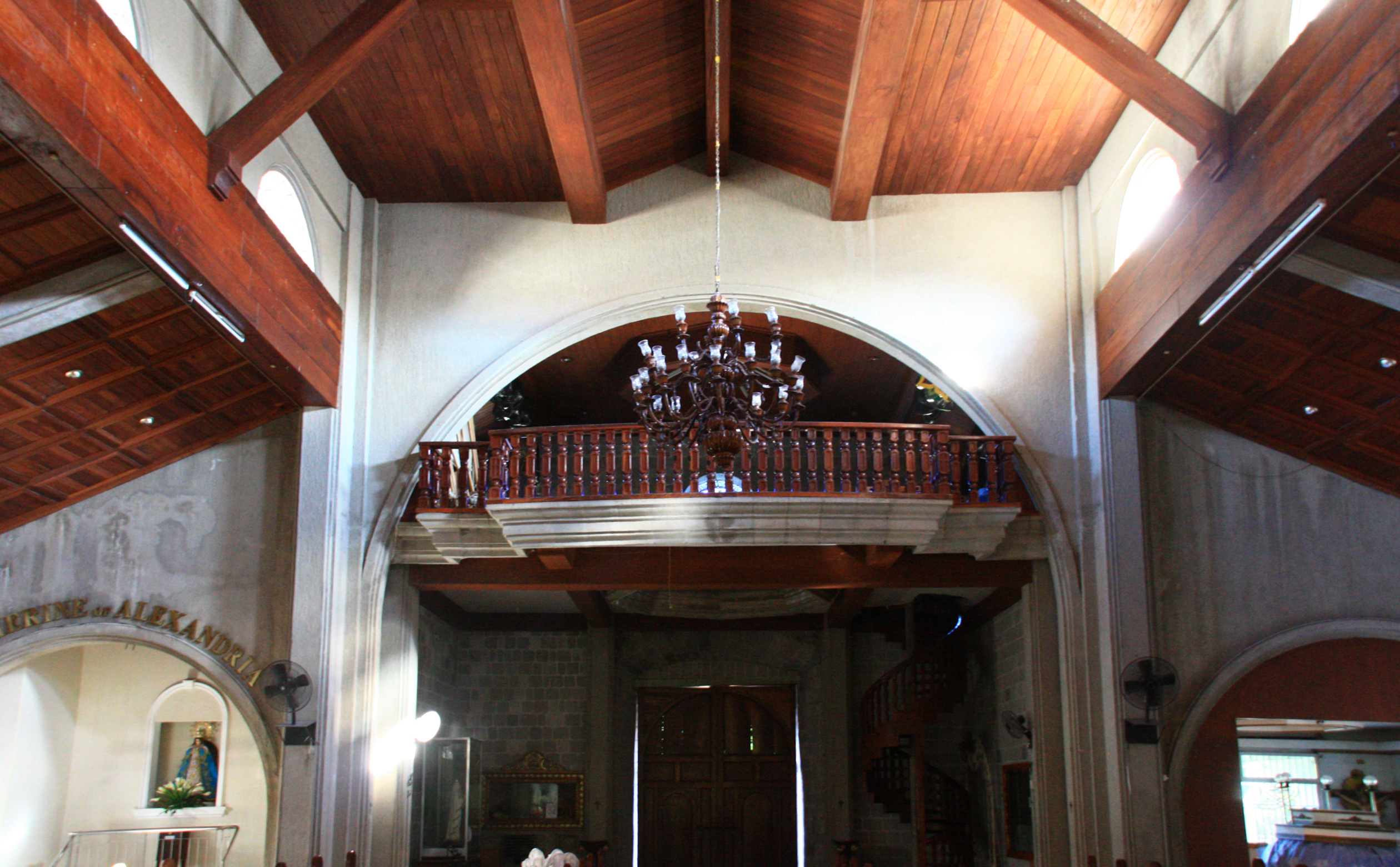
Choir loft

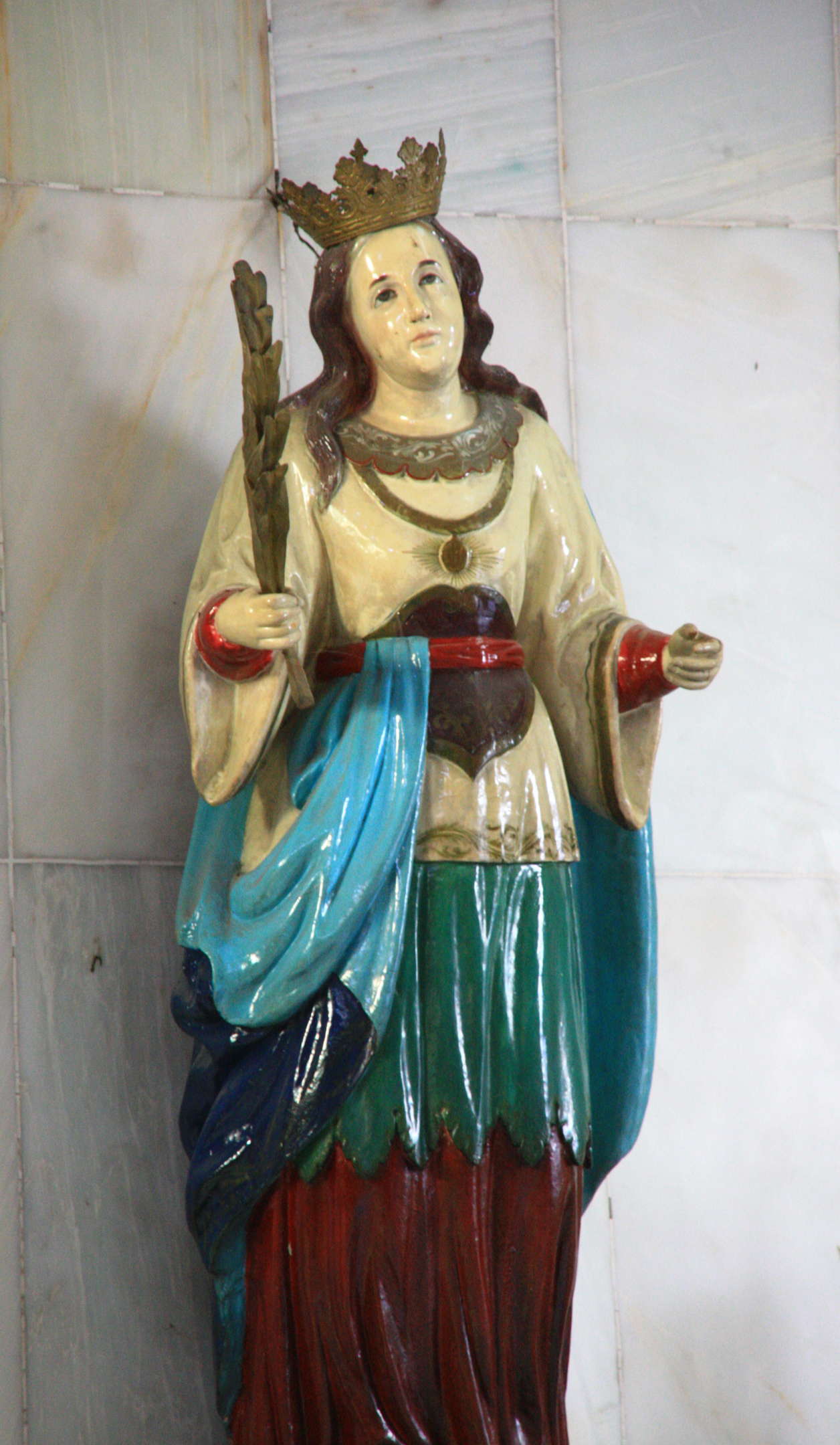
Image of Saint Catherine of Alexandria

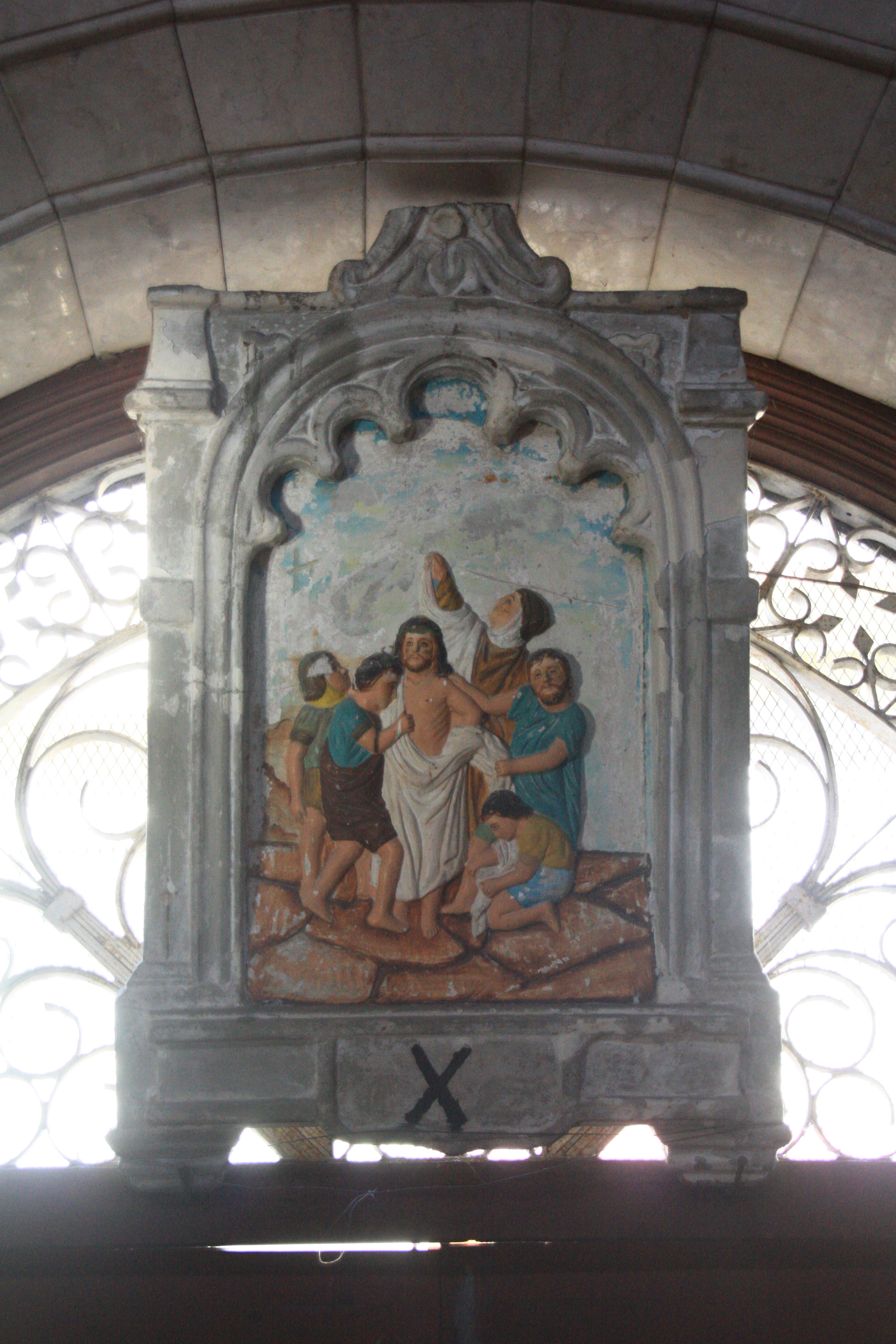
Stations of the Cross relief

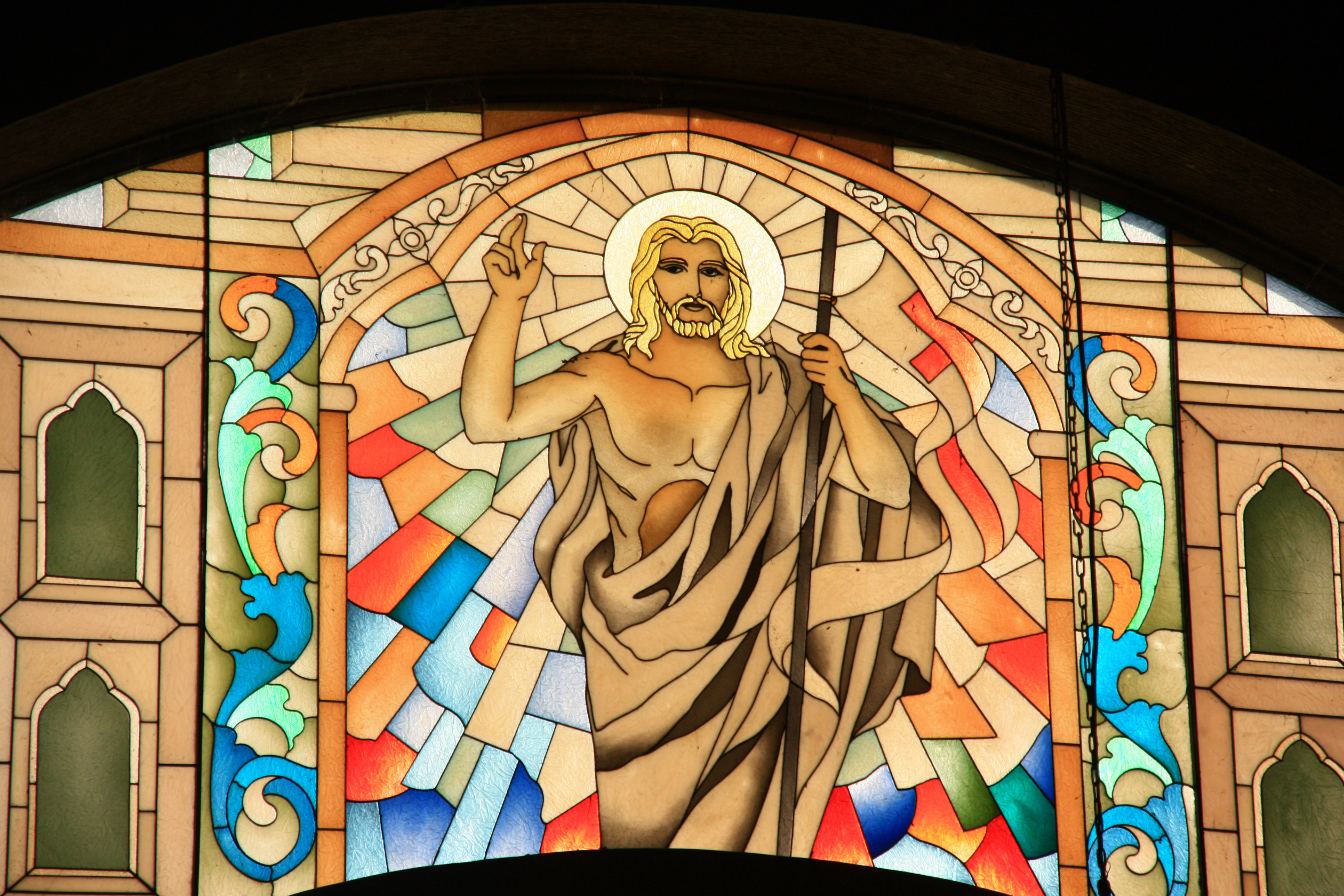
Stained glass art

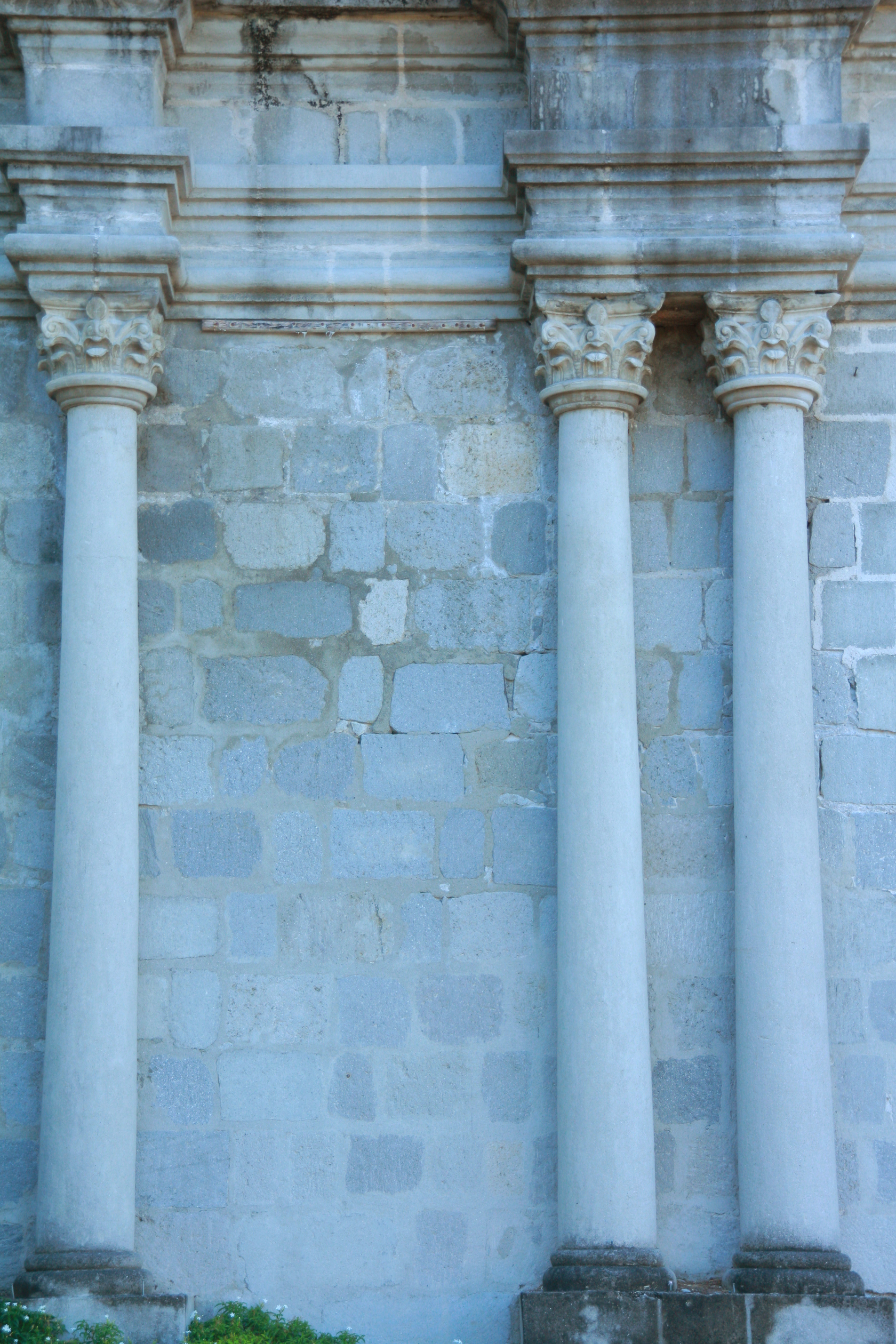
Columns with Corinthian capitals

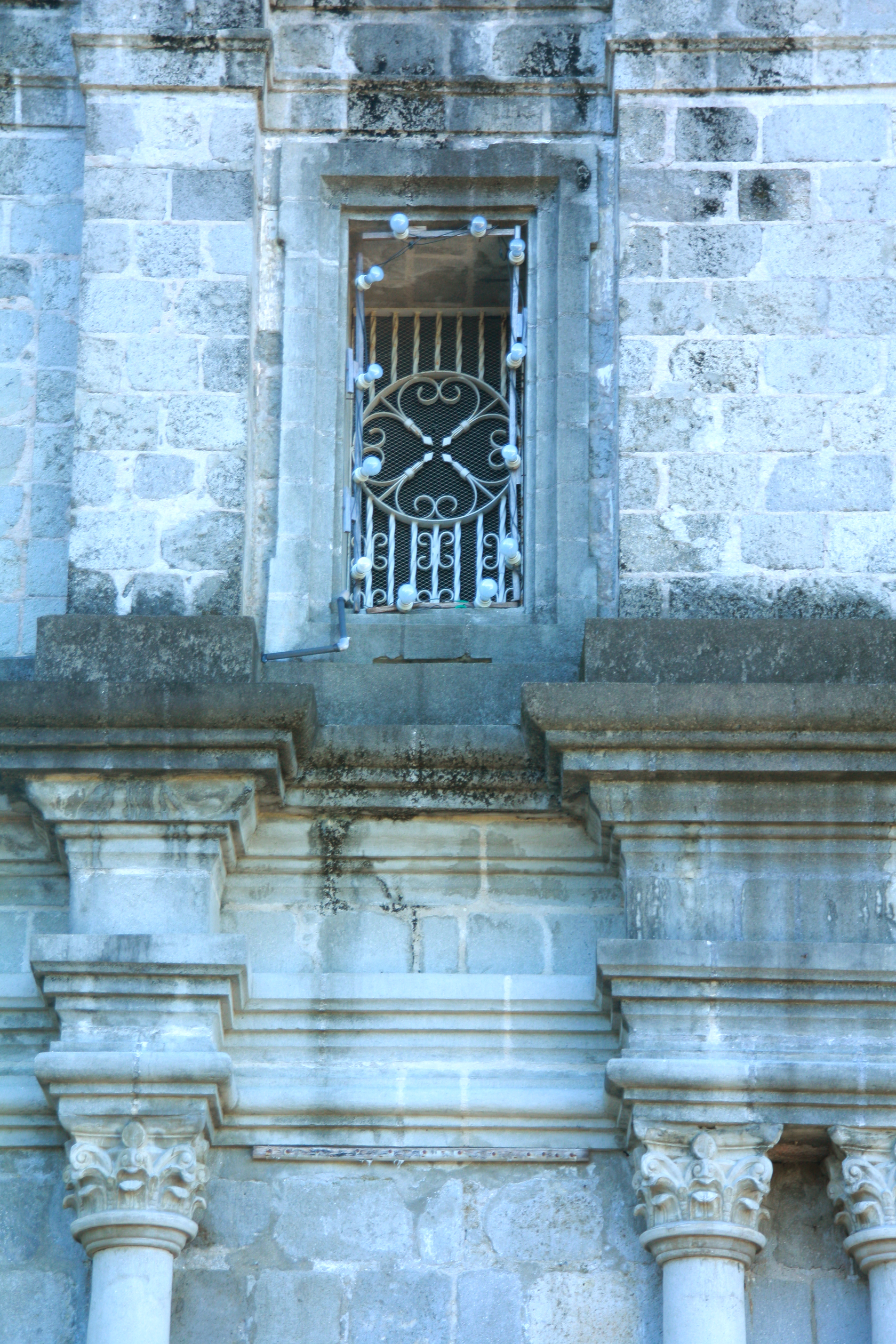
Rectangular window

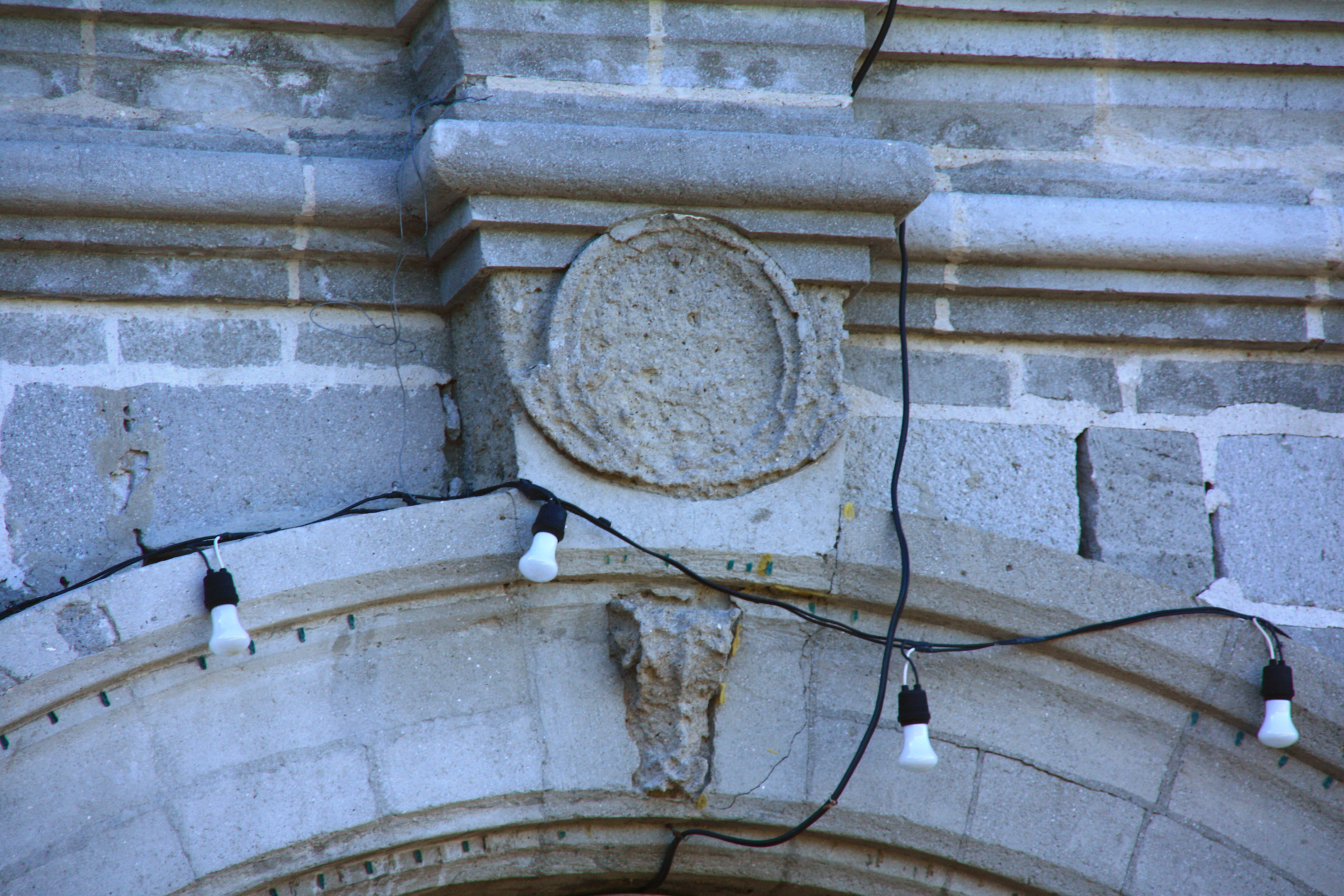
Eroded emblem atop the main portal

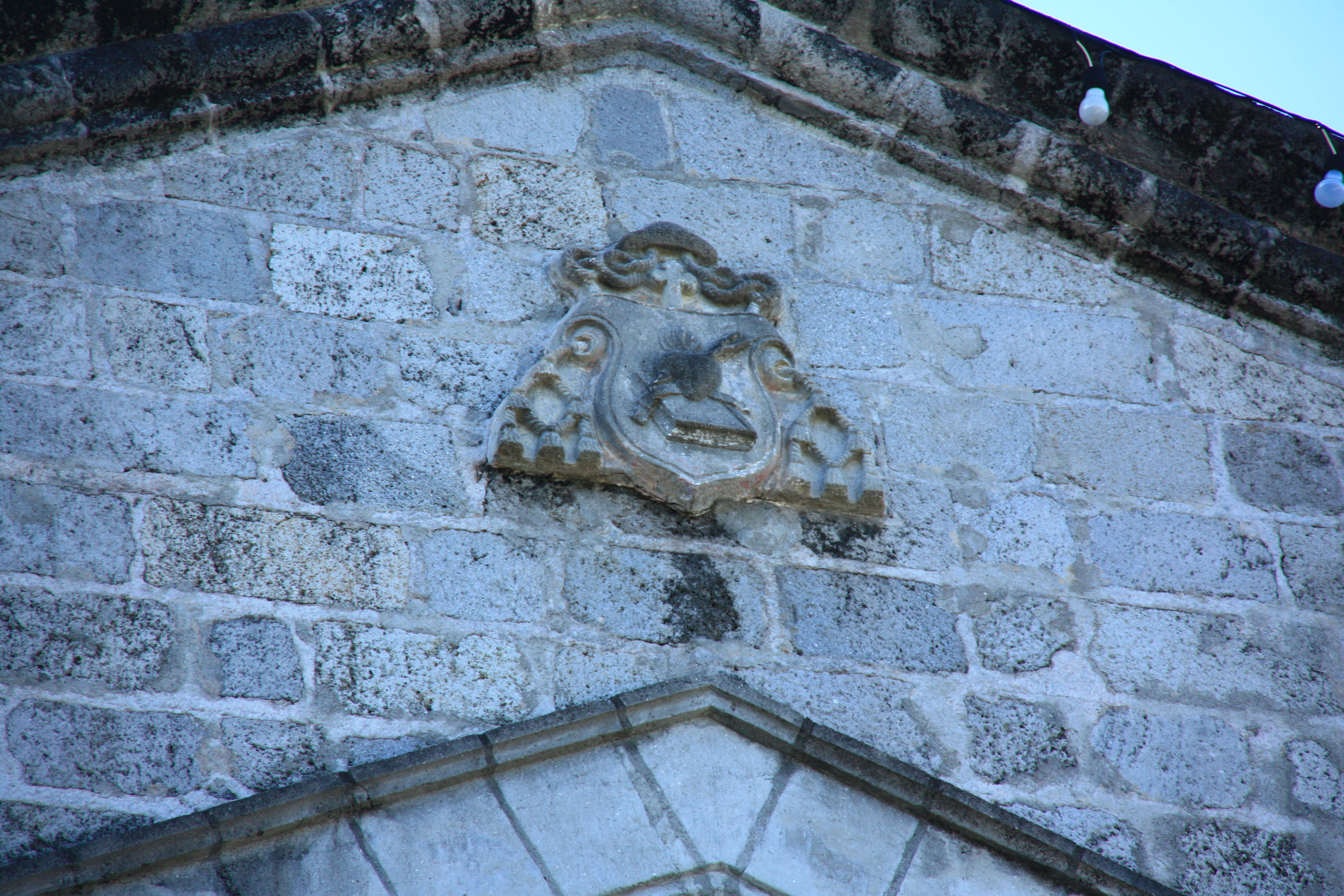
Augustinian emblem at the pediment

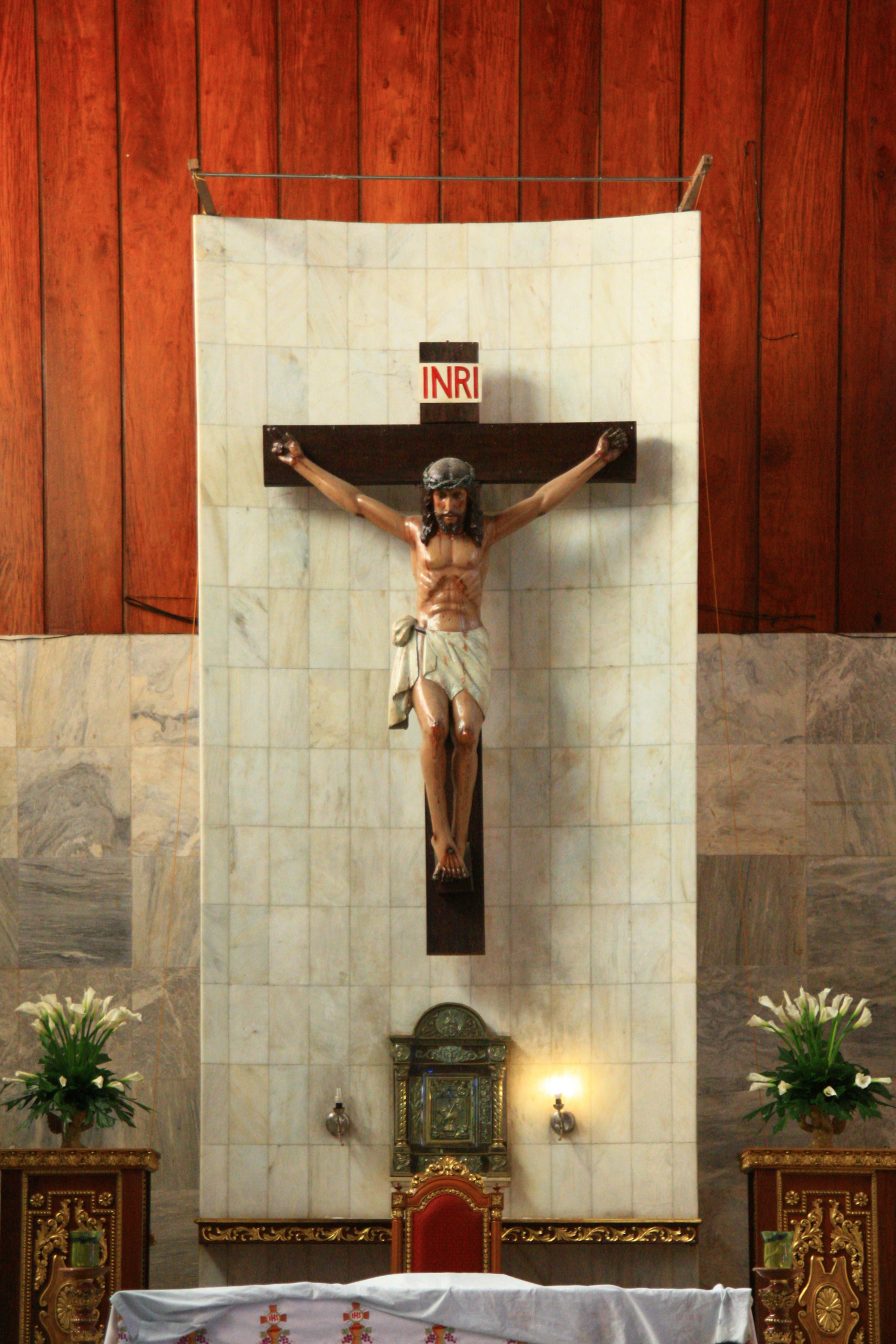
Main altarpiece

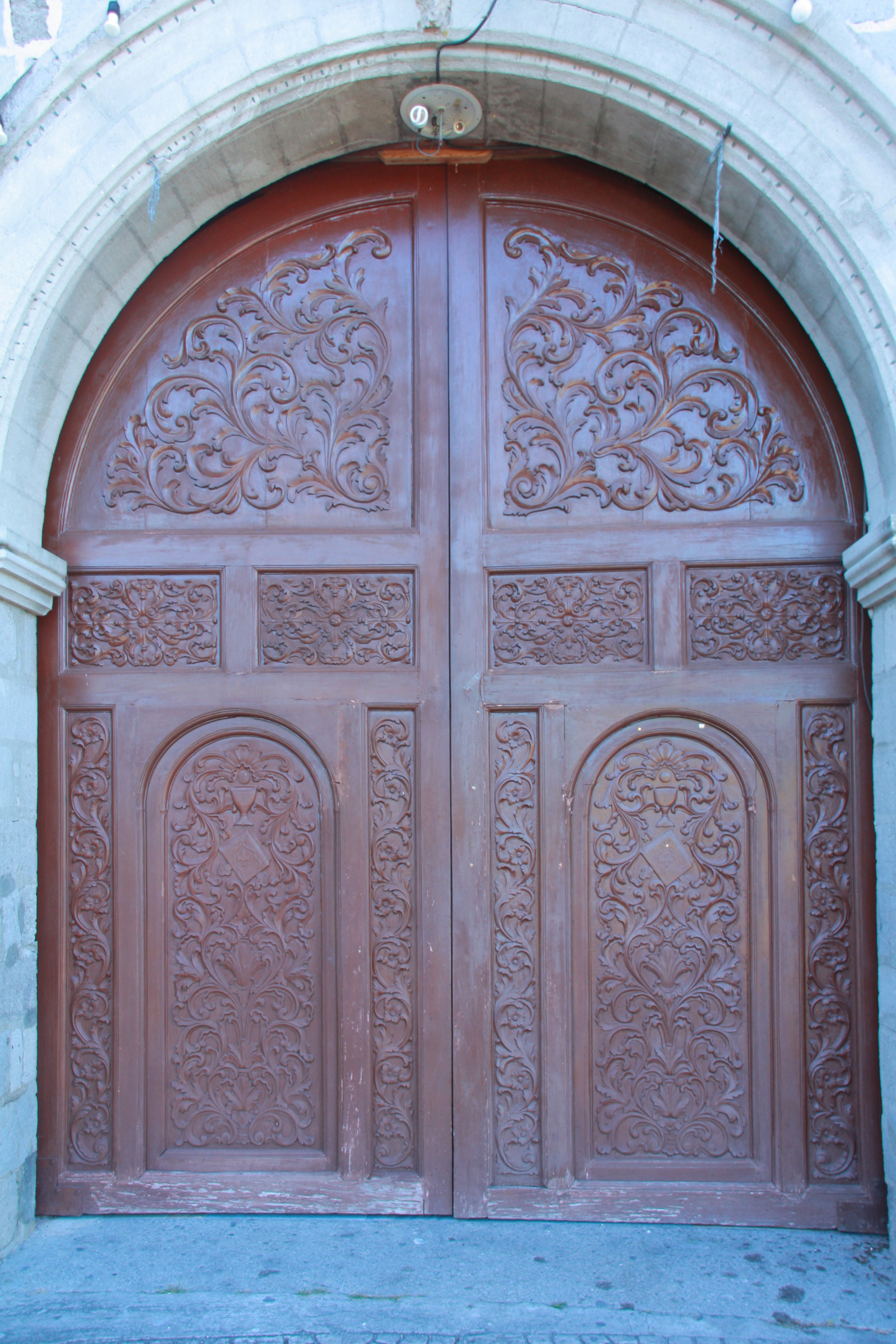
Main door

== See also ==
- Pio Chapel
