= Macapagal =

Macapagal (rare variant: Makapagal; Tagalog: [makapaˈɡal]) is a Filipino surname derived from the Kapampangan language.

The following are people possessing the Macapagal surname:

== People ==
- Don Juan Macapagal (d. 1683), former prince of Tondo and first documented bearer of the surname. Great-grandson of Lakandula
- Lazaro Macapagal (c. 1860s), officer of the revolutionary army during the Philippine Revolution. Commanding officer ordered to execute Andrés Bonifacio
- Angel Macapagal, (1917–1993), Filipino lawyer and politician
- Diosdado Macapagal (1910–1997), former 9th President of the Philippines and 5th Vice President of the Philippines
  - Gloria Macapagal Arroyo (born 1947), daughter of Diosdado Macapagal; former Speaker of the House of Representatives of the Philippines, 14th President of the Philippines and 10th Vice President of the Philippines
    - Mikey Macapagal Arroyo (born 1969), son of Gloria Macapagal Arroyo; served as representative and vice governor of Pampanga
    - Diosdado Macapagal Arroyo (born 1974), son of Gloria Macapagal Arroyo; served as representative of Camarines Sur
- Jake Macapagal (born 1965/1966), Filipino actor

== Places ==
- Diosdado Macapagal Boulevard, motorway in Metro Manila
- Macapagal Bridge, bridge in Butuan, Agusan del Sur
- President Diosdado P. Macapagal Highway, highway in Davao Oriental

== See also ==
- Macapagal family
