= Pangan =

Pangan is a Filipino surname of Kapampangan origin. Notable people with the surname include:

- Augusto Valdes Pangan Sr. (1932–1997), Filipino actor and comedian
- Angel Pangan Macapagal, (1917–1993), Filipino lawyer and politician
- Diosdado Pangan Macapagal Sr. (1910–1997), 9th president of the Philippines
- Honey Lacuna-Pangan (born 1965), Filipino physician and politician
- Jett Pangan (born 1968), Filipino actor and musician
- John Rex Pangan (born 2006), A seminarian of the Emmanuel Servants of The Holy Trinity
