= Angel Macapagal =

Filipino lawyer and politician (1917–1993)

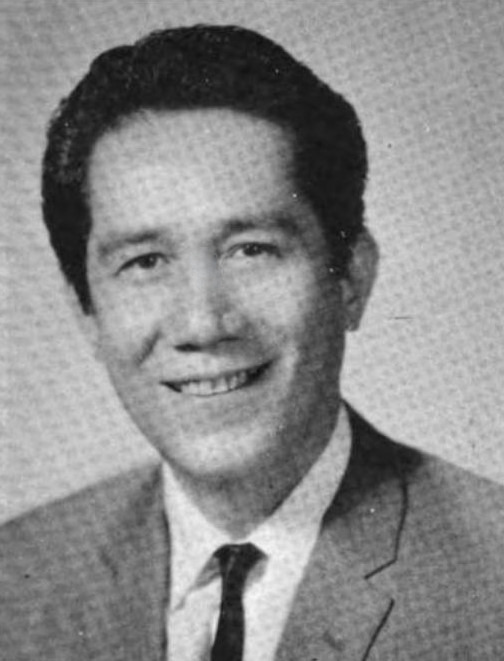
- Macapagal's official portrait during the 6th Congress

Member of the Philippine House of Representatives from Pampanga's 2nd district
- In office December 30, 1965 – December 30, 1969
- Preceded by: Emilio P. Cortez
- Succeeded by: Rogelio Tiglao

Vice Governor of Pampanga
- In office December 30, 1963 – December 30, 1965
- Governor: Francisco Nepomuceno
- Preceded by: Rodolfo Hizon
- Succeeded by: Amado Castillo

Personal details
- Born: October 2, 1917 Lubao, Pampanga, Philippine Islands
- Died: November 6, 1993 (aged 76) Los Angeles, California, U.S.
- Party: Liberal (1963–1993)
- Spouse: Lorenza Dabu
- Relations: Macapagal family
- Children: 7
- Relatives: Diosdado Macapagal (brother); Gloria Macapagal Arroyo (niece)
- Education: Quezon Colleges (LLB)

Angel "Star" Pangan Macapagal (October 2, 1917 – November 6, 1993) was a Filipino lawyer, war veteran, and politician who served as the representative for Pampanga's 2nd congressional district in the Philippine House of Representatives from 1965 to 1969.

He is the brother of former Philippine president Diosdado Macapagal.

== Early life and education ==
Angel Pangan Macapagal was born on October 2, 1917, in Lubao, Pampanga, as the third of four children of Urbano Macapagal and Romana Pangan. He attended Lubao Elementary School and Lubao Institute for his primary and secondary education, respectively. He later earned a Bachelor of Laws degree from Quezon Colleges in Manila.

== Early career ==
Macapagal was a veteran of World War II and took part in the Bataan Death March.

He began his government service as a clerk at the Surplus Property Commission, where he worked from 1947 to 1949. From 1950, he served as private secretary to his brother, then representative Diosdado Macapagal. He continued in the position until Diosdado's election as vice president in 1957 and later served in the same capacity until 1961. He subsequently served as private secretary during his brother's presidency from 1962 to 1963. In 1963, he became a board member and general manager of the People's Homesite and Housing Corporation.

That same year, Macapagal was elected vice governor of Pampanga and served as acting governor for four months.

In March 1964, Macapagal was among those targeted in a pre-election attack by Senate President Ferdinand Marcos, who accused him, his brother, President Diosdado Macapagal, and members of the Montano clan in Cavite of involvement in a tobacco-smuggling operation in a highly publicized exposé.

== House of Representatives ==
Macapagal was elected to the House of Representatives in 1965 under the Liberal Party, representing Pampanga's 2nd congressional district. During the 6th Congress, he served as chairman of the House Committee on the National Language, vice chairman of the Committee on Chartered Cities, and a member of seven other committees.

Macapagal authored legislative measures concerning social benefits for the elderly and indigent, modeled after a system in New Zealand, and increasing household wages to help families meet their needs.

In 1967, Macapagal nominated the United Poets Laureate International for the Nobel Peace Prize, citing its promotion of "world brotherhood and peace through poetry."

== Personal life ==
Macapagal was married to Lorenzo Dabu, with whom he had seven children. He died on November 6, 1993, in Los Angeles, California.

== Electoral history ==
Electoral history of Angel Macapagal
Year	Office	Party	Votes received				Result
Year	Office	Party	Total	%	P.	Swing	Result
1963	Vice Governor of Pampanga	Liberal	—N/a	—N/a	1st	—N/a	Won
1965	Representative (Pampanga–2nd)	Liberal	38,563	48.72%	1st	—N/a	Won

House of Representatives of the Philippines
Preceded by Emilio P. Cortez	Member of the Philippine House of Representatives for Pampanga's 2nd district 1965–1969	Succeeded by Rogelio Tiglao
Political offices
Preceded by Rodolfo Hizon	Vice Governor of Pampanga; 1963–1965	Succeeded by Amado Castillo
