= Lázaro Macapagal =

Filipino lieutenant colonel and executioner

Lázaro Macapagal y Olaes (December 17, 1871 – unknown) was a lieutenant colonel in the Philippine Revolution, known for being the executioner of Andrés Bonifacio and his brother Procopio Bonifacio in 1897 under the orders of the Consejo dela Guerra (Council of War) headed by Mariano Noriel.

He is a direct descendant of Don Juan Macapagal, a prince and ecomendiero of Tondo, and relative of Diosdado Macapagal, the 9th president of the Philippines and Gloria Macapagal Arroyo, the 14th President of the Philippines.

== In popular culture ==
- Portrayed by Hero Bautista in the 2012 film, El Presidente.
- Portrayed by Mike Gayoso in the 2014 film, Bonifacio: Ang Unang Pangulo.
