= Macapagal family =

Filipino political family

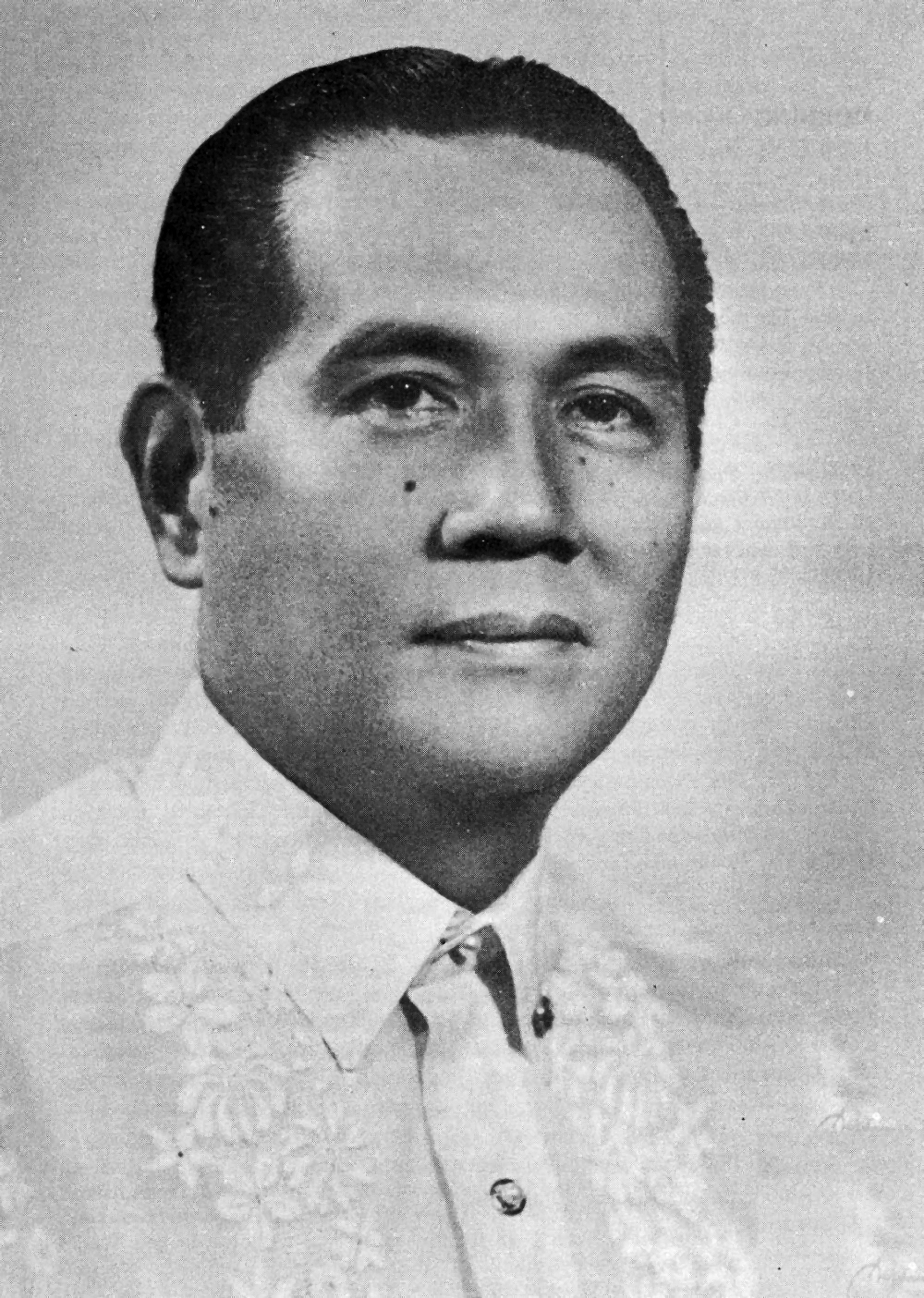
Diosdado Macapagal, the 9th president

The Macapagal family is a political family based in Pampanga which include presidents and senators and originally an aristocracy in Tondo. Don Juan Macapagal was a former prince of Tondo. Don Juan Macapagal was given the title Maestre de Campo General of the natives Arayat, Candaba and Apalit for his aid in suppressing the Kapampangan Revolt of 1660.

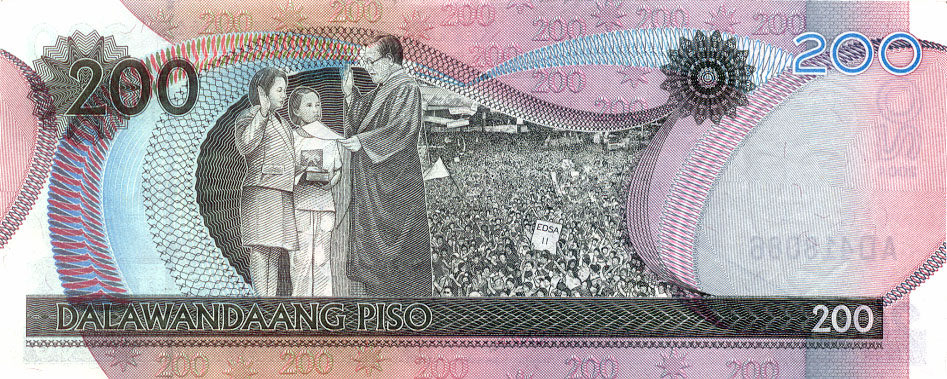
Investiture of Gloria Macapagal as the 14th president of The Philippines on a monetary bill.

Both father and daughter, Diosdado Macapagal and Gloria Macapagal were both doctorates in Economy and presidents.
