= Juan Macapagal =

Datu of Arayat in Pampanga, Philippines

Don Juan Macapagal, Datu of Arayat, was the great-grandson and the most eminent descendant of the last ruling Lakan of Tondo, Don Carlos Lacandola. Don Juan Macapagal was given the title Maestre de Campo General of the natives Arayat, Candaba and Apalit for his aid in suppressing the Kapampangan Revolt of 1660. He further aided the Spanish crown in suppressing the Pangasinan Revolt of Don Andres Malong in the same year, and the Ilocano Revolt of 1661. Don Juan Macapagal died in 1683. Don Juan Macapagal is a direct ancestor of Philippine Revolutionary General, Lázaro Macapagal and two former Philippine Presidents Diosdado Macapagal and his daughter, Gloria Macapagal Arroyo.

== Ancestry ==
When he asked for more privileges to be given to his family, Spanish authorities required proof of his descent from the old Lord of Tondo. The records showed that his parents were Capitan Don Gonzalo Capulong and Dona Maria Bina; Don Gonzalo Capulong was the son of Don Dionisio Capulong, the eldest son of Don Carlos Lacandola. The signature of Don Dionisio Capulong (c. 1594–1607) was found in the UST archives Libro 22, as published by Alberto Santamaría in his article El “Baybayin” en el Archivo de Santo Tomas, in Unitas Vol. XVI No. 8, February 1938. Courtesy of Christopher Ray Miller, Ph.D., 2011.

He had at least 4 brothers and a sister: Don Juan de Guevarra, Don Miguel Alfonso de Lapira, Don Nicolas Lacandola, and Dona Cathalina Bina. He himself had 5 children, who were Dona Maria Macapagal, Don Francisco Macapagal, Don Pablo Macapagal, Don Salvador Macapagal, and Don Piotenciano Macapagal.

== Civilian life ==
Don Juan Macapagal occupied the post of juez de sementeras of the town Arayat twice before becoming its governor five times in a row. He was also commissioned by the Spanish crown to conduct the supply of silver from Pangasinan through Zambales.

== Military career ==
Don Juan Macapagal started out as a corporal of a squad of native soldiers. He later rose to the rank of sargento capitan of the infantry. Fighting under Spanish captain Sebastian Castelu, Macapagal help pacify the northern frontiers of the province of Pampanga, which then extends all the way up north to Cagayan Valley. He was wounded during the suppression of the Chinese uprising in 1639 and in suppressing a minor Kapampangan uprising in 1641. In 1660, he was given the title Maestre de Campo General of the natives Arayat, Candaba and Apalit for his aid in suppressing the Kapampangan Revolt of 1660.

Don Juan Macapagal was also one of the few natives of the Philippines to become an encomendero or a feudal lord under the Spanish crown. In order to gain his support suppressing the Ilocano Revolt of 1661, the Spanish crown awarded him an encomienda or a fief that once belonged to ex-Governor General Don Diego Fajardo y Chacon. The fief was worth 500 ducados of tributes of Negritos from the province of Zambales. After the collapse of the Ilocano Revolt and the execution of 133 of its leaders, Macapagal further received the honor of becoming the Maestre de Campo of the Kapampangan Regiment that guarded Fort Santiago.

Because of his outstanding career in the service of the Spanish crown, quite rare for a native of the Philippines during that era, the Spanish authorities decided to revive the special rights and privileges offered by the Spanish crown to Don Carlos Lacandola and all his descendants throughout the province of Pampanga.

== Descendants ==
Don Juan Macapagal is a direct paternal ancestor of former Philippine President Diosdado Macapagal the 9th president of the republic and his daughter, former Philippine President Gloria Macapagal Arroyo, the 14th president of the republic.

== See also ==
- Lakandula
