= Diosdado Macapagal =

President of the Philippines from 1961 to 1965

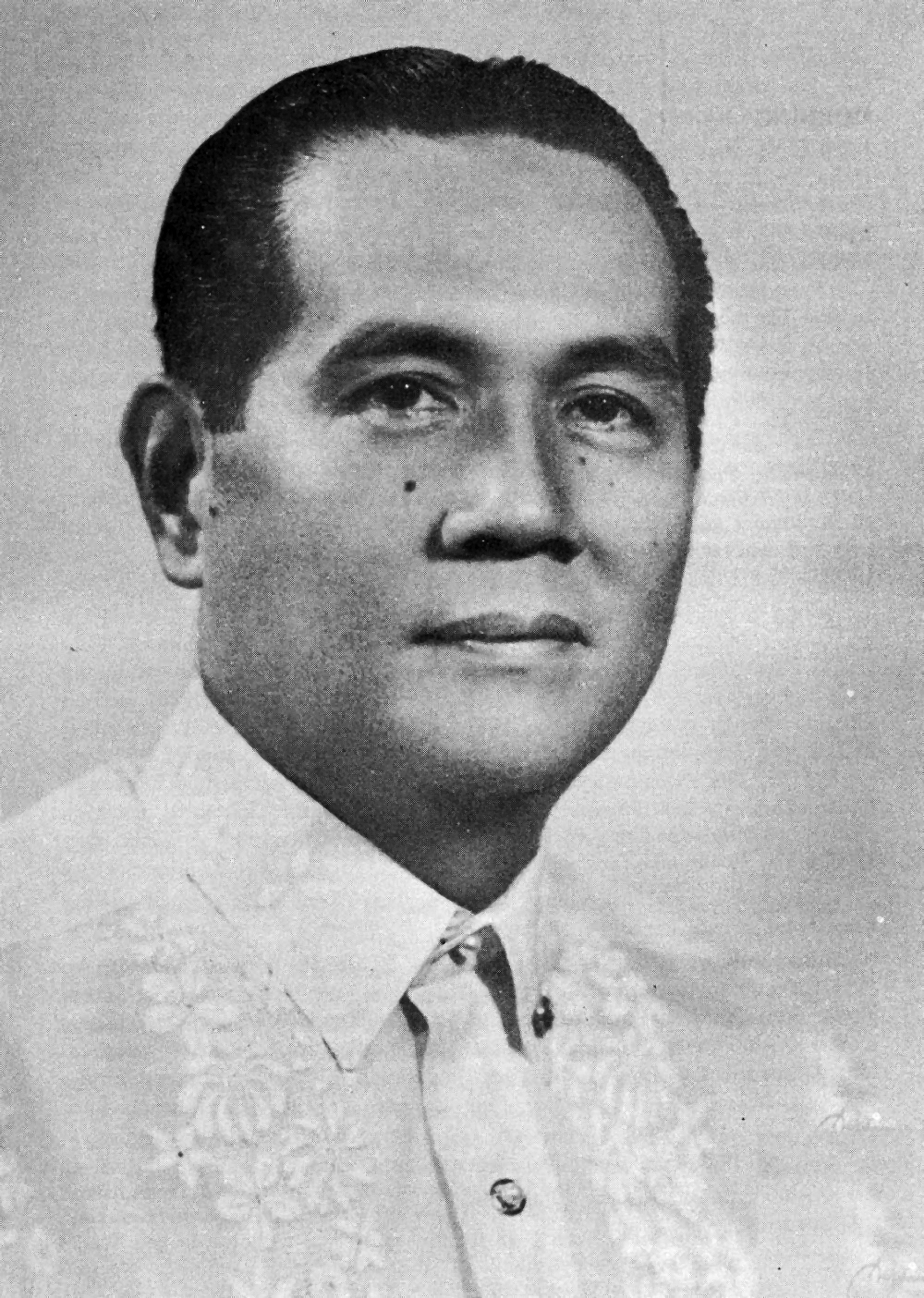
- Official portrait, 1962

9th President of the Philippines
- In office December 30, 1961 – December 30, 1965
- Vice President: Emmanuel Pelaez
- Preceded by: Carlos P. Garcia
- Succeeded by: Ferdinand Marcos

5th Vice President of the Philippines
- In office December 30, 1957 – December 30, 1961
- President: Carlos P. Garcia
- Preceded by: Carlos P. Garcia
- Succeeded by: Emmanuel Pelaez

Member of the House of Representatives from Pampanga's 1st district
- In office December 30, 1949 – December 30, 1957
- Preceded by: Amado Yuzon
- Succeeded by: Francisco Nepomuceno

2nd President of the 1971 Philippine Constitutional Convention
- In office June 14, 1971 – January 17, 1973
- President: Ferdinand Marcos
- Preceded by: Carlos P. Garcia
- Succeeded by: Position abolished

5th President of the Liberal Party
- In office December 30, 1957 – January 21, 1961
- Preceded by: Eugenio Pérez
- Succeeded by: Ferdinand Marcos

Personal details
- Born: Diosdado Pangan Macapagal; September 28, 1910 Lubao, Pampanga, Philippine Islands
- Died: April 21, 1997 (aged 86) Makati, Philippines
- Resting place: Libingan ng mga Bayani, Taguig, Metro Manila, Philippines; 14°31′11″N 121°2′39″E
- Party: Liberal (1949–1997)
- Other political affiliations: UNIDO (1980–1988)
- Spouses: Purita de la Rosa (m. 1938; died 1943); Eva Macaraeg (m. 1946)
- Relations: Macapagal family
- Children: 4, including Arturo and Gloria
- Relatives: Mikey Arroyo (grandson); Dato Arroyo (grandson); Jose Miguel Arroyo (son-in-law); Rogelio de la Rosa (brother-in-law); Jaime de la Rosa (brother-in-law)
- Education: University of the Philippines, Manila; Philippine Law School; University of Santo Tomas (LL.B, LL.M, DCL), (PHD in Economics)
- Profession: Lawyer; poet; professor; economist

Diosdado Pangan Macapagal Sr. GCrM, KGCR (Tagalog: [djosˈdado makapaˈɡal]; September 28, 1910 – April 21, 1997), also known colloquially as “Apung Dadong”, was the ninth president of the Philippines, serving from 1961 to 1965. He served as the 5th vice president from 1957 to 1961 under Carlos P. Garcia. He also served as a member of the House of Representatives, and headed the Constitutional Convention of 1970. He was the father of Gloria Macapagal Arroyo, who followed his path as President of the Philippines from 2001 to 2010. Diosdado Macapagal Sr is one of the few presidents with doctoral degrees, earning a Doctors of Civil Law degree and a PHD in Economics degree from University of Santo Tomas.

Known as "The Poor Boy From Lubao", he was a native of Lubao, Pampanga. Macapagal graduated from the University of the Philippines and University of Santo Tomas, both in Manila, after which he worked as a lawyer for the government. He first won the election in 1949 to the House of Representatives, representing the 1st district in his home province of Pampanga. In 1957, he became vice president under the rule of President Carlos P. Garcia, whom he later defeated in the 1961 election.

As president, Macapagal worked to suppress graft and corruption and to stimulate the growth of the Philippine economy. He introduced the country's first land reform law, placed the peso on the free currency exchange market, and liberalized foreign exchange and import controls. Many of his reforms, however, were crippled by a Congress dominated by the rival Nacionalista Party. He is also known for shifting the country's observance of Independence Day from July 4 to June 12, commemorating the day President Emilio Aguinaldo unilaterally declared the independence of the First Philippine Republic from the Spanish Empire in 1898. He stood for re-election in 1965 but was defeated by Ferdinand Marcos.

Under Marcos, Macapagal was elected president of the 1970 constitutional convention that would later draft what became the 1973 Constitution, though the manner in which the charter was ratified and modified led him to later question its legitimacy. He died of heart failure, pneumonia, and renal complications, in 1997, at the age of 86.

Macapagal was also a poet in the Spanish language, though his poetic oeuvre was eclipsed by his political biography.

== Early years ==
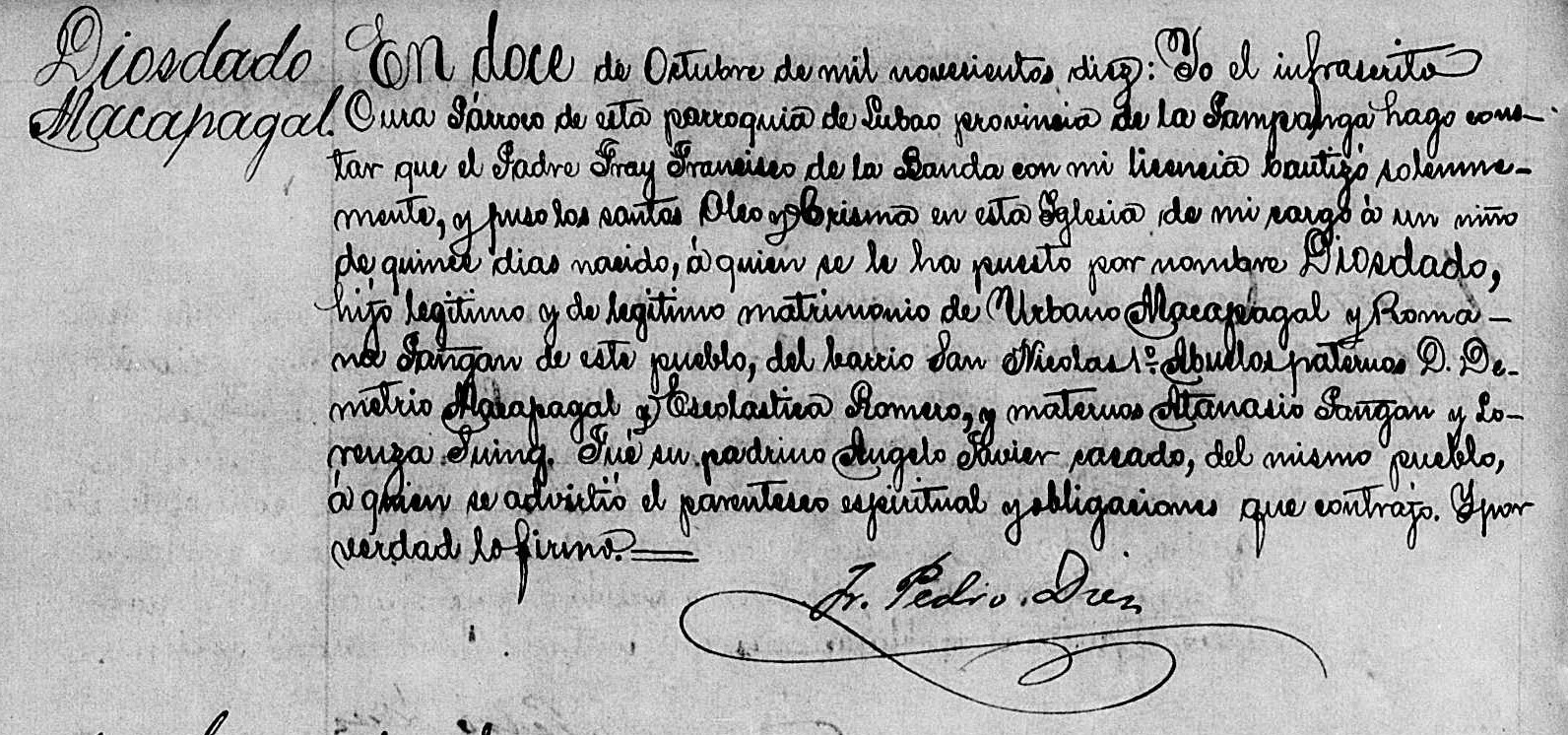
Baptismal record of Diosdado Macapagal issued at the San Agustin Parish Church on October 12, 1910.

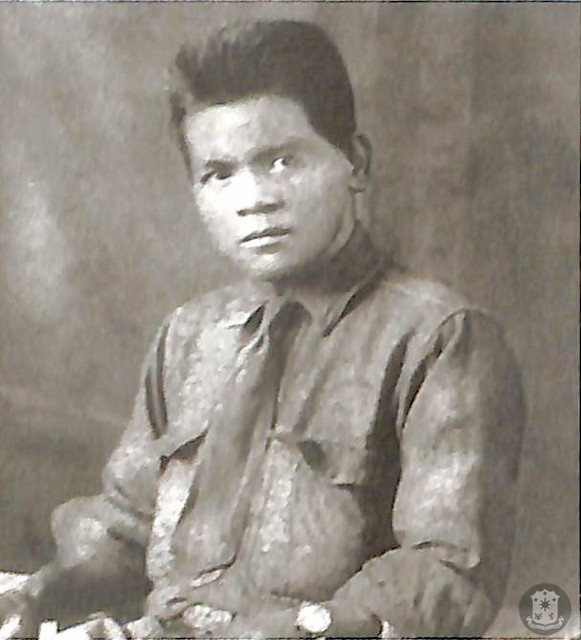
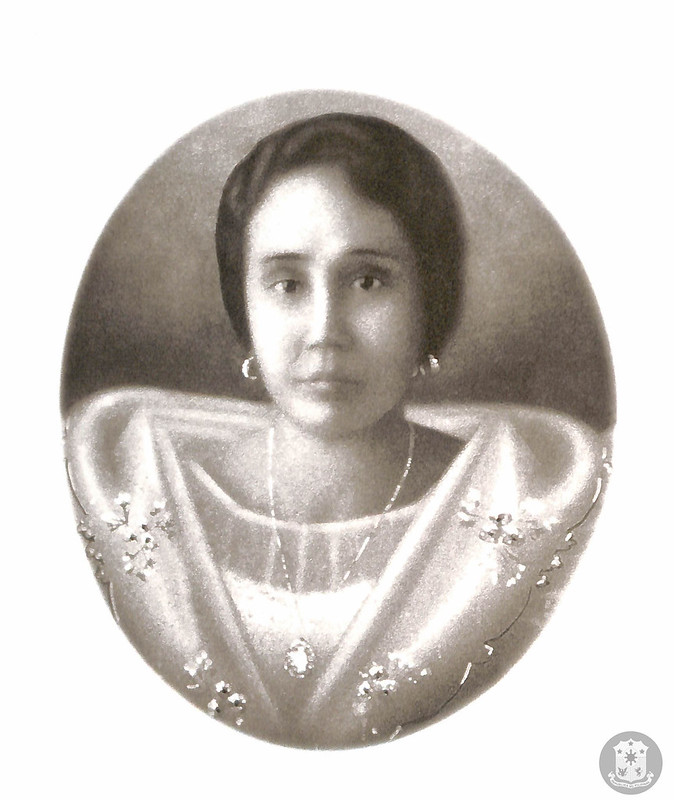
Urbano Macapagal and Romana Pangan, the parents of Diosdado Macapagal

Diosdado Macapagal was born on September 28, 1910, at Barrio San Nicolas in Lubao, Pampanga. He was the third of five children in a poor family. His father was Urbano Romero Macapagal, a poet who wrote in the local Kapampangan language, and his mother was Romana Pangan Macapagal, daughter of Atanacio Miguel Pangan (a former cabeza de barangay of Gutad, Floridablanca, Pampanga) and Lorenza Suing Antiveros. Urbano's mother, Escolástica Romero Macapagal, was a midwife and schoolteacher who taught catechism.

Diosdado is a distant descendant of Don Juan Macapagal, a prince of Tondo, who was a great-grandson of the last reigning lakan of Tondo, Lakandula. He is also related to well-to-do Licad family through his mother Romana, who was a second cousin of María Vitug Licad, grandmother of renowned pianist, Cecile Licad. Romana's own grandmother, Genoveva Miguel Pangan, and María's grandmother, Celestina Miguel Macaspac, were sisters. Their mother, María Concepción Lingad Miguel, was the daughter of José Pingul Lingad and Gregoria Malit Bartolo.

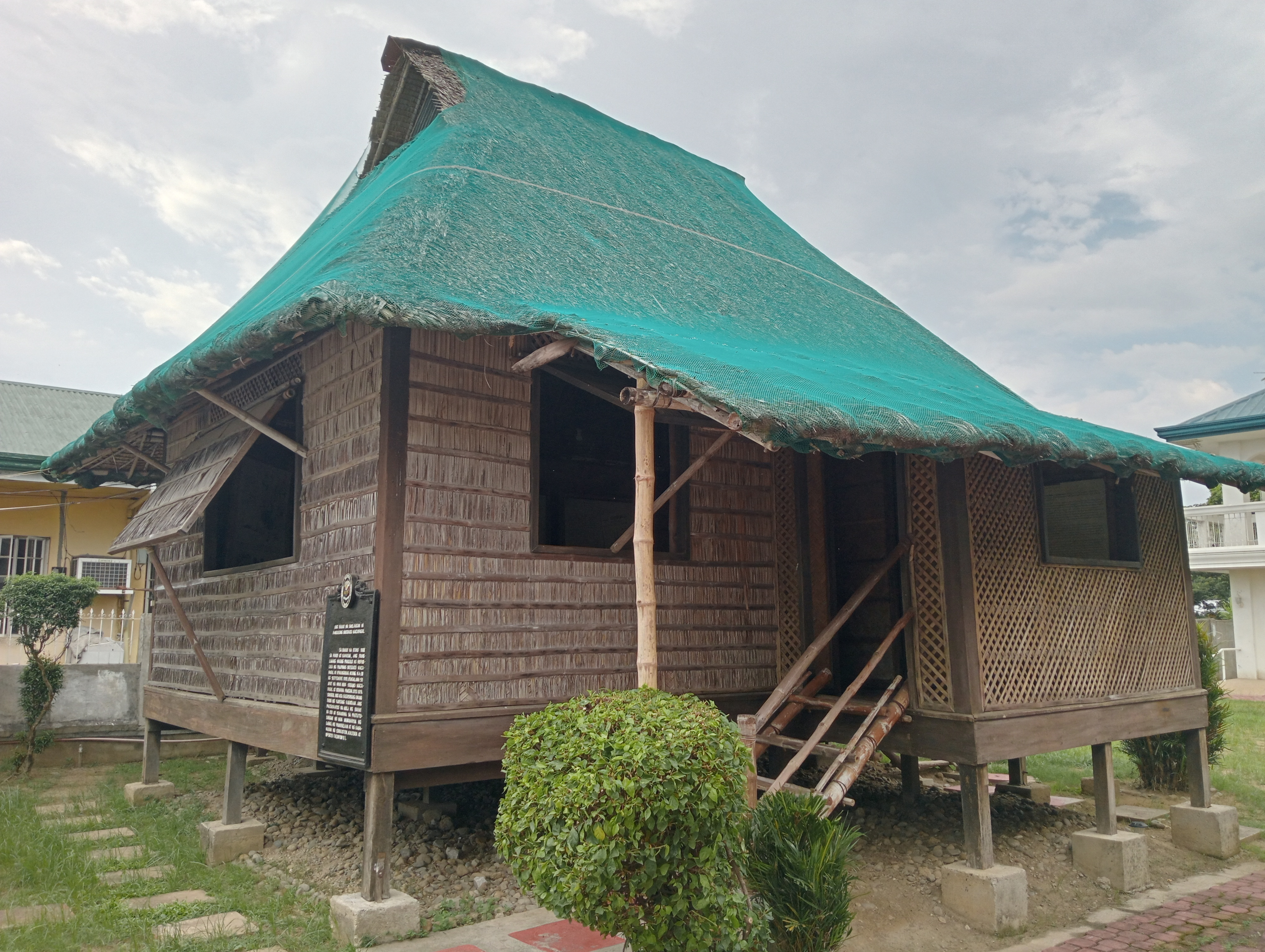
Diosdado Macapagal Birthplace House in Lubao, Pampanga, where Macapagal was born

Diosdado's family earned extra income by raising pigs and accommodating boarders in their home. Due to his roots in poverty, Macapagal would later become affectionately known as the "Poor Boy from Lubao". Diosdado was also a reputed poet in the Spanish language although his poetic work was eclipsed by his political career.

=== Early education ===
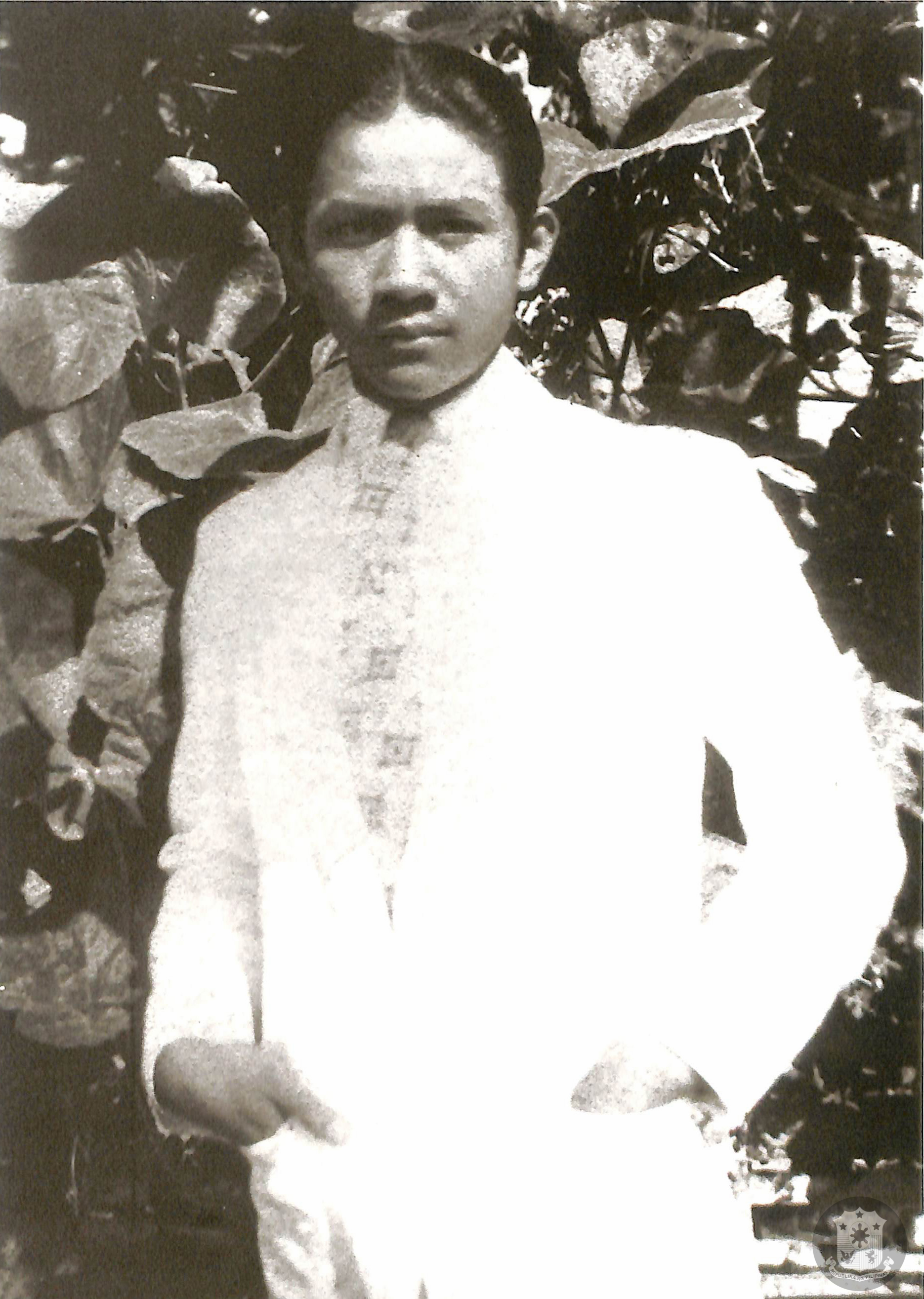
Macapagal in his younger years

Macapagal excelled in his studies at local public schools, graduating valedictorian from Lubao Elementary School, and salutatorian at Pampanga High School. He finished his pre-law course at the University of the Philippines Manila, then enrolled at Philippine Law School in 1932, studying on a scholarship and supporting himself with a part-time job as an accountant. While in law school, he gained prominence as an orator and debater. However, he was forced to quit schooling after two years due to poor health and a lack of money.

Returning to Pampanga, he joined boyhood friend Rogelio de la Rosa in producing and starring in Tagalog operettas patterned after classic Spanish zarzuelas. It was during this period that he married his friend's sister, Purita de la Rosa, in 1938. He had two children with de la Rosa, Cielo and Arturo.

Macapagal raised enough money to continue his studies at the University of Santo Tomas. He also gained the assistance of philanthropist Don Honorio Ventura, the secretary of the interior at the time, who financed his education. He also received financial support from his mother's relatives, notably from the Macaspacs, who owned large tracts of land in barrio Sta. Maria, Lubao, Pampanga. After receiving his Bachelor of Laws degree in 1936, he was admitted to the bar, topping the 1936 bar examination with a score of 89.95%. He later returned to his alma mater to take up graduate studies and earn a Master of Laws degree in 1941, a Doctor of Civil Law degree in 1947, and a PhD in economics in 1957. His dissertation had "Imperatives of Economic Development in the Philippines" as its title.

=== Early career ===
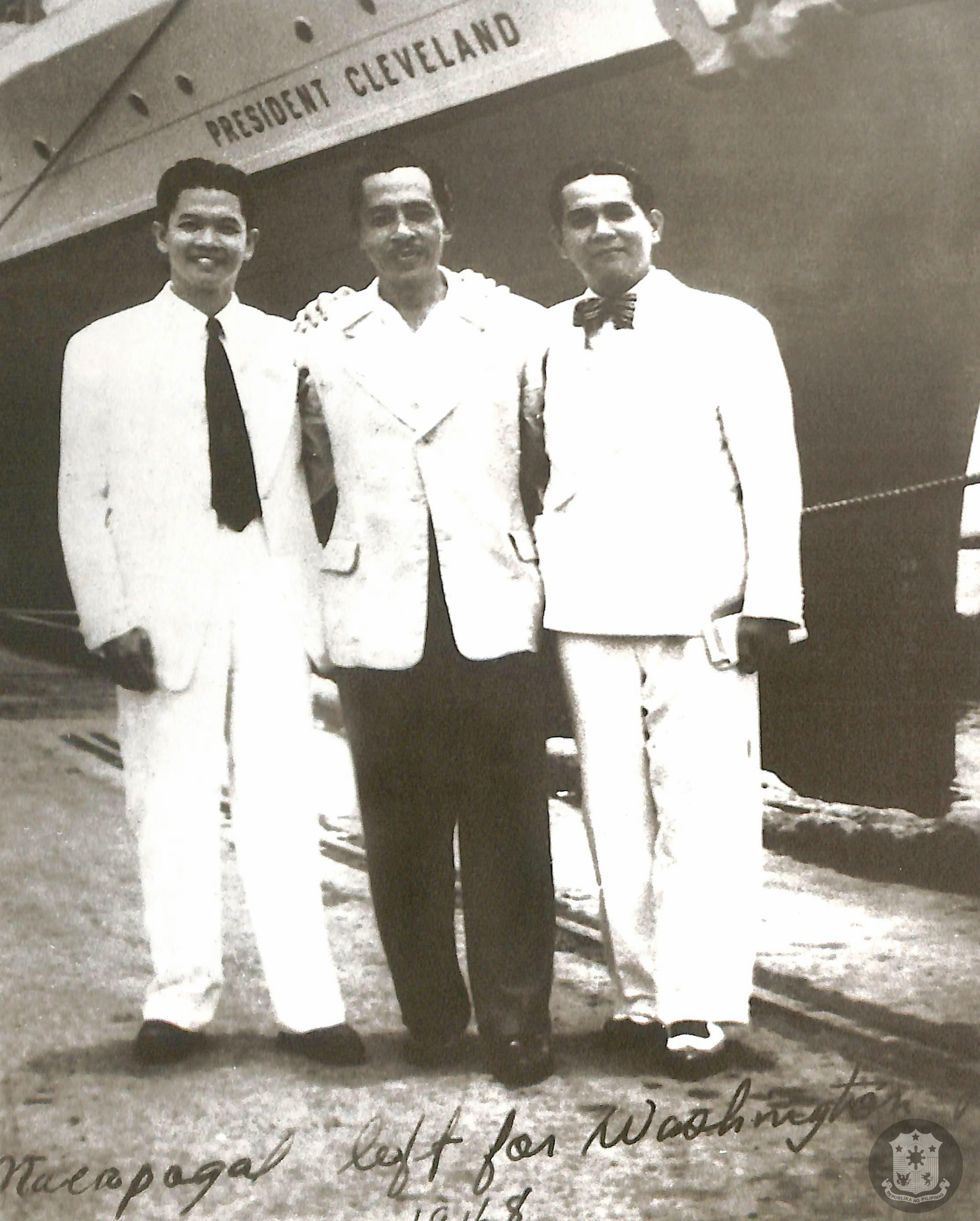
Macapagal (right) and Governor Jose B. Lingad (left), before Macapagal leaving to Washington in 1948.

After passing the bar examination, Macapagal was invited to join an American law firm as a practicing attorney, a particular honor for a Filipino at the time. He was assigned as a legal assistant to President Manuel L. Quezon in Malacañang Palace. During the Japanese occupation of the Philippines in World War II, Macapagal continued working in Malacañang Palace as an assistant to President José P. Laurel, while secretly aiding the anti-Japanese resistance during the Allied liberation country from the Japanese.

After the war, Macapagal worked as an assistant attorney with one of the largest law firms in the country, Ross, Lawrence, Selph and Carrascoso. With the establishment of the independent Third Republic of the Philippines in 1946, he rejoined government service when President Manuel Roxas appointed him to the Department of Foreign Affairs as the head of its legal division. In 1948, President Elpidio Quirino appointed Macapagal as chief negotiator in the successful transfer of the Turtle Islands in the Sulu Sea from the United Kingdom to the Philippines. That same year, he was assigned as second secretary to the Philippine Embassy in Washington, D.C. In 1949, he was elevated to the position of counselor on legal affairs and treaties, at the time the fourth-highest post in the Philippine Foreign Office.

== House of Representatives (1949–1957) ==
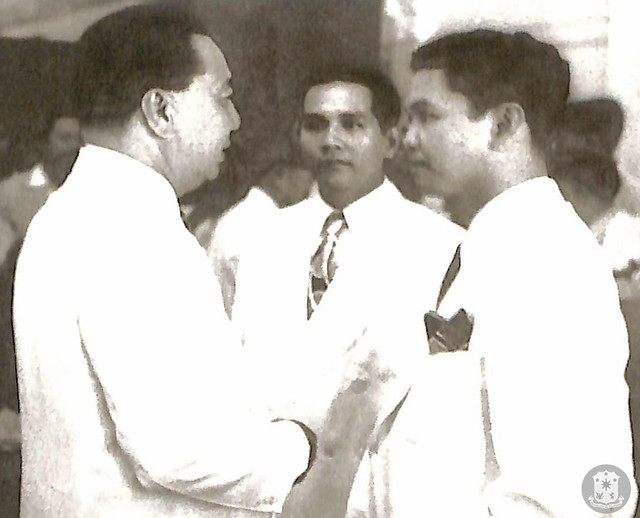
Macapagal (center) with Pampanga Governor Jose B. Lingad (right) and President Elpidio Quirino (left) in 1949

On the urging of local political leaders of Pampanga province, President Quirino recalled Macapagal from his position in Washington to run for a seat in the House of Representatives representing the 1st district of Pampanga. The district's incumbent, Representative Amado Yuzon, was a friend of Macapagal, but was opposed by the administration due to his support by communist groups. After a campaign that Macapagal described as cordial and free of personal attacks, he won a landslide victory in the 1949 election. He was re-elected in the 1953 election, and served as a representative in the 2nd and 3rd Congress.

At the start of the 1950 legislative session, the members of the House of Representatives elected Macapagal as chair of the Committee on Foreign Affairs, and was given several foreign assignments. He was a Philippine delegate to the United Nations General Assembly multiple times, taking part in debates over communist aggression with Andrei Vishinsky and Jacob Malik of the Soviet Union. He also took part in negotiations for the US–RP Mutual Defense Treaty, the Laurel–Langley Agreement, and the Japanese Peace Treaty. He authored the Foreign Service Act, which reorganized and strengthened the Philippine foreign service.

As a representative, Macapagal authored and sponsored several laws of socio-economic importance, particularly aimed at benefiting rural areas and the poor. Amongst the legislation that Macapagal promoted, was the Minimum Wage Law, Rural Health Law, Rural Bank Law, the Law on Barrio Councils, the Barrio Industrialization Law, and a law nationalizing the rice and corn industries. He was consistently selected by the Congressional Press Club as one of the Ten Outstanding Congressmen during his tenure. In his second term, he was named most outstanding lawmaker of the 3rd Congress.

In 1955, Macapagal ran for a Senate seat but lost and placed 9th.

== Vice presidency (1957–1961) ==
In the May 1957 general elections, the Liberal Party drafted Congressman Macapagal to run for vice president as the running-mate of José Yulo, a former speaker of the House of Representatives. Macapagal's nomination was particularly boosted by Liberal Party president Eugenio Pérez, who insisted that the party's vice presidential nominee have a clean record of integrity and honesty. While Yulo was defeated by Carlos P. Garcia of the Nacionalista Party, Macapagal was elected vice president in an upset victory, defeating the Nacionalista candidate, José Laurel, Jr., by over eight percentage points. A month after the election, he was chosen as the president of the Liberal Party.

As the first ever Philippine vice president to be elected from a rival party of the president, Macapagal served out his four-year vice presidential term as a leader of the opposition. The ruling party refused to give him a Cabinet position in the Garcia administration, which was a break from tradition. He was offered a position in the Cabinet only on the condition that he switch allegiance to the ruling Nationalista Party, but he declined the offer and instead played the role of critic to the administration's policies and performance. This allowed him to capitalize on the increasing unpopularity of the Garcia administration. Assigned to performing only ceremonial duties as vice president, he spent his time making frequent trips to the countryside to acquaint himself with voters and to promote the image of the Liberal Party.

== Presidency (1961–1965) ==
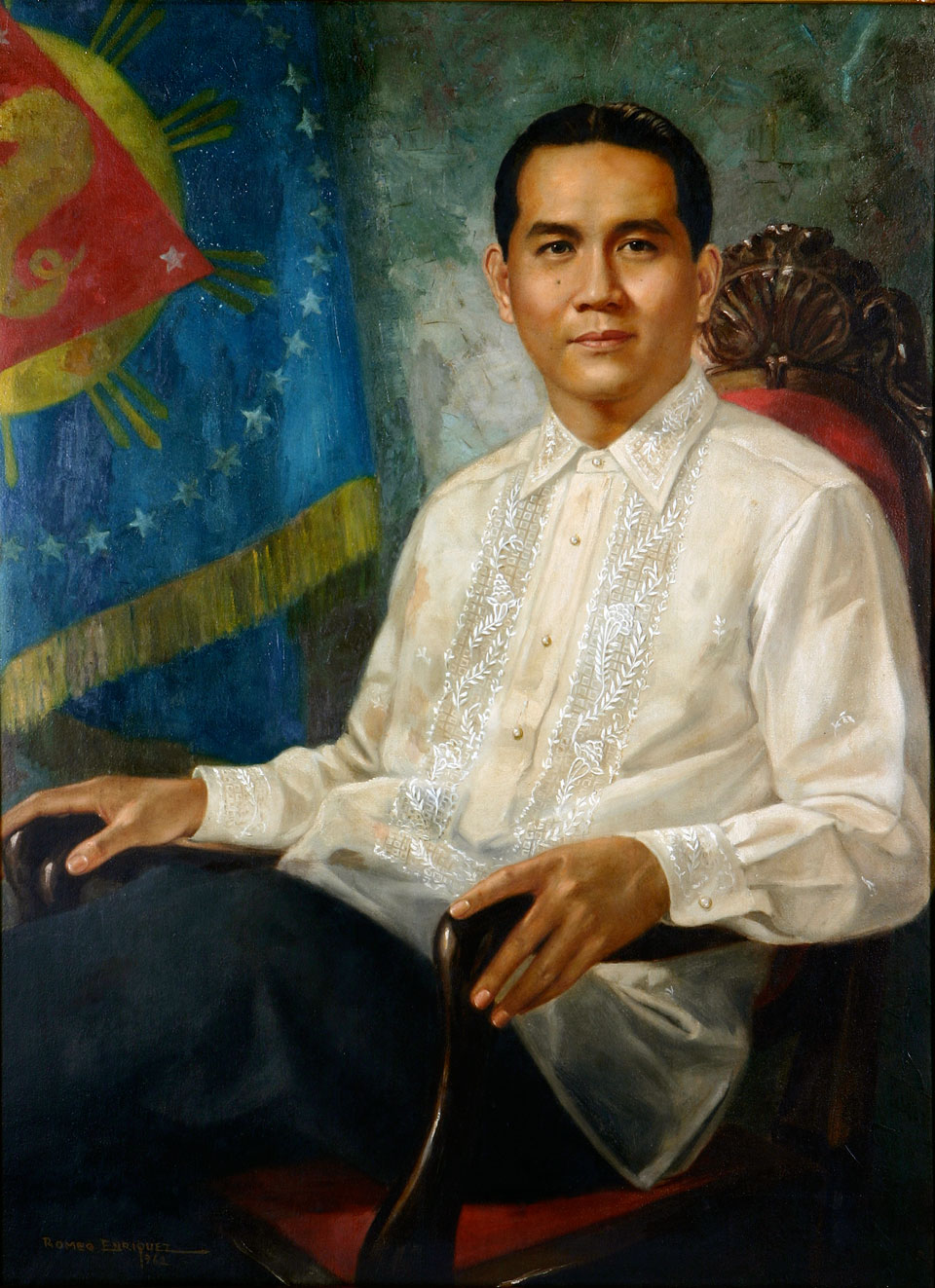
Official Malacañang Portrait by Romeo Enriquez

Presidential styles of Diosdado Macapagal
- Reference style: His Excellency
- Spoken style: Your Excellency
- Alternative style: Mr. President

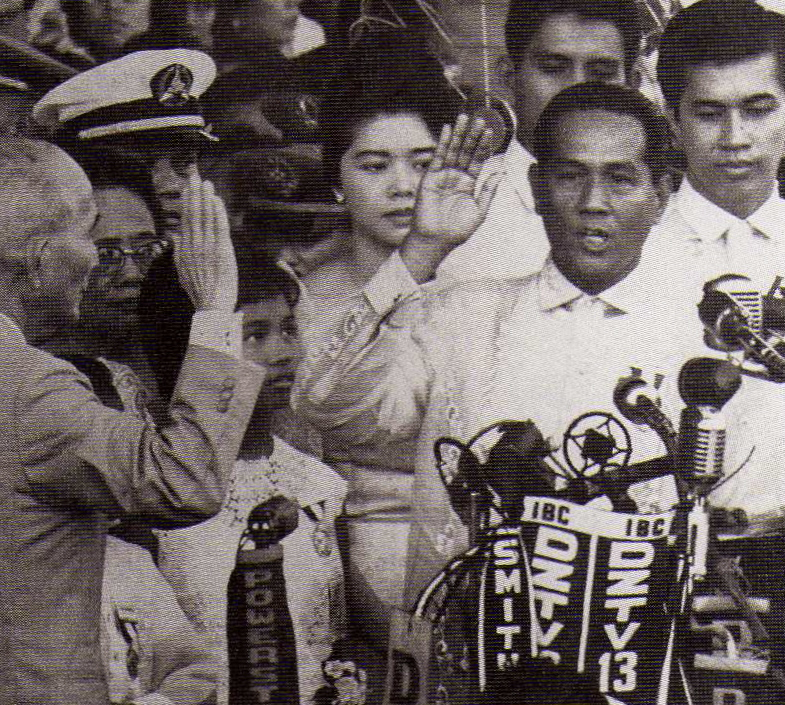
Macapagal swears in as President of the Philippines at the Quirino Grandstand, Manila on December 30, 1961

In the 1961 presidential election, Macapagal ran against Garcia's re-election bid, promising an end to corruption and appealing to the electorate as a common man from humble beginnings. He defeated the incumbent president by a 55% to 45% margin. His inauguration as the president of the Philippines took place on December 30, 1961. The Bible that Macapagal used was later used by his daughter Gloria when she took her oath as Vice President in 1998 and as President in 2004.

=== Major legislations signed ===
- Republic Act No. 3512 – An Act Creating A Fisheries Commission Defining Its Powers, Duties and Functions, and Appropriating Funds.
- Republic Act No. 3518 – An Act Creating The Philippine Veterans' Bank, and For Other Purposes.
- Republic Act No. 3844 – An Act To Ordain The Agricultural Land Reform Code and To Institute Land Reforms In The Philippines, Including The Abolition of Tenancy and The Channeling of Capital Into Industry, Provide For The Necessary Implementing Agencies, Appropriate Funds Therefor and For Other Purposes.
- Republic Act No. 4166 – An Act Changing The Date Of Philippine Independence Day From July Four To June Twelve, And Declaring July Four As Philippine Republic Day, Further Amending For The Purpose Section Twenty-Nine Of The Revised Administrative Code.
- Republic Act No. 4180 – An Act Amending Republic Act Numbered Six Hundred Two, Otherwise Known As The Minimum Wage Law, By Raising The Minimum Wage For Certain Workers, And For Other Purposes.

=== Domestic policies ===
Economy of the Philippines under President Diosdado Macapagal 1961–1965
Population
- 1961: $\approx$ 29.20 million

Gross Domestic Product (1985 constant prices)
- 1962: ▲ ₱234,828 million
- 1965: ▲ ₱273,769 million
- Growth rate, 1962–65: 5.5 %

Per capita income (1985 constant prices)
- 1962: ▲ ₱8,042
- 1965: ▲ ₱8,617

Total exports
- 1962: ▲ ₱46,177 million
- 1965: ▲ ₱66,216 million

Exchange rates
- 1 US$ = ₱3.80; 1 Ph₱ = US$0.26
- Sources: Philippine Presidency Project; Malaya, J. Eduardo; Malaya, Jonathan E. (2004). ...So Help Us God: The Presidents of the Philippines and Their Inaugural Addresses. Manila: Anvil Publishing.

==== Economy ====
In his inaugural address, Macapagal promised a socio-economic program anchored on "a return to free and private enterprise", placing economic development in the hands of private entrepreneurs with minimal interference.

Twenty days after the inauguration, exchange controls were lifted and the Philippine peso was allowed to float on the free currency exchange market. The currency controls were initially adopted by the administration of Elpidio Quirino as a temporary measure, but continued to be adopted by succeeding administrations. The peso devalued from ₱2.64 to the U.S. dollar, and stabilized at ₱3.80 to the dollar, supported by a US$300 million stabilization fund from the International Monetary Fund.

To achieve the national goal of economic and social progress with prosperity reaching down to the masses, Macapagal stated the essence of free enterprise declaring before Congress on January 22, 1962, that "the task of economic development belongs principally to private enterprise and not to the government.

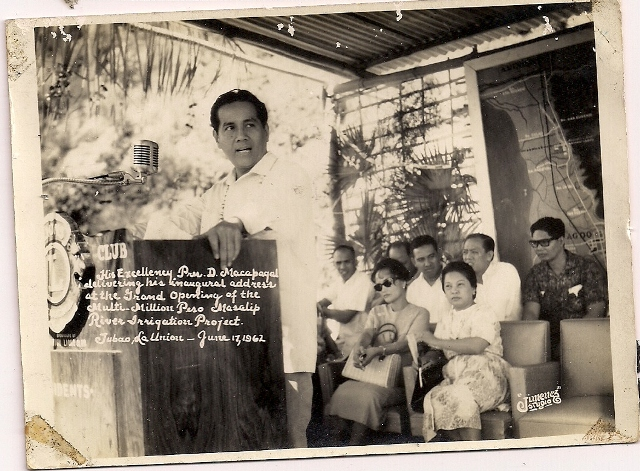
Macapagal inaugurating the Masalip Dam in Tubao, La Union in 1962

Before and after independence there was free enterprise in the Philippines under Presidents Manuel Quezon, Sergio Osmeña and Manuel Roxas. In 1950, President Quirino deviated from free enterprise launching as a temporary emergency measure the system of exchange and import controls. The controls system was carried out by President Magsaysay and Garcia.

The first fundamental decision Macapagal had to make was whether to continue the system of exchange controls of Quirino, Magsaysay and Garcia or to return to the free enterprise of Quezon, Osmena and Roxas. It had been his view since he was a congressman for eight years that the suitable economic system for Filipinos was free enterprise. And on January 21, 1962, Macapagal signed a Central Bank decree abolishing exchange controls and returning to free enterprise.

During the 20 days deciding between controls and free enterprise after his inauguration as president and before the opening of Congress, Macapagal's main adviser was Andres Castillo, governor of the Central Bank.

Further reform efforts by Macapagal were blocked by the Nacionalistas, who dominated the House of Representatives and the Senate at that time. Nonetheless, Macapagal was able to achieve steady economic progress, and annual GDP growth averaged at 5.53% for 1962–65.

==== Socio-economic program ====
In June 1962, President Macapagal established the Emergency Employment Administration (EEA), to be headed by the president, in order to address the issue of unemployment.

The removal of controls and the restoration of free enterprise was intended to provide only the fundamental setting in which Macapagal could work out economic and social progress. A specific and periodic program for the guidance of both the private sector and the government was an essential instrument to attain the economic and social development that constituted his goals.

Such a program for his administration was formulated under his authority and direction by a group of reputable economic and business leaders, the most active and effective of which was Sixto Roxas III. From an examination of the planned targets and requirements of the Five-Year program – formally known as the Five-Year Socio-Economic Integrated Development Program – it could be seen that it aimed at the following objectives.

- immediate restoration of economic stability;
- alleviating the plight of the common man; and
- establishing a dynamic basic for future growth.

Free enterprise was restored with decontrol. The Five-Year Economic Program had been prescribed. Land reform abolishing tenancy had been launched. These were essential foundations for economic and social progress.

With the essential foundations laid, attention must then be turned to the equally difficult task of building the main edifice by implementing the economic program.

Such role of the government in free enterprise, in the view of Macapagal, required it;

(1) Provide the social overhead like roads, airfields and ports that directly or proximately promote economic growth,

(2) Adopt fiscal and monetary policies salutary to investments, and

(3) Serve as an entrepreneur or promote of basic and key private industries, particularly those that require capital too large for businessmen to put up by themselves.

Among the enterprises he selected for active government promotion were integrated steel, fertilizer, pulp, meat canning and tourism.

==== Land reform ====
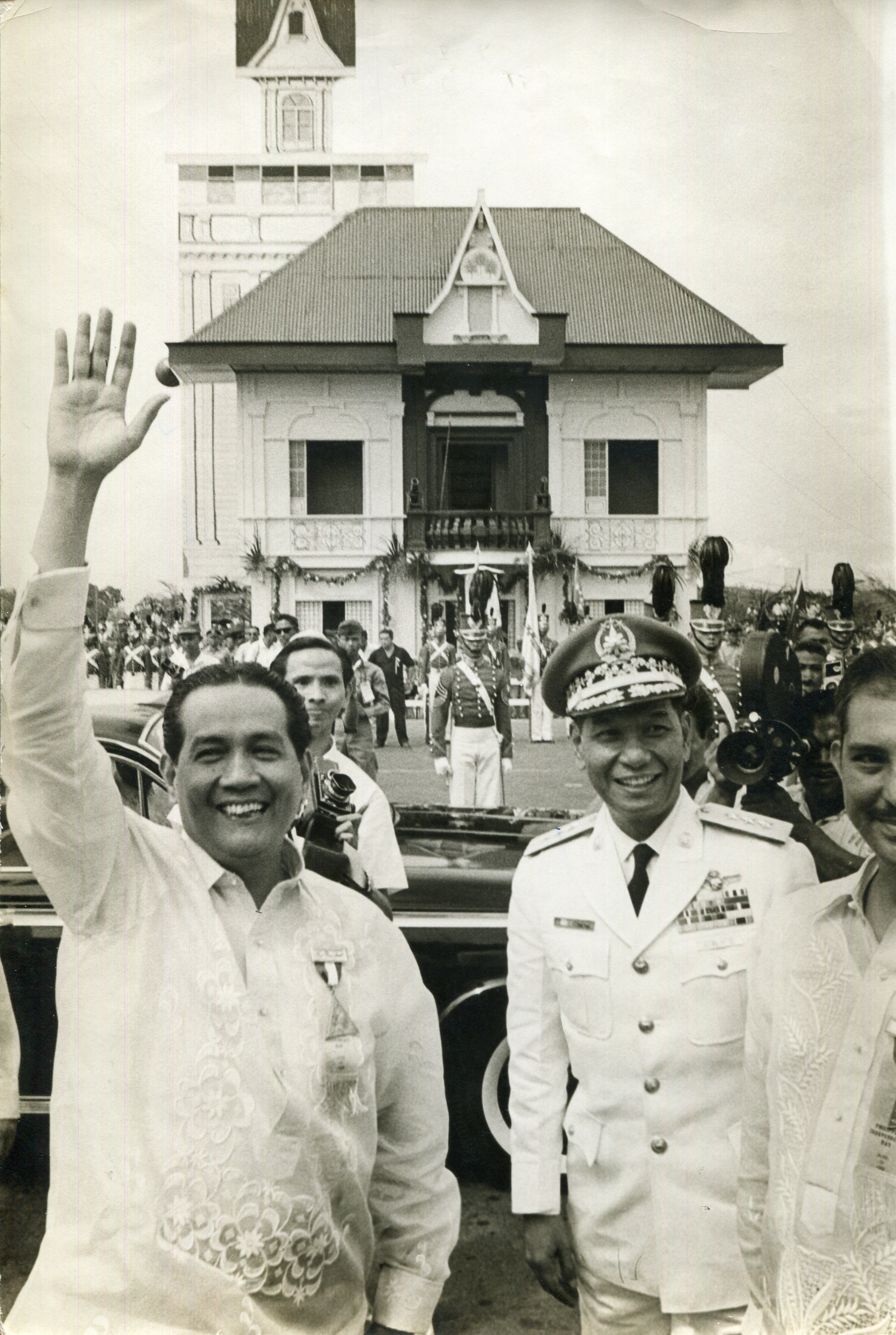
Macapagal (left) in front of the Aguinaldo house replica at the Quirino Grandstand, June 12, 1962

Like Ramon Magsaysay, President Diosdado Macapagal came from the masses. He savored calling himself the "Poor boy from Lubao". Ironically, he had little popularity among the masses. This could be attributed to an absence of any charismatic appeal owing to his stiff personality. But despite this, Macapagal had certain achievements. Foremost of these was the Agricultural Land Reform Code of 1963 (Republic Act No. 3844) which provided for the purchase of private farmlands with the intention of distributing them in small lots to the landless tenants on easy terms of payment. It is a major development of land reform in the Philippines,

In comparison with previous agrarian legislation, the law lowered the retention limit to 75 ha (190 acres), whether owned by individuals or corporations. It removed the term "contiguous" and established the leasehold system. The share-tenancy or the kasama system was prohibited. It formulated a bill of rights that assured agricultural workers the right to self-organization and to a minimum wage. It also created an office that acquired and distributed farmlands and a financing institution for this purpose. The major flaw of this law was, however, that it had several exemptions, such as ort (big capital plantations established during the Spanish and American periods); fishponds, saltbeds, and lands primarily planted to citrus, coconuts, cacao, coffee, durian, and other similar permanent trees; landholdings converted to residential, commercial, industrial, or other similar non-agricultural purposes.

It was viewed that the 75-hectare retention limit was just too high for the growing population density. Moreover, this law merely allowed the transfer of the landlordism from one area to another. This was because landlords were paid in bonds, which they could use to purchase agricultural lands. Likewise, the farmer was free to choose to be excluded from leasehold arrangements if he volunteered to give up the landholdings to the landlord.

Within two years after the law was implemented, no land was being purchased under its terms and conditions caused by the peasants' inability to purchase the land. Besides, the government seemed lacking of strong political will, as shown by the Congress' allotment of only one million Philippine pesos for the implementation of this code. At least ₱200 million was needed within a year from the enactment and implementation of the code, and ₱300 million in the next three years for the program to be successful. However, by 1972, the code had benefited only 4,500 peasants covering 68 estates, at the cost of ₱57 million to the government. Consequently, by the 1970s, farmers ended up tilling less land, with their share in the farm also being less. They incurred more debts, depending on the landlord, creditors, and palay buyers. Indeed, during the administration of Macapagal, the productivity of the farmers further declined.

==== Anti-corruption drive ====
One of Macapagal's major campaign pledges had been to clean out the government corruption that had proliferated under former President Garcia. Early on in his presidency, Macapagal honored several individuals who returned lost wallets and checks to emphasize the virtue of honesty. He also publicized the assets, liabilities, and net worths of his cabinet officials to demonstrate his administration's transparency efforts; while government officials are required to submit statements of assets and liabilities, no law at the time necessitated them to be publicized.

The administration also openly feuded with Filipino businessmen Fernando Lopez and Eugenio Lopez, Sr., brothers who had controlling interests in several large businesses. The administration alluded to the brothers as "Filipino Stonehills who build and maintain business empires through political power, including the corruption of politicians and other officials". In the 1965 election, the Lopezes threw their support behind Macapagal's rival, Ferdinand Marcos, with Fernando Lopez serving Marcos' running mate.

==== Stonehill controversy ====
The Administration's campaign against corruption was tested by Harry Stonehill, an American expatriate with a $50-million business empire in the Philippines. Macapagal's secretary of justice, Jose W. Diokno investigated Stonehill on charges of tax evasion, smuggling, misdeclaration of imports, and corruption of public officials. Diokno's investigation revealed Stonehill's ties to corruption within the government. Macapagal, however, prevented Diokno from prosecuting Stonehill by deporting the American instead, then dismissing Diokno from the cabinet. Diokno questioned Macapagal's actions, saying, "How can the government now prosecute the corrupted when it has allowed the corrupter to go?" Diokno later served as a senator.

==== Independence Day ====
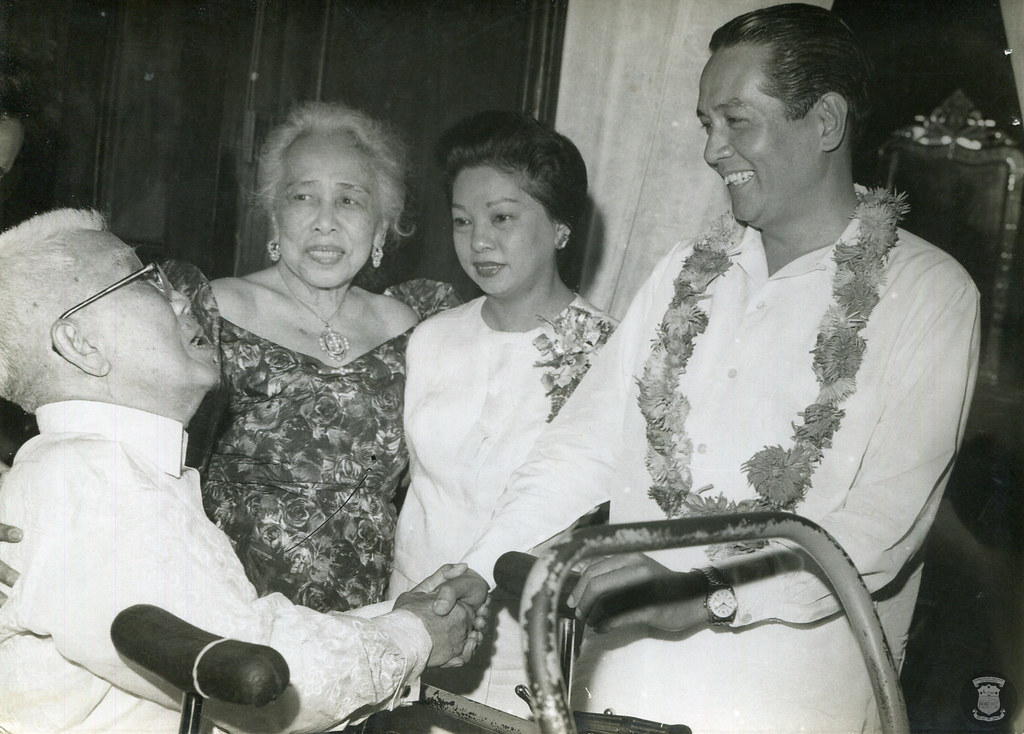
Macapagal (right) shaking hands with former President Emilio Aguinaldo (left)

Macapagal appealed to nationalist sentiments by shifting the commemoration of Philippine independence day. On May 12, 1962, he signed a proclamation which declared Tuesday, June 12, 1962, as a special public holiday in commemoration of the declaration of independence from Spain on that date in 1898. The change became permanent in 1964 with the signing of Republic Act No. 4166. For having issued his 1962 proclamation, Macapagal is generally credited with having moved the celebration date of the Independence Day holiday. Years later, Macapagal told journalist Stanley Karnow the real reason for the change: "When I was in the diplomatic corps, I noticed that nobody came to our receptions on the Fourth of July, but went to the American Embassy instead. So, to compete, I decided we needed a different holiday."

American historian Joseph Scalice alternatively argued that Macapagal's decision to move Independence Day from July 4 to June 12 stemmed from the souring of relations with the United States. On July 29, 1961, Carlos P. Garcia authorized the importation of 4.5 million kilos of US Virginia tobacco. On December 23, 1961, the Philippine Supreme Court ruled against a suit by local Virginia tobacco growers that prayed for the blocking of the importation. However, after becoming president, Macapagal declared the importation illegal and instructed the Bureau of Customs to destroy the US tobacco shipments impounded in the docks of Manila.

US House Committee on Agriculture Chair Harold D. Cooley threatened to block a bill remunerating $72 million worth of war damages to the Philippines if the tobacco cannot be imported. Macapagal offered a compromise in which every kilo of imported US tobacco would be exchanged for four kilos of exported Philippine tobacco. Despite the Philippine Supreme Court overturning Macapagal's order and directing that the tobacco be allowed entry to the country, the war damages bill was terminated by the US House of Representatives on May 9, 1962.

Together with the Stonehill scandal, the Americans' refusal to pay war damages led to Macapagal canceling a state visit to the US. In 1962, he instead met with Francisco Franco in Spain, where Macapagal delivered a speech about the Philippines having "historic ties" with its "mother country".

=== Foreign policies ===
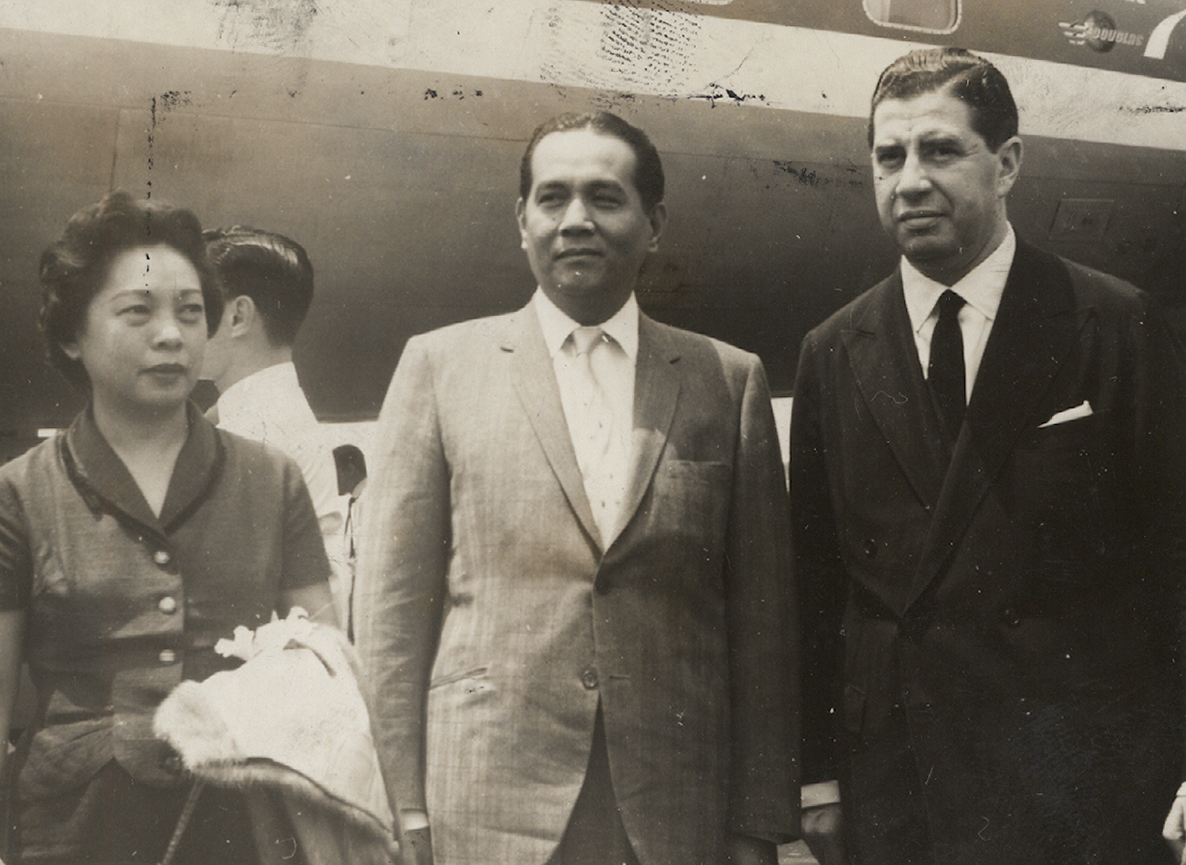
Macapagal (center) during a visit in Brazil in 1960

==== North Borneo claim ====
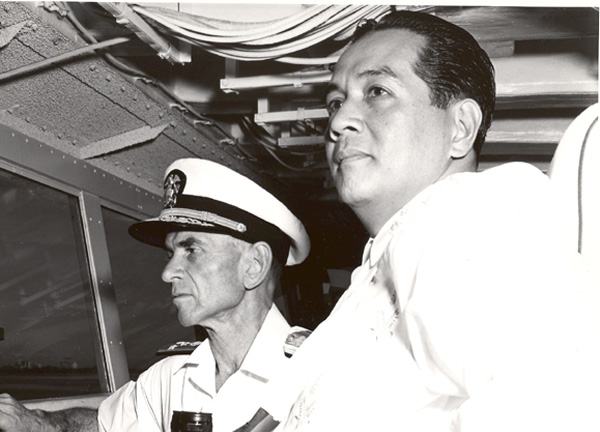
President Diosdado Macapagal on the bridge of the USS Oklahoma City in 1962

On September 12, 1962, during Macapagal's administration, the territory of eastern North Borneo (now Sabah), and the full sovereignty, title and dominion over the territory were ceded by heirs of the Sultanate of Sulu, Sultan Muhammad Esmail E. Kiram I, to the Republic of the Philippines. The cession effectively gave the Philippine government the full authority to pursue their claim in international courts. The Philippines broke diplomatic relations with Malaysia after the federation had included Sabah in 1963. It was revoked in 1989 because succeeding Philippine administrations have placed the claim in the back burner in the interest of pursuing cordial economic and security relations with Kuala Lumpur. To date, Malaysia continues to consistently reject Philippine calls to resolve the matter of Sabah's jurisdiction to the International Court of Justice. Malaysia saw the claim made by the Philippines' Moro leader Nur Misuari to take the Sabah case to the International Court of Justice (ICJ) as a non-issue and thus dismissed the claim.

==== MAPHILINDO ====
In July 1963, President Macapagal convened a summit meeting in Manila in which a nonpolitical confederation for Malaysia, the Philippines, and Indonesia, Maphilindo, was proposed as a realization of José Rizal's vision of bringing together the Malay peoples, who he saw was artificially divided by colonial frontiers.

Maphilindo was described as a regional association that would approach issues of common concern in the spirit of consensus. However, it was also perceived as a tactic on the parts of Jakarta and Manila to delay, or even prevent, the formation of the Federation of Malaysia. Manila had its own claim to Sabah (formerly British North Borneo), and Jakarta protested the formation of Malaysia as a British imperialist plot. The plan failed when Sukarno adopted his plan of "konfrontasi" with Malaysia. The Konfrontasi, or Confrontation basically aimed at preventing Malaysia from attaining independence. The idea was inspired onto President Sukarno by the Partai Komunis Indonesia (PKI). The party convinced President Sukarno that the formation of Malaysia is a form of neo-colonization and would affect tranquility in Indonesia. The subsequent development of ASEAN almost certainly excludes any possibility of the project ever being revived.

==== Vietnam War ====
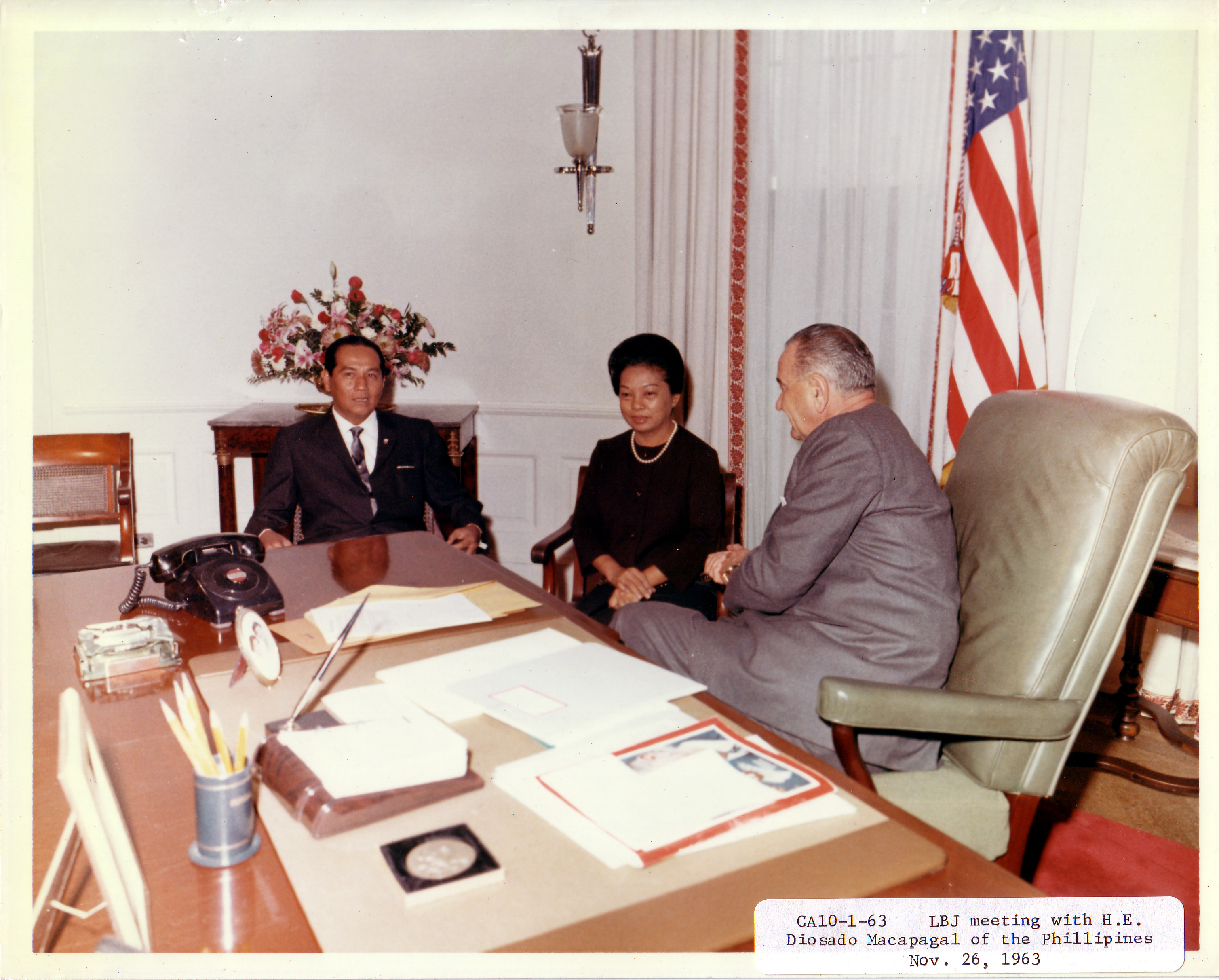
US President Lyndon B. Johnson (right) with Macapagal (left) in 1963

Before the end of his term in 1965, Macapagal persuaded Congress to send troops to South Vietnam. However this proposal was blocked by the opposition led by Senate President Ferdinand Marcos who deserted Macapagal's Liberal Party and defected to the Nacionalista Party.

The US government's active interest in bringing other nations into the war had been part of US policy discussions as early as 1961. President Lyndon Johnson first publicly appealed for other countries to come to the aid of South Vietnam on April 23, 1964–in what was called the "More Flags" program. Chester Cooper, former director of Asian affairs for the White House, explained why the impetus came from the United States instead of from the Republic of South Vietnam: "The 'More Flags' campaign ... required the application of considerable pressure for Washington to elicit any meaningful commitments. One of the more exasperating aspects of the search…was the lassitude …... of the Saigon government. In part ... the South Vietnam leaders were preoccupied with political jockeying. ... In addition, Saigon appeared to believe that the program was a public relations campaign directed at the American people."

=== 1963 midterm election ===
The senatorial election was held on November 12, 1963. Macapagal's Liberal Party (LP) won four out of the eight seats up for grabs during the election – thereby increasing the LP's Senate seats from eight to ten.

=== 1965 presidential campaign ===
Towards the end of his term, Macapagal decided to seek re-election to continue seeking reforms which he claimed were stifled by a "dominant and uncooperative opposition" in Congress. With Senate President Ferdinand Marcos, a fellow member of the Liberal Party, unable to win his party's nomination due to Macapagal's re-election bid, Marcos switched allegiance to the rival Nacionalista Party to oppose Macapagal.

Among the issues raised against the incumbent administration were graft and corruption, rise in consumer goods, and persisting peace and order issues. Macapagal was defeated by Marcos in the November 1965 polls.

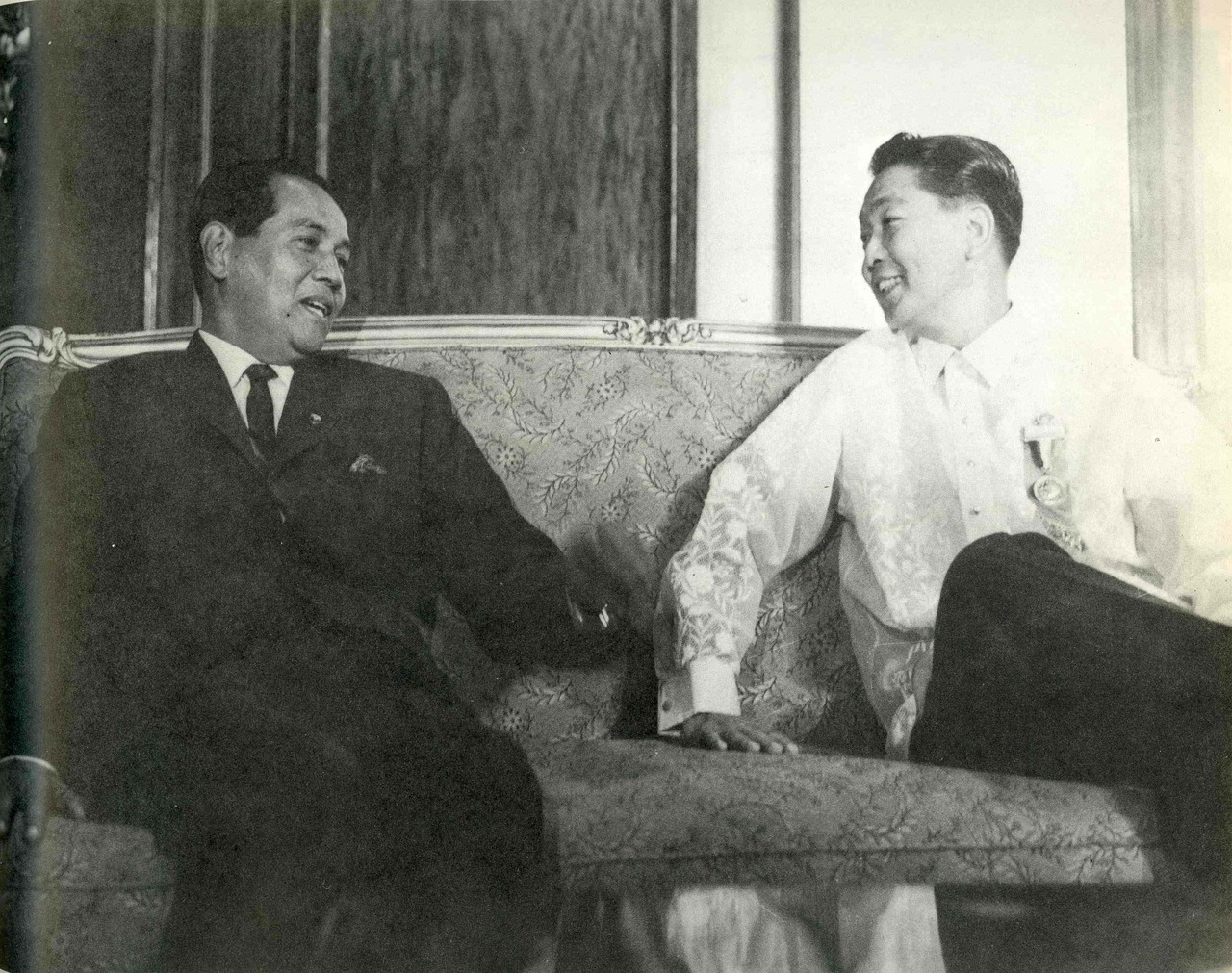
President-elect Ferdinand E. Marcos is received by incumbent President Diosdado Macapagal at the Malacañan Palace Music Room, before both proceeded to the inaugural venue, December 30, 1965.

== Post-presidency and death (1965–1997) ==
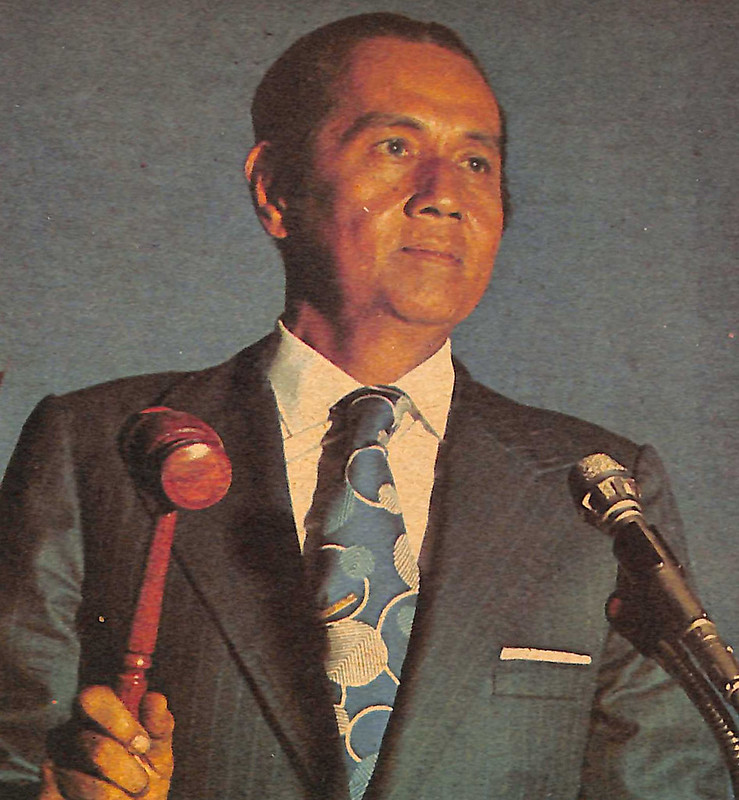
Macapagal as President of the Philippine Constitutional Convention of 1971

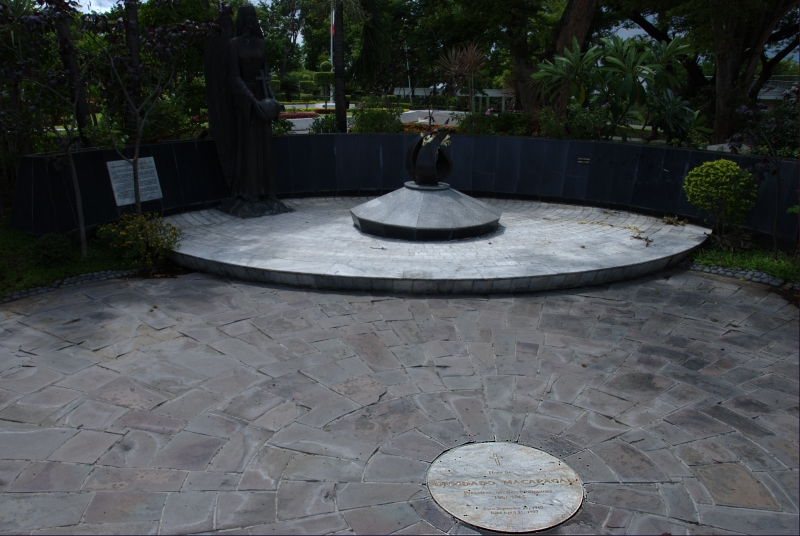
Grave of Diosdado Macapagal at the Libingan ng mga Bayani.

Macapagal announced his retirement from politics following his 1965 loss to Marcos. In 1971, he was elected president of the constitutional convention that drafted what became the 1973 Constitution. The manner in which the charter was ratified and later modified led him to later question its legitimacy. In 1979, he formed the National Union for Liberation as a political party to oppose the Marcos regime.

Following the restoration of democracy in 1986, Macapagal took on the role of elder statesman, and was a member of the Philippine Council of State. He also served as honorary chairman of the National Centennial Commission, and chairman of the board of CAP Life, among others.

In his retirement, Macapagal devoted much of his time to reading and writing. He published his presidential memoir, authored several books about government and economics, and wrote a weekly column for the Manila Bulletin newspaper.

Diosdado Macapagal died of heart failure, pneumonia and renal complications at the Makati Medical Center on April 21, 1997. He was accorded a state funeral and was interred at the Libingan ng mga Bayani on April 27, 1997.

== Personal life ==
=== First marriage ===
In 1938, Macapagal married Purita de la Rosa. They had two children, Cielo Macapagal-Salgado (who would later become vice governor of Pampanga) and Arturo Macapagal. Purita died in 1943. His first grandchild, Ria Macapagal-Salgado, was born in 1961 to Cielo and Gene Salgado.

=== Second marriage ===
On May 5, 1946, Macapagal married Eva Macapagal, with whom he had two children, Gloria Macapagal Arroyo (who would later become president of the Philippines) and Diosdado Macapagal, Jr.

=== Faith ===
Macapagal was a regular attendee of the Good Friday procession in his hometown of Lubao, Pampanga. He was also a regular participant in the annual silent retreat at the Sunnyside Villa of the Society of the Divine Word in Baguio beginning in 1954 and continuing into his presidency in the 1960s.

== Legacy ==
On September 28, 2009, Macapagal's daughter, President Gloria Macapagal Arroyo, inaugurated the President Diosdado Macapagal Museum and Library, located at his home town of Lubao, Pampanga.

President Benigno S. Aquino III declared September 28, 2010, as a special non-working holiday in Macapagal's home province of Pampanga to commemorate the centennial of his birth.

He is featured in the 200-peso note of the New Design Series (June 12, 2002 – 2013) and New Generation Currency (December 16, 2010–present).

Several structures were named after Macapagal, including Diosdado Macapagal Boulevard and Macapagal Bridge.

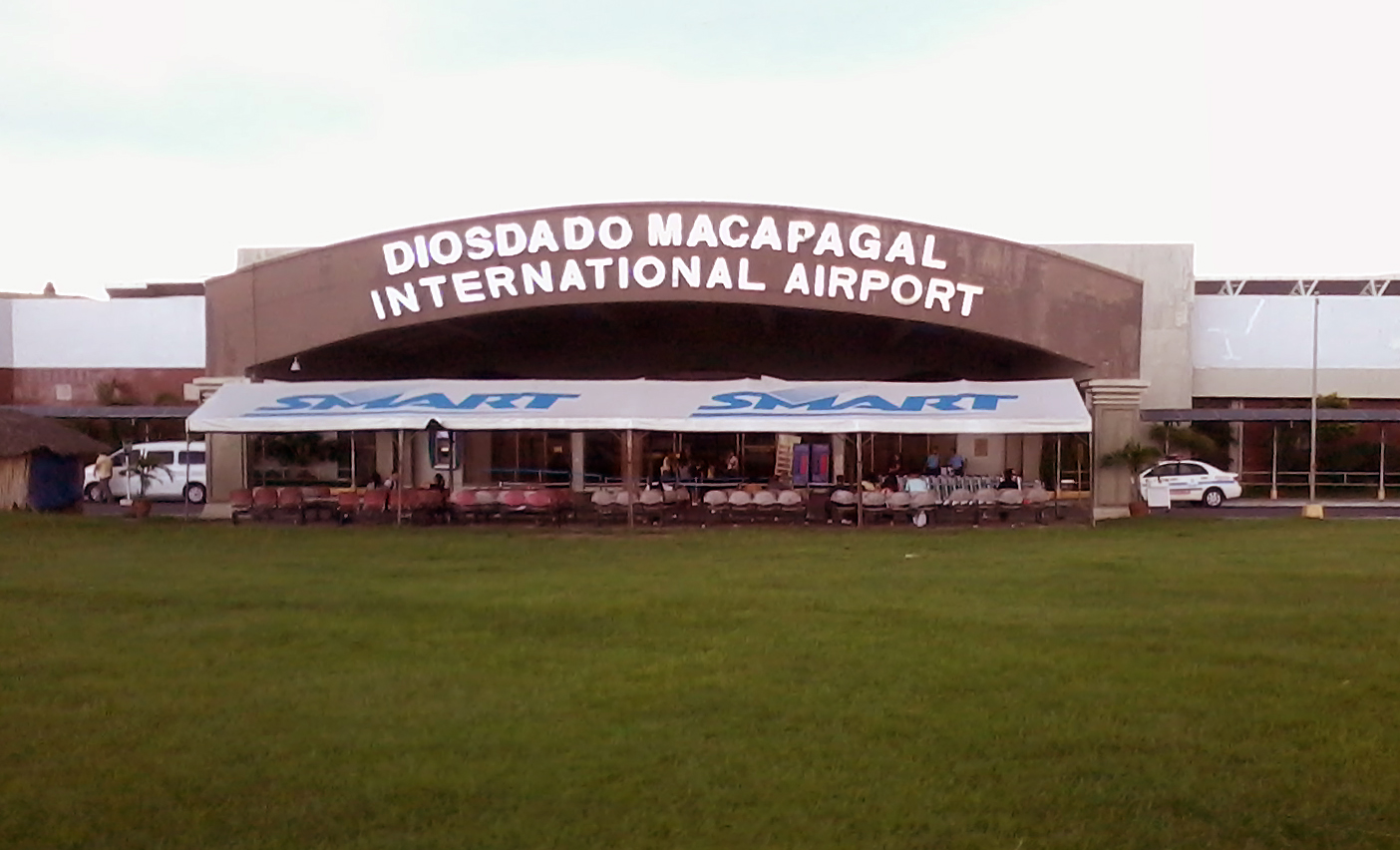
Diosdado Macapagal International Airport in Clark, Pampanga

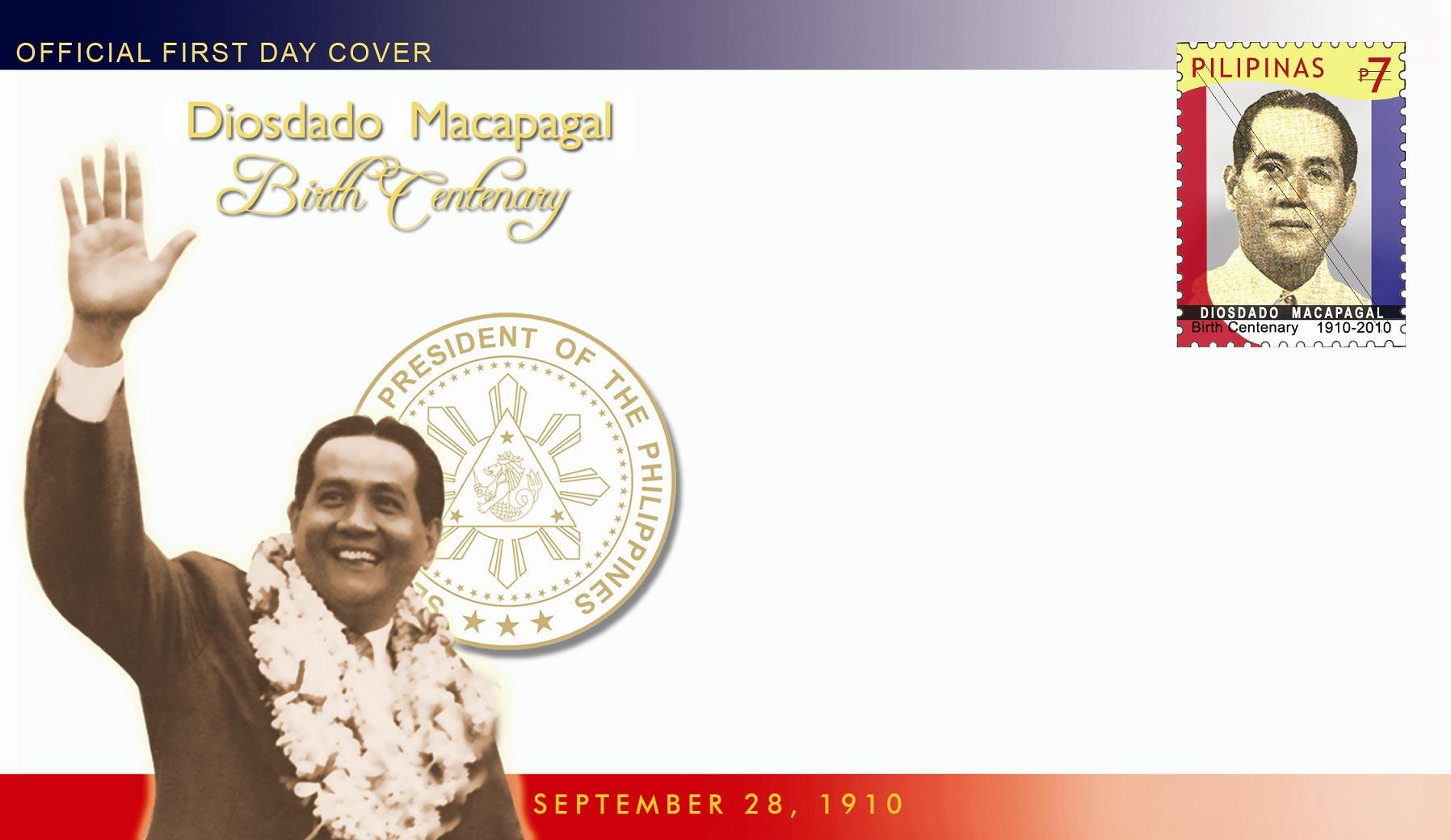
Diosdado Macapagal 2010 stamp of the Philippines

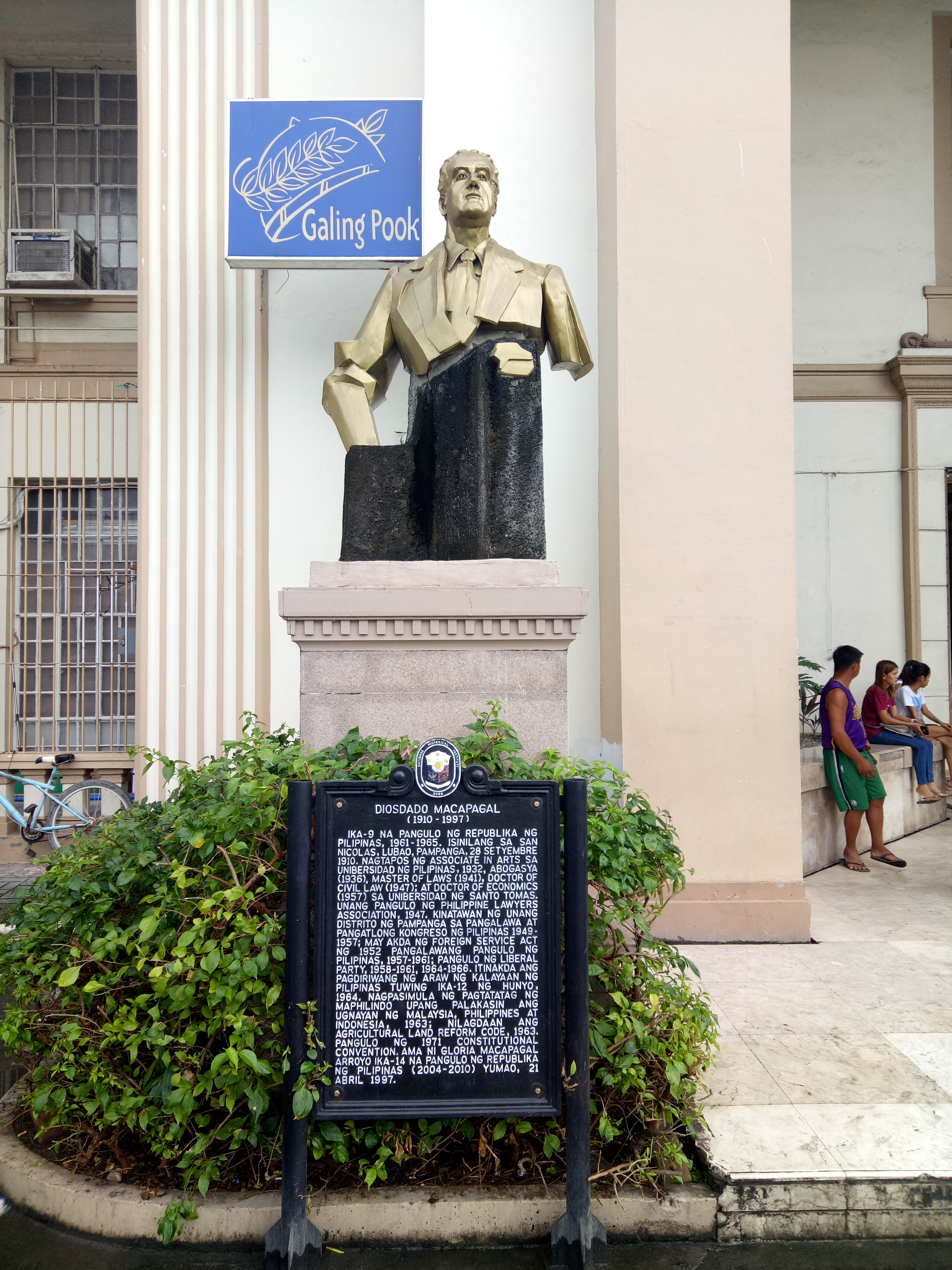
Macapagal monument in Pampanga Capitol

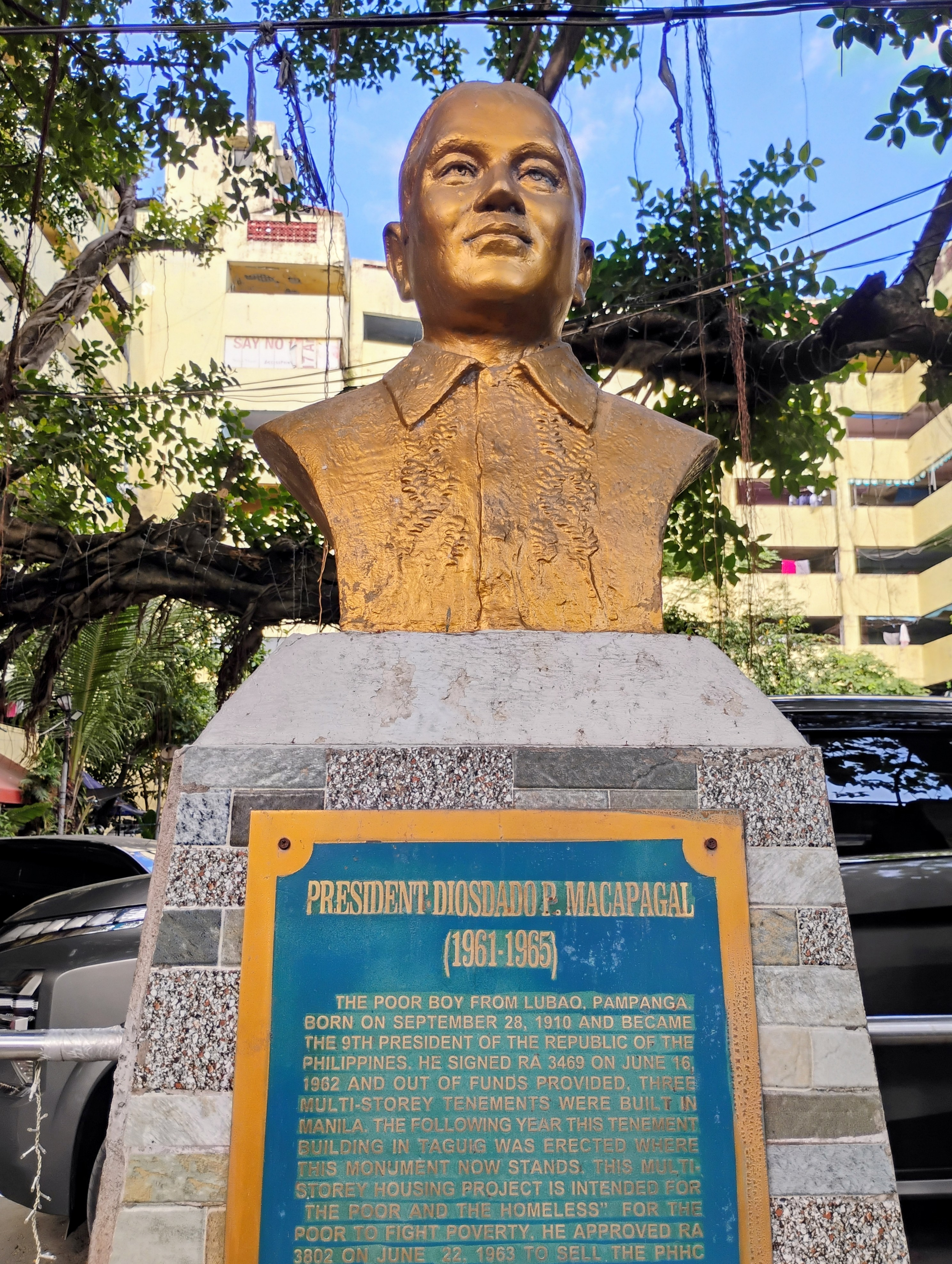
Mcapagal bust at Tenement, Taguig

=== Museum and library ===
These house the personal books and memorabilia of Macapagal.

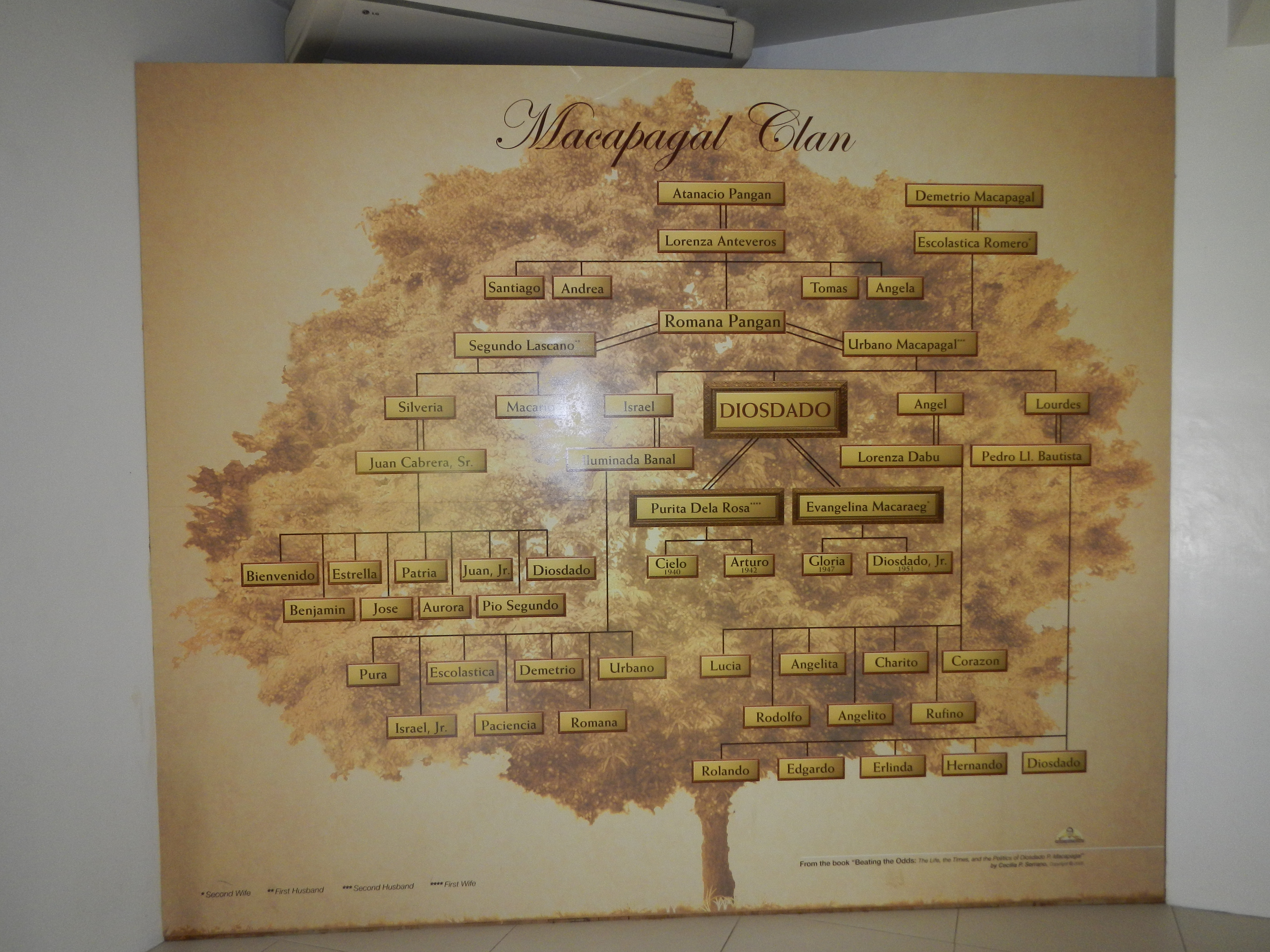
Macapagal Clan

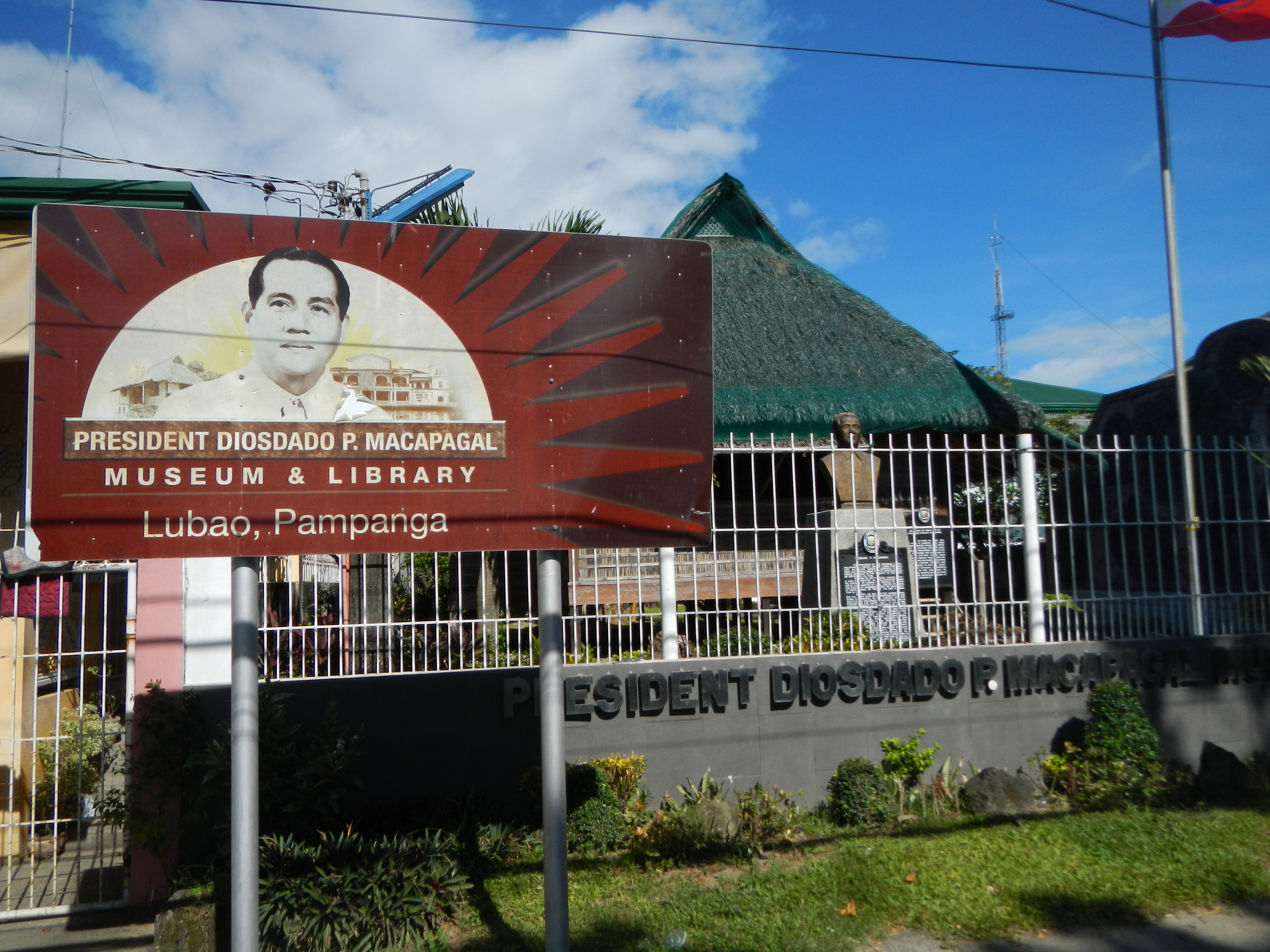
Façade of the House

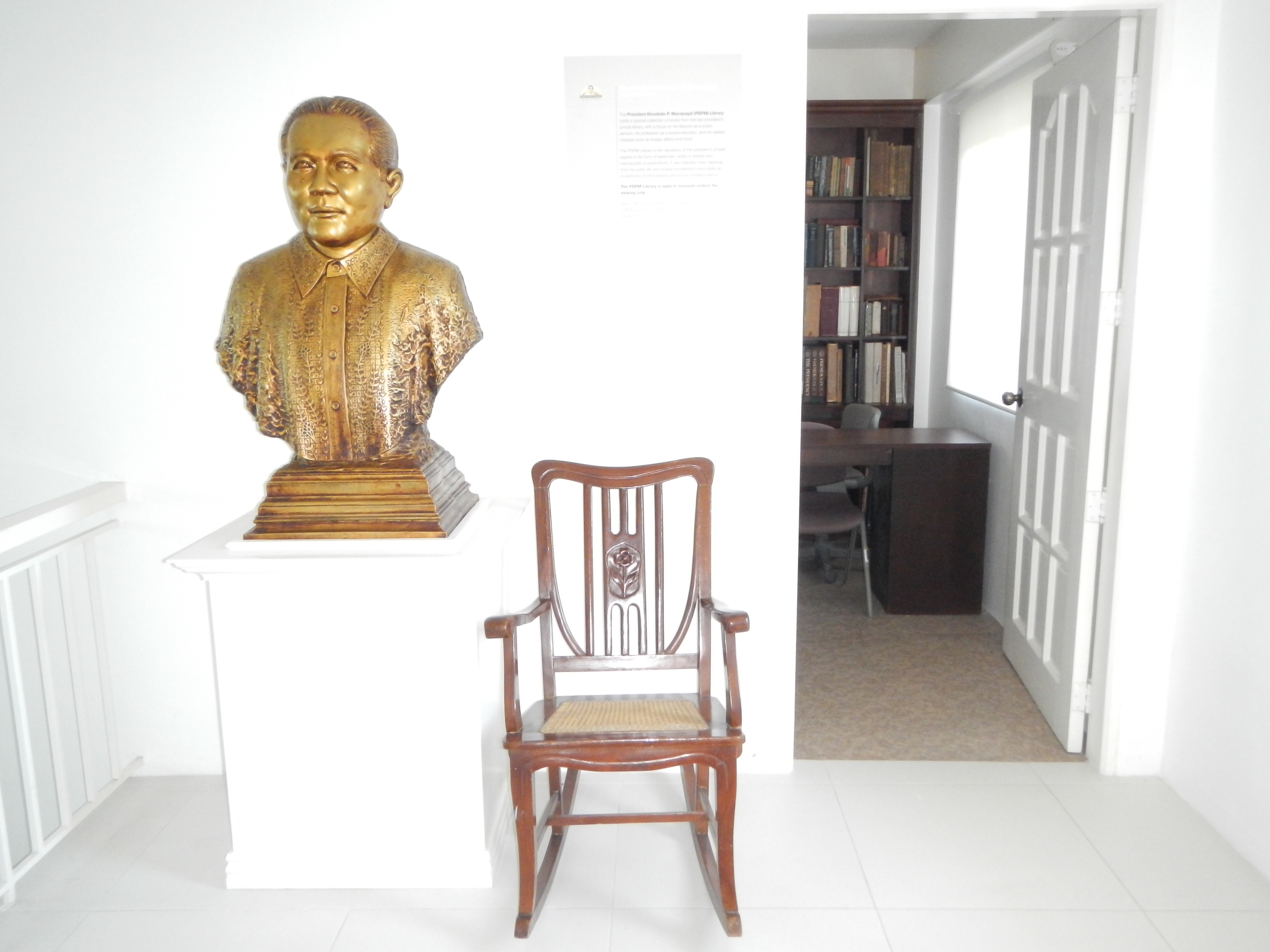
Bust (sculpture) of Macapagal in museum-library

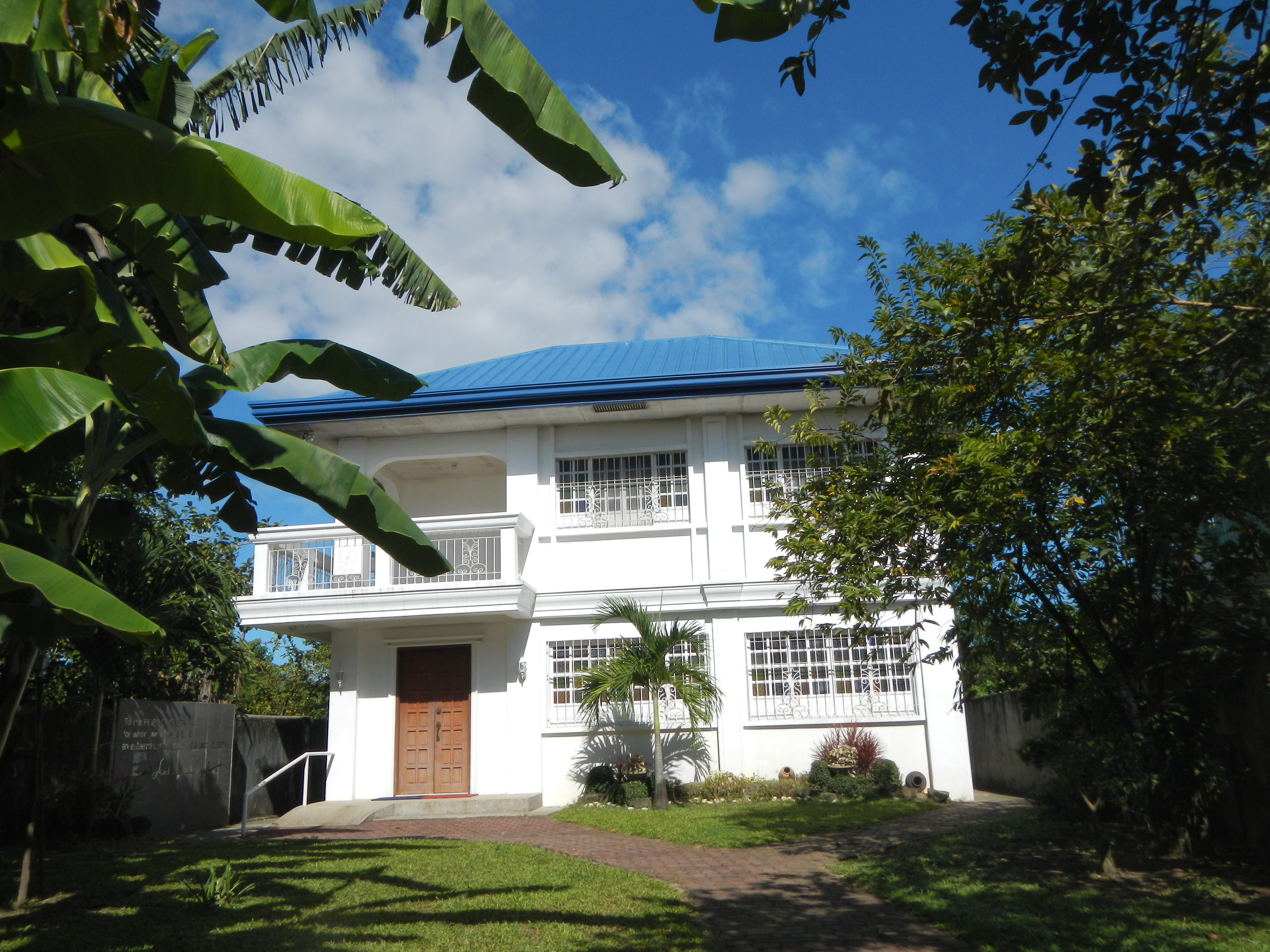
Museum and library

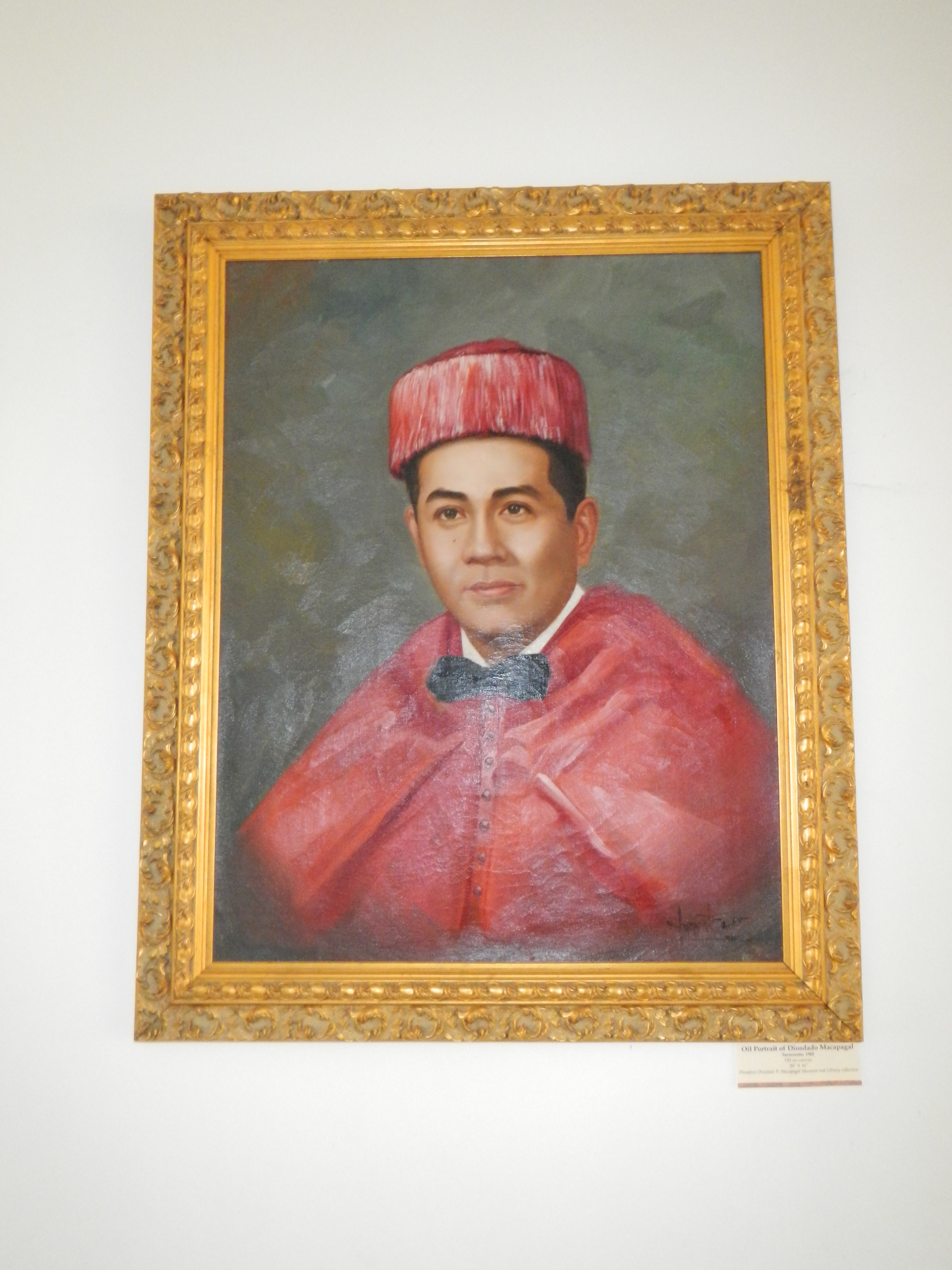
Oil portrait of Macapagal

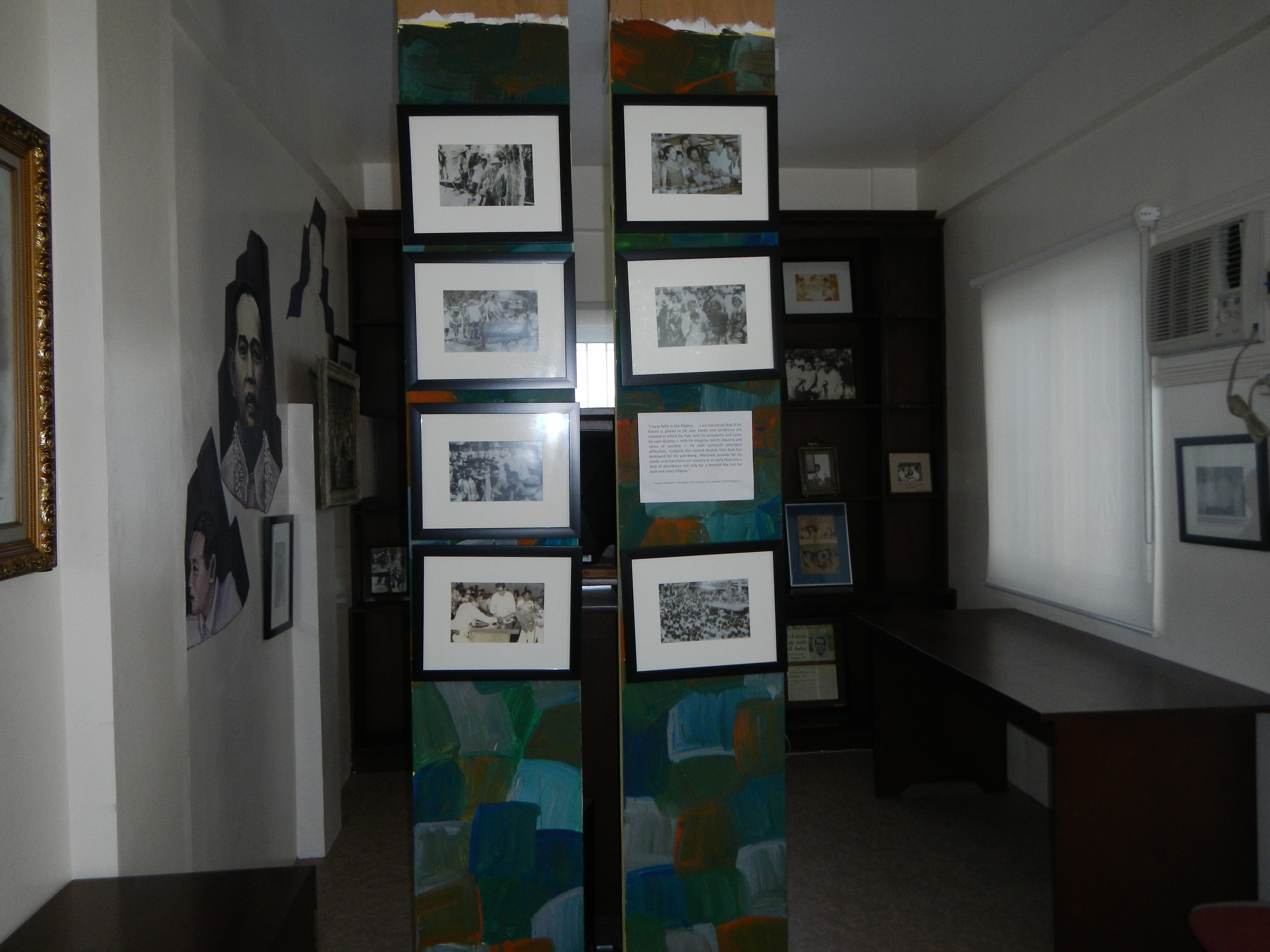
Second floor of the Museum

== Electoral history ==
Electoral history of Diosdado Macapagal
Year	Office	Party	Votes received				Result
Year	Office	Party	Total	%	P.	Swing	Result
1949	Representative (Pampanga–1st)	Liberal	—N/a	—N/a	1st	—N/a	Won
1953	Representative (Pampanga–1st)	Liberal	12,000	—N/a	1st	—N/a	Won
1955	Senator of the Philippines	Liberal	1,454,200	28.82%	9th	—N/a	Lost
1957	Vice President of the Philippines	Liberal	2,189,197	46.55%	1st	—N/a	Won
1961	President of the Philippines	Liberal	3,554,840	55.05%	1st	—N/a	Won
1965	President of the Philippines	Liberal	3,187,752	42.88%	2nd	—N/a	Lost
1970	Constitutional Convention Delegate (Pampanga–1st)	Nonpartisan	—N/a	—N/a	—N/a	—N/a	Won

== Honors ==
=== National honours ===
- Philippines:
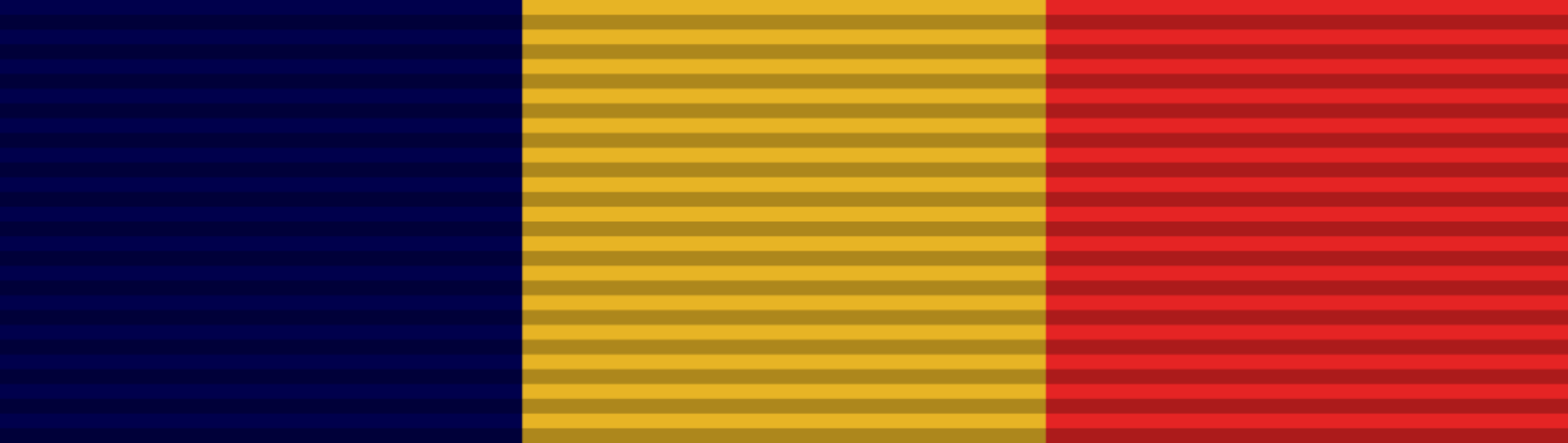
  - : Grand Cross of the Gawad Mabini (GCrM) – (1994)
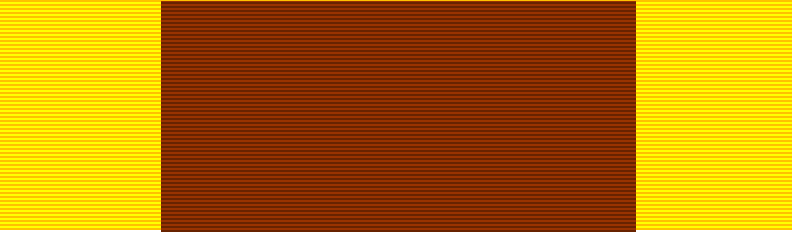
  - : Knight Grand Cross of the Order of the Knights of Rizal (KGCR).

=== Foreign honours ===
- Taiwan:
  - Grand Cordon of the Order of Brilliant Jade (May 2, 1960)
- Japan:
  - Grand Cordon of the Supreme Order of the Chrysanthemum (1962)
- (Francoist Spain) Spain:
  - Knight of the Collar of the Order of Isabella the Catholic (June 30, 1962)
- Italy:
  - Knight Grand Cross with Collar of the Order of Merit of the Italian Republic (July 1962)
- Vatican:
  - Knight with Collar of the Order of Pius IX (July 9, 1962)
- Pakistan:
  - Recipient of the Nishan-e-Pakistan (July 11, 1962)
- Sovereign Military Order of Malta:
  - Collar of the Order pro merito Melitensi
- Thailand:
  - Knight of the Order of the Rajamitrabhorn (July 9, 1963)
- West Germany:
  - Grand Cross Special Class of the Order of Merit of the Federal Republic of Germany (November 1963)

== Publications ==
- Speeches of President Diosdado Macapagal. Manila: Bureau of Printing, 1961.
- New Hope for the Common Man: Speeches and Statements of President Diosdado Macapagal. Manila: Malacañang Press Office, 1962.
- Five Year Integrated Socio-economic Program for the Philippines. Manila: [s.n.], 1963.
- Fullness of Freedom: Speeches and Statements of President Diosdado Macapagal. Manila: Bureau of Printing, 1965.
- An Asian looks at South America. Quezon City: Mac Publishing House, 1966.
- The Philippines Turns East. Quezon City: Mac Publishing House, 1966.
- A Stone for the Edifice: Memoirs of a President. Quezon City: Mac Publishing House, 1968.
- A New Constitution for the Philippines. Quezon City: Mac Publishing House, 1970.
- Democracy in the Philippines. Manila: [s.n.], 1976.
- Constitutional Democracy in the World. Manila: Santo Tomas University Press, 1993.
- From Nipa Hut to Presidential Palace: Autobiography of President Diosdado P. Macapagal. Quezon City: Philippine Academy for Continuing Education and Research, 2002.

== See also ==
- History of the Philippines (1946–1965)
- History of the Philippines
- Gloria Macapagal Arroyo
- Agricultural Land Reform Code
- MAPHILINDO

House of Representatives of the Philippines
Preceded by Amado Yuzon	Member of the House of Representatives from Pampanga's 1st district 1949–1957	Succeeded by Francisco Nepomuceno
Political offices
Preceded by Carlos P. Garcia	Vice President of the Philippines; 1957–1961	Succeeded by Emmanuel Pelaez
Preceded by Carlos P. Garcia	President of the Philippines; 1961–1965	Succeeded by Ferdinand Marcos
Preceded by Carlos P. Garcia	President of the 1971 Philippine Constitutional Convention; 1971–1973	Position abolished
Party political offices
Preceded by Eugenio Pérez	President of the Liberal Party; 1957–1961	Succeeded by Ferdinand Marcos
Preceded by José Yulo	Liberal nominee for Vice President of the Philippines; 1957	Succeeded by Emmanuel Pelaez
Preceded by José Yulo; Antonio Quirino (Quirino wing)	Liberal nominee for President of the Philippines; 1961, 1965	Succeeded by Sergio Osmeña Jr.
