= Luzon earthquake =

Luzon earthquake may refer to:

- 1645 Luzon earthquake, the earthquake on Luzon Island in the Philippines that occurred on November 30, 1645
- 1880 Southern Luzon earthquakes, the series of earthquakes that affected Manila and most of Luzon in July 1880
- 1990 Luzon earthquake, the earthquake on Luzon Island in the Philippines that occurred on July 16, 1990
- 1999 Luzon earthquake, the earthquake on Luzon Island in the Philippines that occurred on December 12, 1999
- 2019 Luzon earthquake, the earthquake on Luzon Island in the Philippines that occurred on April 22, 2019
- 2022 Luzon earthquake, the earthquake on Luzon Island in the Philippines that occurred on July 27, 2022

== See also ==
- 1968 Casiguran earthquake, the earthquake on Luzon Island in the Philippines that occurred on August 2, 1968
- List of earthquakes in the Philippines
