= 2019 Luzon earthquake =

Earthquake in Luzon, Philippines

- Location within Luzon Location within Philippines
- UTC time: 2019-04-22 09:11:09
- ISC event: 615412757
- USGS-ANSS: ComCat
- Local date: April 22, 2019
- Local time: 5:11:09 pm (PST)
- Duration: 27 seconds
- Magnitude: 6.1 M_{wp}
- Depth: 21.8 km (13.5 mi)
- Epicenter: 14°59′N 120°21′E; San Marcelino, Zambales (18km east of Castillejos, Zambales)
- Type: Strike-slip
- Areas affected: Central Luzon, Metro Manila, Calabarzon
- Total damage: PHP 539 million (US$10.5 million)
- Max. intensity: PEIS VIII (MMI VII)
- Tsunami: None
- Landslides: Mt. Tapungso, Zambales
- Aftershocks: 1,049 (16 felt) (as of May 1, 2019)
- Casualties: 18 dead; 3 missing; 256 injured

On April 22, 2019, at 5:11:09 p.m. (PST), an earthquake with a magnitude of 6.1M_{w} struck the island of Luzon in the Philippines, leaving at least 18 dead, three missing and injuring at least 256 others. Despite the fact that the epicenter was in Zambales, most of the damage to infrastructure occurred in the neighboring province of Pampanga, which suffered damage to 29 buildings and structures.

== Earthquake ==
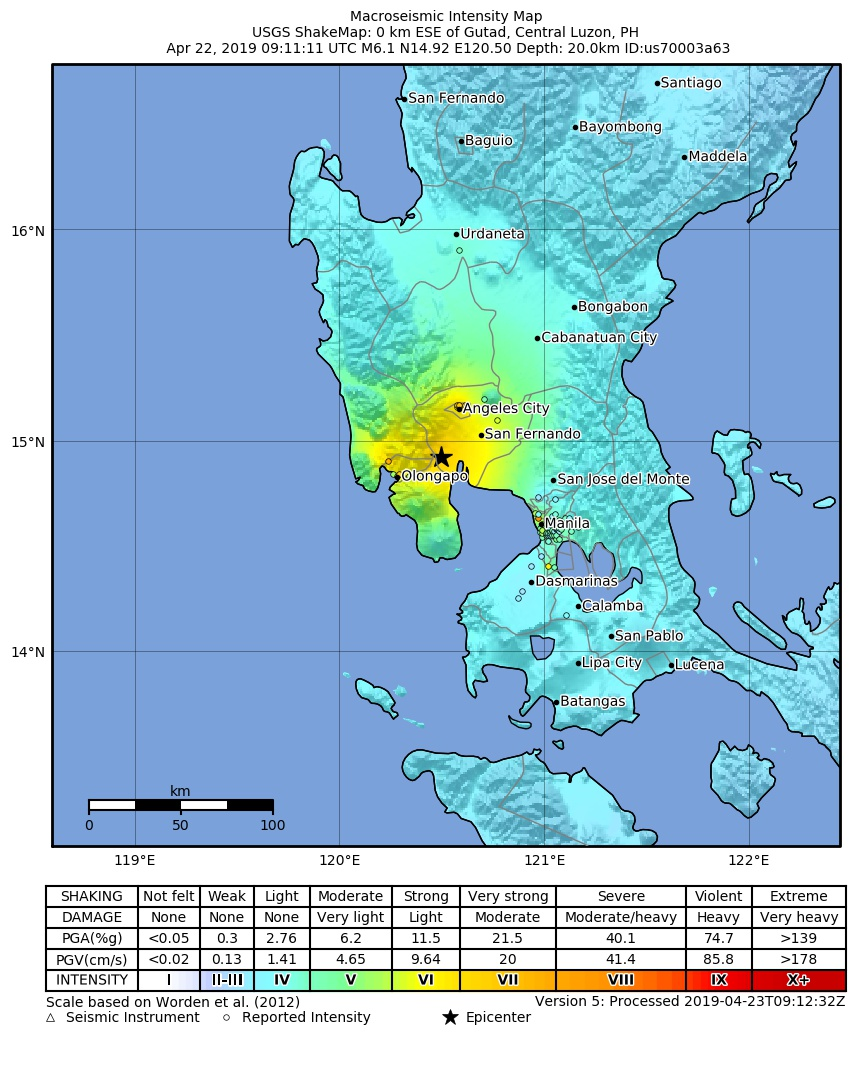
United States Geological Survey shake map for the 2019 Luzon earthquake; a maximum Mercalli intensity scale value of 6.6 was observed in Gutad, Floridablanca, Pampanga

The Philippine Institute of Volcanology and Seismology (PHIVOLCS) initially reported an earthquake of magnitude 5.7 striking at 17:11 PST with an epicenter two kilometers N 28° E of Castillejos, Zambales. The report was later revised to an earthquake of magnitude 6.1 with epicenter 18 kilometers N 58° E of Castillejos.

The fault from which the earthquake originated is yet to be determined, with geologists focusing on two nearby fault systems, the Iba Fault and the East Zambales Fault, trying to ascertain the source of the earthquake.

PHIVOLCS stated that the volcano Mount Pinatubo, located near the earthquake's epicenter, has not shown any "anomalous activity". Pinatubo is known for its major eruption in 1991, which may have been related to a major 7.7 magnitude earthquake in 1990. PHIVOLCS added that the earthquake could not trigger an eruption of Pinatubo, explaining that the volcano's magma supply has not sufficiently replenished since 1991 to allow for an eruption.

== Casualties ==
As of April 29, 2019, the National Disaster Risk Reduction and Management Council confirmed 18 deaths, 3 people missing and 256 injuries. Of the 18 reported dead, five died in the collapsed four-storey Chuzon Supermarket in the municipality of Porac, seven elsewhere in the town, two in Lubao, one in Angeles City, and one in San Marcelino, Zambales.

== Damage and effects ==
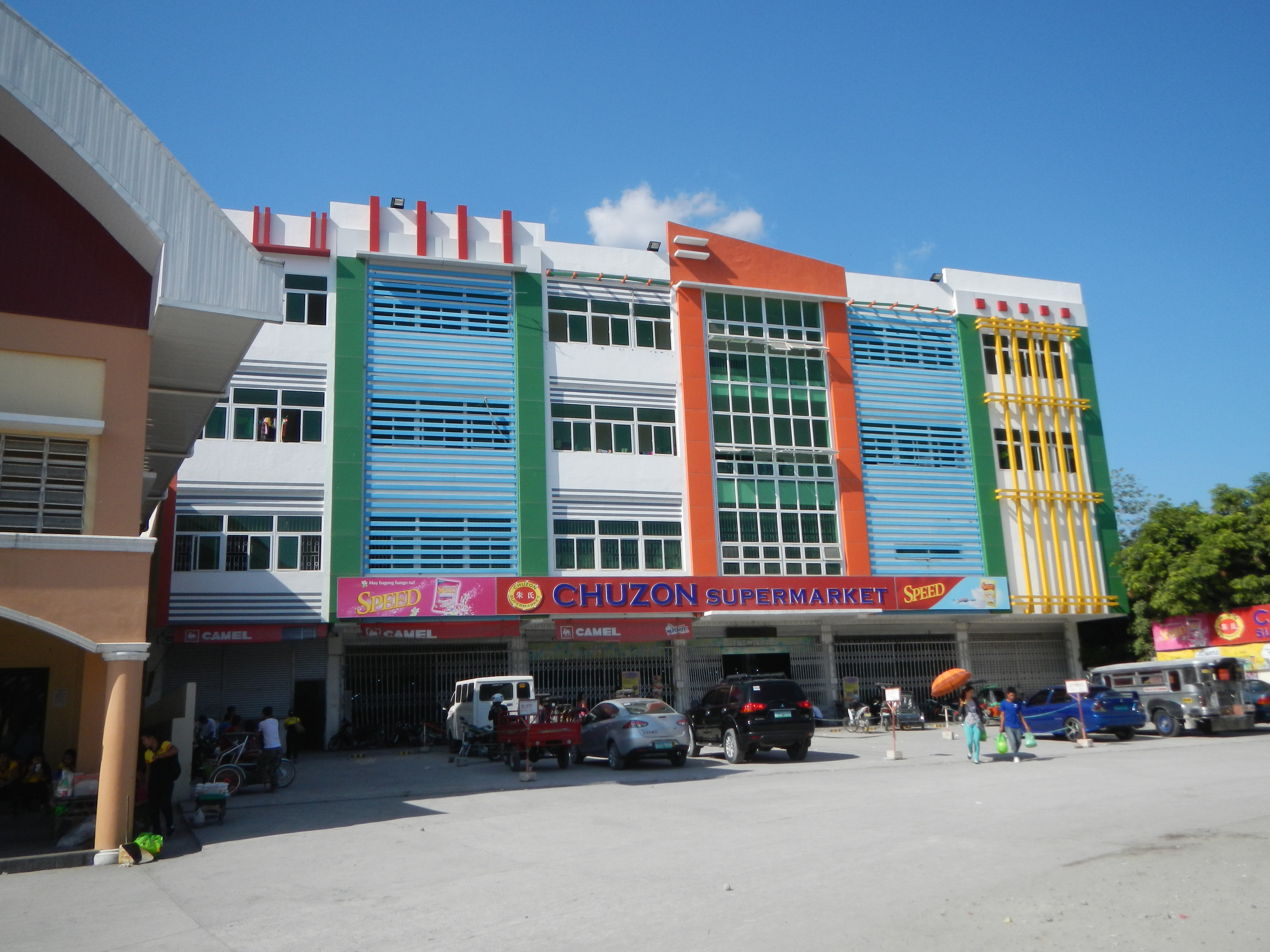
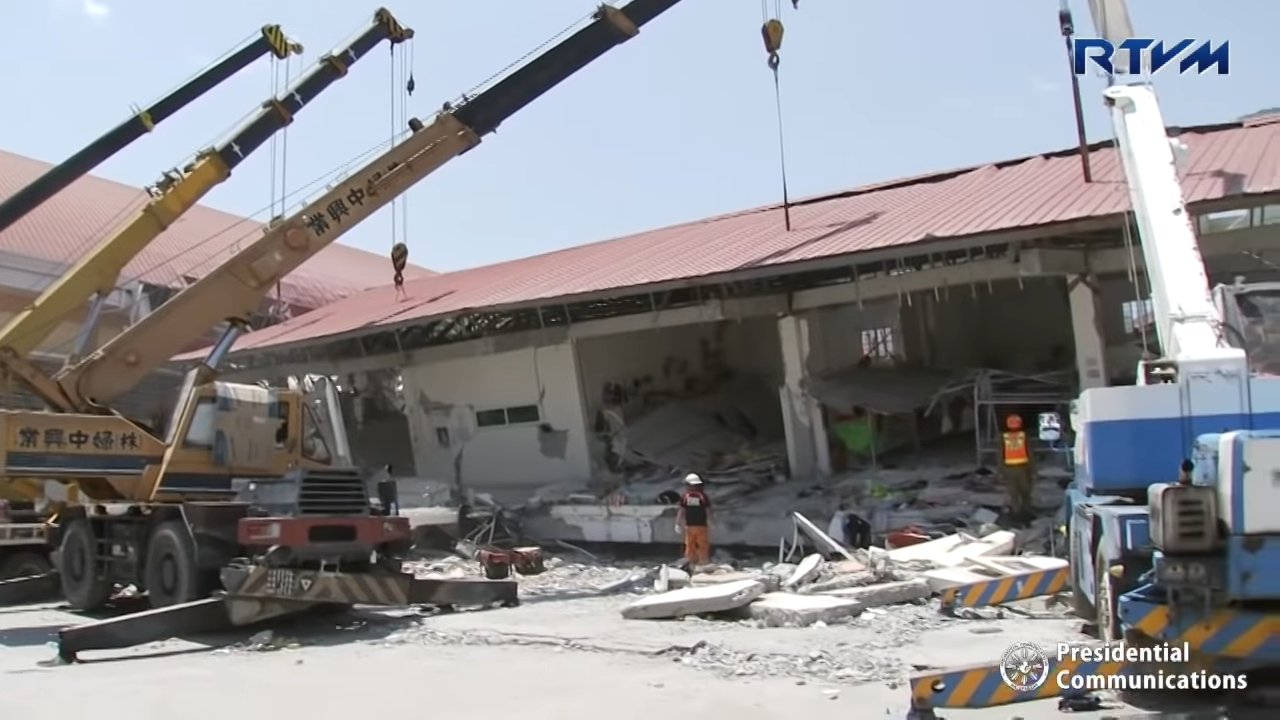
Chuzon Supermarket in Porac before and after the earthquake

State seismologists said that Zambales had been spared from the earthquake destruction, despite the location of the epicenter being there, although the reports of fatalities and the damage have yet to be received by the local authorities. The neighboring province of Pampanga suffered damage to 29 structures/buildings and was the area most affected by the earthquake, due to the province sitting on soft sediment and alluvial soil.

There have been at least 421 aftershocks reported but only 8 were felt.

=== Government infrastructure ===
The Bataan-Pampanga boundary arch collapsed, and the control tower and passenger's terminal of Clark International Airport damaged. In Central Luzon, 5 dams were damaged and in need of immediate repairs, with an estimated cost of 20 million pesos, according to the National Irrigation Administration (NIA).

=== Commercial buildings ===
The site where the most casualties occurred during the earthquake was a branch of the Chuzon Supermarket in Porac, Pampanga which collapsed, killing five people. CCTV footage from the store showed the collapse of the second floor of the building just 10 seconds into the earthquake. The Department of the Interior and Local Government ordered the suspension of operations of all Chuzon branches and investigated its collapse. Some branches resumed operations in 2020.

=== Power ===
The 2019 Luzon earthquake (M_{w} 6.1) and all large earthquakes (M_{w} ≥ 7.0) in Central Luzon. These were in 1968 (Casiguran), 1970, 1977 (in Cagayan Valley), 1985, 1990, and 1999.
Geologically, to the left is the Manila Trench and the Iba Fault in Zambales. In the center is the Digdig Fault in Nueva Ecija. To the right is the diagonal Casiguran Fault in Aurora, then the East Luzon Trench.

Power outages were reported in the provinces of Bataan, La Union, Pampanga and Pangasinan, as well as in parts of Quezon, Batangas, Camarines Sur and Sorsogon, but were later corrected. The National Grid Corporation of the Philippines (NGCP) issued an alert level at yellow status on the Luzon grid after the initial earthquake.

=== Schools, colleges and universities ===
Following the earthquake, classes in all levels were suspended. Numerous schools, universities and colleges that were affected by the earthquake announced class suspension for April 23 and 24. The Department of Education ordered the thorough inspection of school buildings and facilities in the affected areas. A 10-story building of Emilio Aguinaldo College along United Nations Avenue in Manila was reported to have tilted and leaned onto the adjacent building, causing its fiberglass terrace to hit the other building. Soil liquefaction underneath the building was seen as probable causes. One lane of United Nations Avenue was closed to vehicular traffic to ensure the safety of motorists. An assessment team composed of private and local government structural engineers stated that the building's structural integrity remains intact.

=== Churches ===
Several churches in Pampanga were damaged or collapsed. The belfry of the 17th-century San Agustin Church in Lubao was partly damaged, while the bell tower of the 19th-century Santa Catalina de Alejandria Church in Porac collapsed. The Holy Rosary Parish Church in Angeles City sustained damage to the church's ceiling, pillars and windows.

=== Transport ===
Train services in Metro Manila were halted followed by an extensive inspection. All lines were closed for the rest of the day pending an inspection that later found no damage to the railway system. A crack on the girder was reported at LRT Line 2 Recto station, but was found to have existed before the earthquake and was superficial, according to the Department of Transportation (DOTr).

== Rescue efforts ==
The authorities began the search and rescue operations for the survivors in the collapsed supermarket in Porac; however, the operation was suspended when a 4.5-magnitude aftershock hit the neighboring town in Castillejos, Zambales on April 24 at 2:02 am (PST).

== See also ==
- 1968 Casiguran earthquake
- 1990 Luzon earthquake
- 1999 Luzon earthquake
- 2019 Eastern Samar earthquake – occurred less than a day later
- List of earthquakes in 2019
- List of earthquakes in the Philippines
- Philippine Trench
