= Lubao =

Municipality in Pampanga, Philippines

- Municipality
- Municipality of Lubao
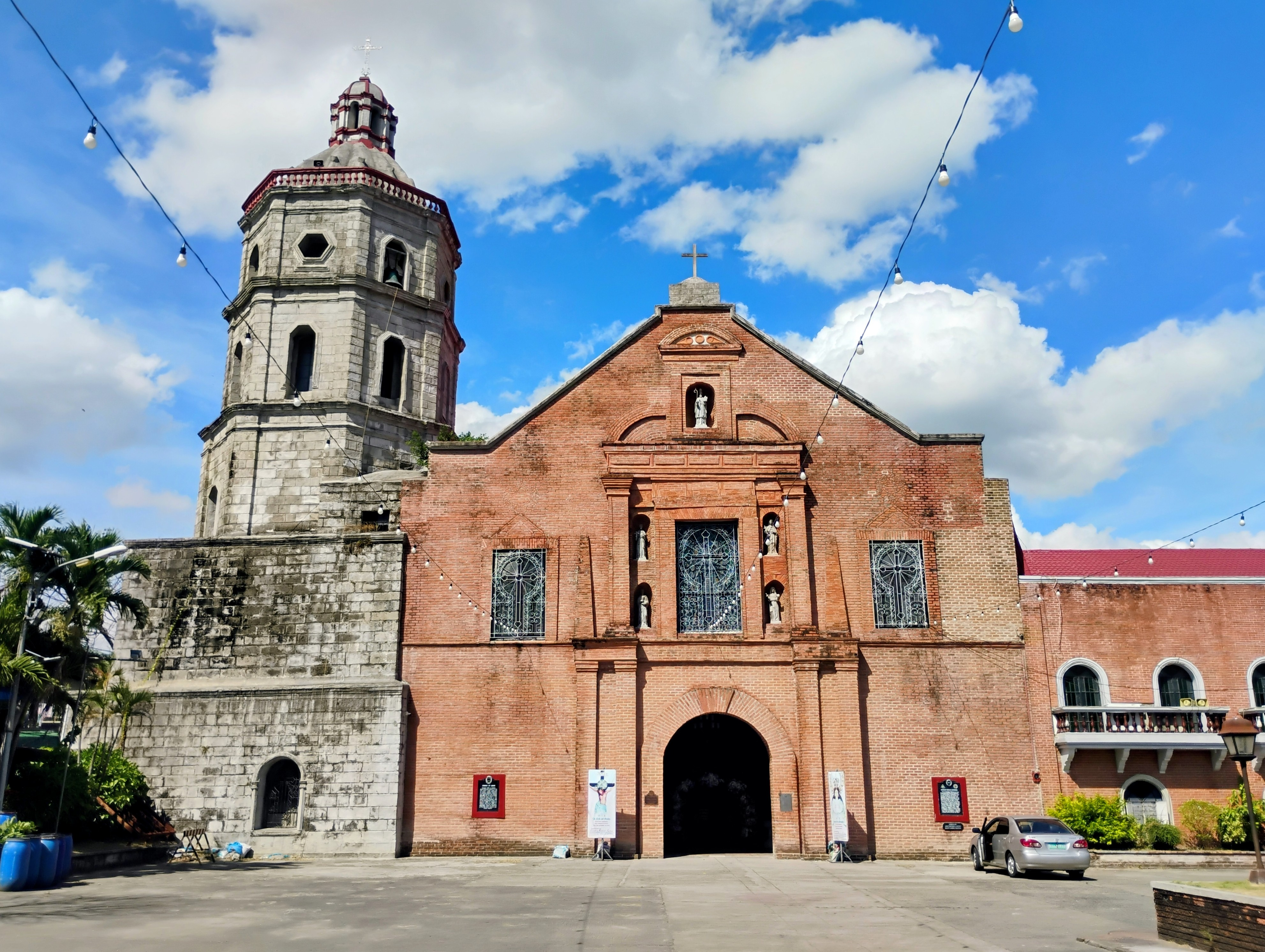
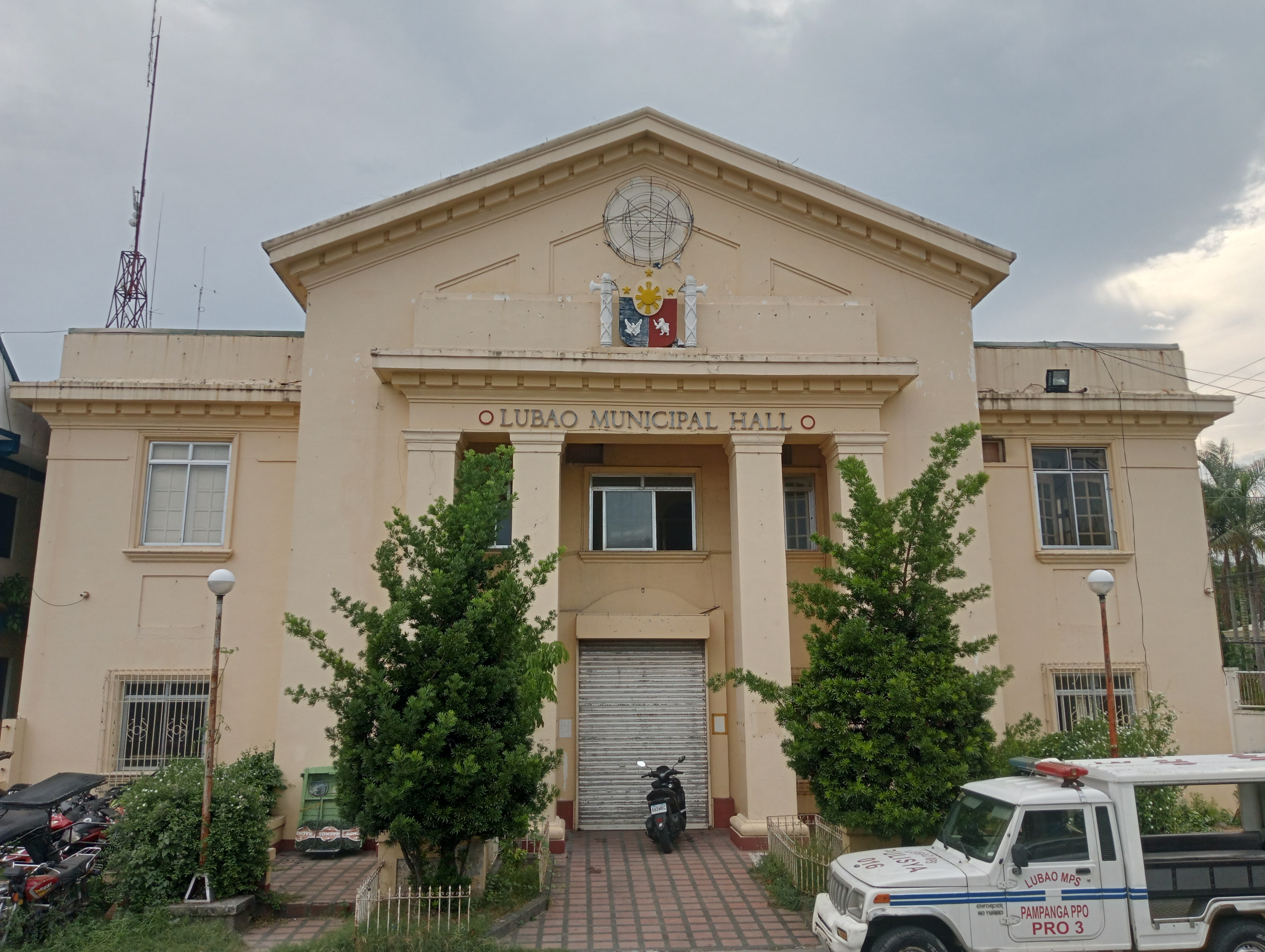
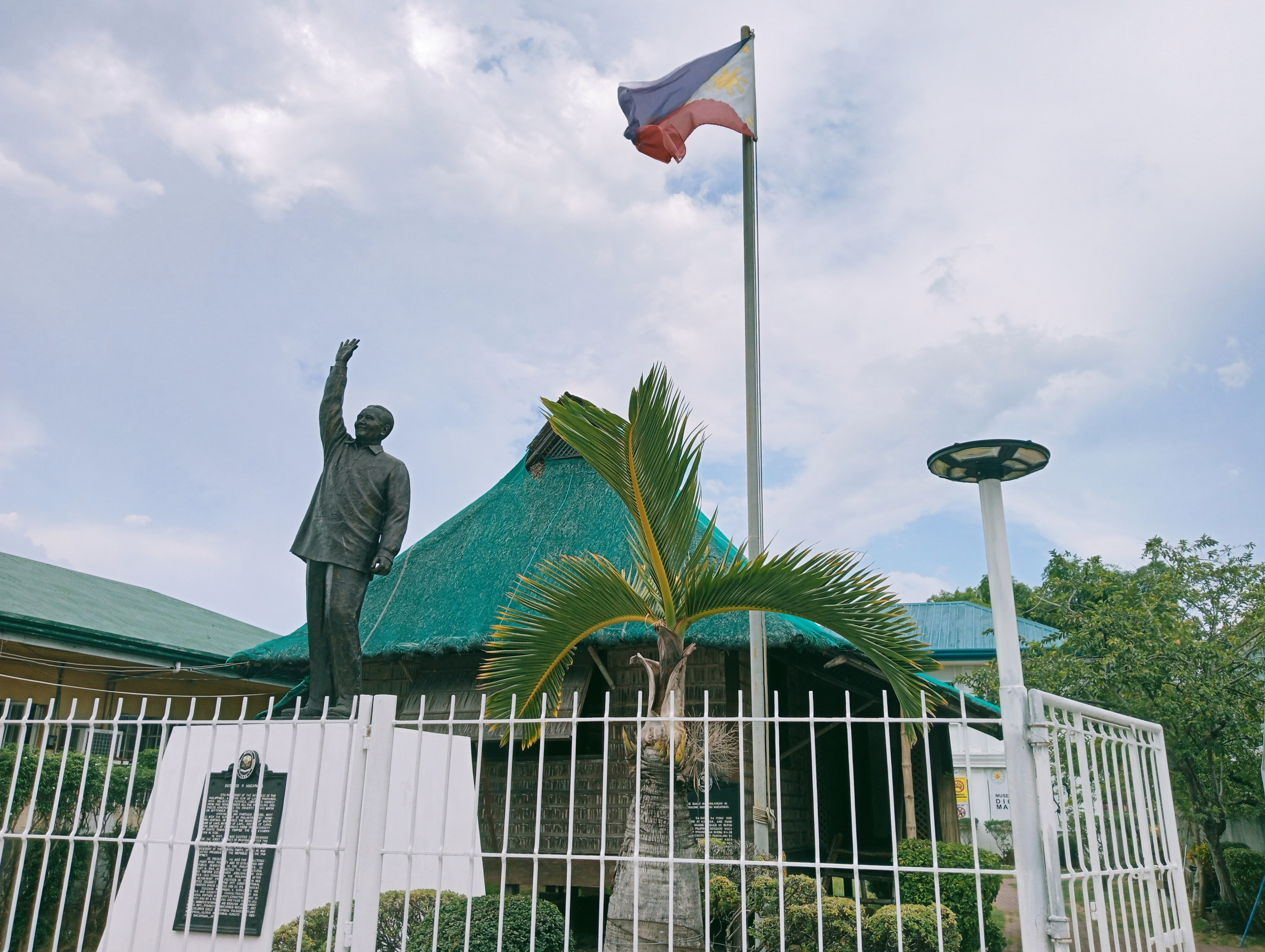
- Saint Augustine Parish Church Old Lubao Municipal Hall Diosdado Macapagal Museum

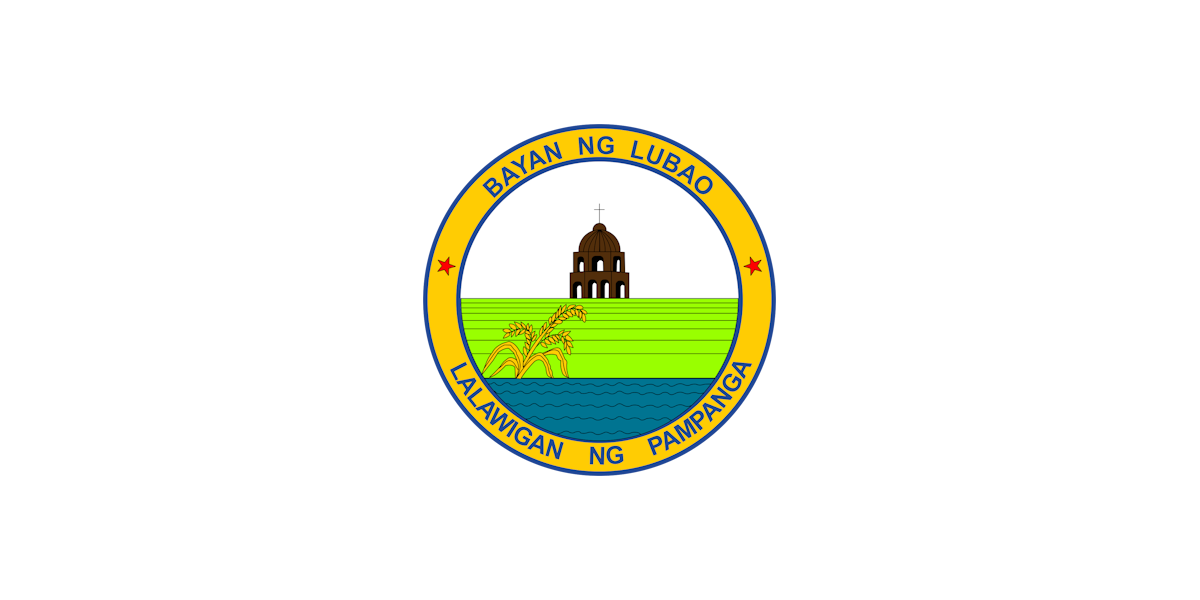
- Flag Seal
- Nickname: Balen Baba
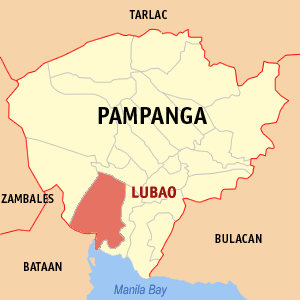
- Map of Pampanga with Lubao highlighted
- Interactive map of Lubao
- Location within the Philippines
- Coordinates: 14°56′N 120°36′E
- Country: Philippines
- Region: Central Luzon
- Province: Pampanga
- District: 2nd district
- Founded: September 14, 1571
- Barangays: 44 (see Barangays)

Government
  - Type: Sangguniang Bayan
  - Mayor: Esmeralda G. Pineda
  - Vice Mayor: Jay B. Montemayor
  - Representative: Gloria Macapagal-Arroyo
  - Municipal Council: Members: Darwin D. Lingad; Edgar A. Dabu; Elmer N. Malit; Salvador B. Dimson Jr.; Corinthian P. De Leon; Richard M. Diaz; Nennette M. Morales-Padua; Romeo B. Torno
  - Electorate: 94,702 voters (2025)

Area
  - Total: 155.77 km^{2} (60.14 sq mi)
- Elevation: 7.0 m (23.0 ft)
- Highest elevation: 53 m (174 ft)
- Lowest elevation: −6 m (−20 ft)

Population (2024 census)
  - Total: 190,355
  - Density: 1,222.0/km^{2} (3,165.0/sq mi)
  - Households: 40,593

Economy
  - Income class: 1st municipal income class
  - Poverty incidence: 8.68% (2023)
  - Revenue: ₱ 577.8 million (2024)
  - Assets: ₱ 1,648 million (2024)
  - Expenditure: ₱ 549.6 million (2024)
  - Liabilities: ₱ 504.8 million (2024)

Service provider
  - Electricity: Pampanga 2 Electric Cooperative (PELCO 2)
- Time zone: UTC+8 (PST)
- ZIP code: 2005, 2025 (Santa Cruz)
- PSGC: 0305408000
- IDD : area code: +63 (0)45
- Native languages: Kapampangan; Tagalog
- Website: www.lubao.gov.ph

Lubao, officially the Municipality of Lubao (Kapampangan: Balen ning Lubao; Filipino: Bayan ng Lubao), is a municipality in the province of Pampanga, Philippines. According to the 2024 census, it has a population of 190,355 people.

The town is known as the birthplace of Diosdado Macapagal, the 9th President of the Philippines.

== Etymology ==
The town's name is derived from the indigenous term lubo which means low or sunken, reflective of the area's muddy and flooded characteristics. Lubao is also known by its Kapampangan language equivalent Baba.

According to Spanish records by Fr. Diego Martínez, Lubao was also once called Lubag.

== History ==
=== Precolonial era ===
Before the arrival of the Spaniards, Lubao was said to have already been one of the most prosperous major settlements in Pampanga. It is also the oldest as well as the cradle of Kapampangan civilization.

By 1571, Lubao was a heavily fortified settlement claimed to be under the rule of Datu Macabulus, the last chieftain of Lubao who was part of the Soliman clan of Lubao. It is also claimed that the Soliman clan were the origin of the rulers of Maynila, such as Lakandula, Rajah Matanda and Rajah Sulayman, although this is not widely mentioned in scholarly works, except by historian John Larkin, who suggested that Rajah Sulayman was possibly from Lubao. Revolutionary leader of Tarlac, Francisco Macabulos, whose father himself was from Lubao, was a descendant of Datu Macabulus.

According to Governor-General Francisco de Sande, Lubao was the site of a major river in Pampanga, which helped the settlement produce large amounts of rice. By 1572, Lubao housed 3,500 people, who were described to be Moros, suggesting that Islam had already reached Lubao by the time of Spanish conquest.

=== Spanish colonial era ===
After the disastrous defeat at the Battle of Bangkusay on June 3, 1571 between the Spanish and Visayan mercenary forces of Legazpi and the combined Kapampangan-Tagalog fleet under Rajah Sulayman and Tarik Sulayman of Macabebe, Betis and Lubao remained defiant to Spanish rule, forcing the Spaniards to launch an invasion against them. After the Spanish conquest of Pampanga, Martín de Goiti, together with Lt. Antonio Carvajal and the Augustinian missionaries established Lubao as a Spanish settlement on September 14, 1571 after Datu Macabulus and the Council of Elders received the Spaniards with conciliatory promises of capitulation.

Fr. Diego de Herrera first established a convent in the settlement where the locals constructed a brick church called the San Agustin Church in the nearby village of Gato in 1572, marking the beginning of Christianization of Lubao. Gato became a visita of Tondo in May 3 of the same year. In 1579, Fr. Francisco Manrique began his missionary efforts in the town.

In 1583, Kapampangans were forced to work in the goldmines of Ilocos and not allowed to return in time for the planting season, causing a severe food shortage and eventual famine in Lubao, leading to the deaths of 1,000 people in the town by 1584. Due to this aforementioned disaster and the abuses by encomenderos, a mass uprising occurred in Lubao in 1585 and other Kapampangan settlements, but were suppressed afterwards.

In 1589, Philip III of Spain ordered Governor-General Gómez Pérez Dasmariñas in the construction of a fort in Lubao after the recent raids by Sambals from the nearby Zambales region.

In 1591, Lubao was described to be an encomienda along with Betis under the Spanish crown, which housed 5,000 tributes which amounted to 20,000 inhabitants, with four Augustinian convents and an alcalde mayor with a deputy.

After the Francisco Maniago Revolt in October 1660, the people of Lubao was successfully persuaded by Juan Macapagal of Arayat to end their participation in the revolt. As a result of the revolt, Governor-General Sabiniano Manrique de Lara ordered the construction of a fort in Lubao called the Fortaleza de Mamalas, to serve as a garrison fort for any future revolts in the town.

=== Revolutionary era ===
On November 17, 1896, the people of Bataan invited the locals of Lubao to join in the attack against the Spanish church in Hermosa. The people of Lubao accepted the invitation, and together with the combined forces of the people from the towns of Lubao, Orani, Hermosa and Hagonoy in Bulacan, they attacked the Hermosa Church and proceeded to behead and mutilate the fingers and genitals of Fr. David Varas. Other parts of his body were turned into amulets (anting-anting). After the incident, Spanish forces along with a Kapampangan contingent launched an offensive against the revolutionaries at Orani, leading to the deaths of 200 revolutionaries. Two Spanish contingents were then assigned in the nearby towns of Dinalupihan and Hermosa.

On June 3, 1898, Spanish religious authorities fled from Bataan and Lubao towards Macabebe, which was followed by a takeover by revolutionaries, who were later absorbed into the Philippine Revolutionary Army. On June 12, the Philippines under President Emilio Aguinaldo declared independence from Spain.

=== Philippine-American War ===
In 1899, the Church of Lubao was used as a hospital by American soldiers fighting the Philippine Republican Army. On September 22, 1900, the Military Government of the Philippine Islands under the United States placed Lubao under a civil administration. Between 1911–1912, a group of outlaws began raiding various barrios of Lubao near the Bataan border.

=== World War II ===
On December 8, 1941, the Japanese Invasion of the Philippines began. On January 3, 1942, the Japanese 2nd Formosa Infantry pushed the USAFIP 11th Infantry south from Guagua, then on to Lubao in the evening of the 4th, and then to the Gumain River by the 5th.

In January, Silvestre Liwanag reported the presence of armed groups of the Aguman ding Maldang Talapagobra stationed in the nearby mountains carrying homemade guns and stolen rifles from hacienderos in defiance to Japanese rule in Lubao, in which Liwanag would later join the group. These groups were later incorporated into the Hukbalahap, the leading communist resistance guerrilla organization at the time.

== Geography ==
Located in the south-western part of Pampanga, Lubao is bounded by the municipalities of Sasmuan on the east, Guagua on the north-east, Floridablanca on the north and Hermosa, on the south. It is one of the three coastal towns in Pampanga along with Sasmuan and Macabebe and it is also noted for rice, sugar cane, fish, and sampaguita.

Lubao is 18 kilometres (11 mi) from San Fernando, 35 kilometres (22 mi) from Angeles City, 84 kilometres (52 mi) from Manila, and 8 kilometres (5.0 mi) from Guagua.

=== Barangays ===
Lubao is politically subdivided into 44 barangays, as shown below. Each barangay consists of puroks and some have sitios.

Cluster 1:

- San Isidro
- Santiago
- Santo Niño (Prado Saba)
- San Roque Arbol
- Baruya (San Rafael)
- Lourdes (Lauc Pau)
- Prado Siongco

Cluster 2:

- San Jose Gumi
- Balantacan
- Santa Teresa 2nd
- Bancal Sinubli
- Bancal Pugad
- Calangain

Cluster 3:

- San Pedro Palcarangan
- San Pedro Saug
- San Pablo 1st
- San Pablo 2nd
- De La Paz
- Santa Cruz

Cluster 4:

- Remedios
- Santa Maria
- Del Carmen
- San Agustin
- Santa Rita
- Santa Teresa 1st

Cluster 5:

- Santo Tomas (Poblacion)
- San Roque Dau
- Santo Cristo
- San Matias
- Don Ignacio Dimson
- Santa Monica

Cluster 6:

- Santo Domingo
- San Miguel
- Concepcion
- San Francisco
- San Vicente
- San Antonio
- San Jose Apunan

Cluster 7:

- San Nicolas 2nd
- San Juan (Poblacion)
- San Nicolas 1st (Poblacion)
- Santa Barbara
- Santa Catalina
- Santa Lucia (Poblacion)

=== Climate ===
Climate data for Lubao, Pampanga
Month	Jan	Feb	Mar	Apr	May	Jun	Jul	Aug	Sep	Oct	Nov	Dec	Year
Mean daily maximum °C (°F)	30 (86)	31 (88)	33 (91)	34 (93)	33 (91)	31 (88)	29 (84)	29 (84)	29 (84)	30 (86)	31 (88)	30 (86)	31 (87)
Mean daily minimum °C (°F)	19 (66)	20 (68)	21 (70)	23 (73)	25 (77)	25 (77)	25 (77)	25 (77)	24 (75)	23 (73)	22 (72)	20 (68)	23 (73)
Average precipitation mm (inches)	8 (0.3)	9 (0.4)	15 (0.6)	34 (1.3)	138 (5.4)	203 (8.0)	242 (9.5)	233 (9.2)	201 (7.9)	126 (5.0)	50 (2.0)	21 (0.8)	1,280 (50.4)
Average rainy days	3.7	4.1	6.5	11.2	21.2	24.9	27.7	26.5	25.5	21.8	12.6	5.6	191.3
Source: Meteoblue

== Demographics ==
Population census of Lubao

Year	Pop.	±% p.a.
1903	19,063	—
1918	21,614	+0.84%
1939	29,154	+1.44%
1948	36,574	+2.55%
1960	44,129	+1.58%
1970	61,608	+3.39%
1975	69,903	+2.57%
1980	77,502	+2.08%

Year	Pop.	±% p.a.
1990	99,705	+2.55%
1995	109,667	+1.80%
2000	125,699	+2.97%
2007	143,058	+1.80%
2010	150,843	+1.95%
2015	160,838	+1.23%
2020	173,502	+1.61%
2024	190,355	+2.25%

Source: Philippine Statistics Authority

In the 2024 census, the population of Lubao was 190,355 people, with a density of 1,200 inhabitants per square kilometre or 3,100 inhabitants per square mile.

=== Religion ===
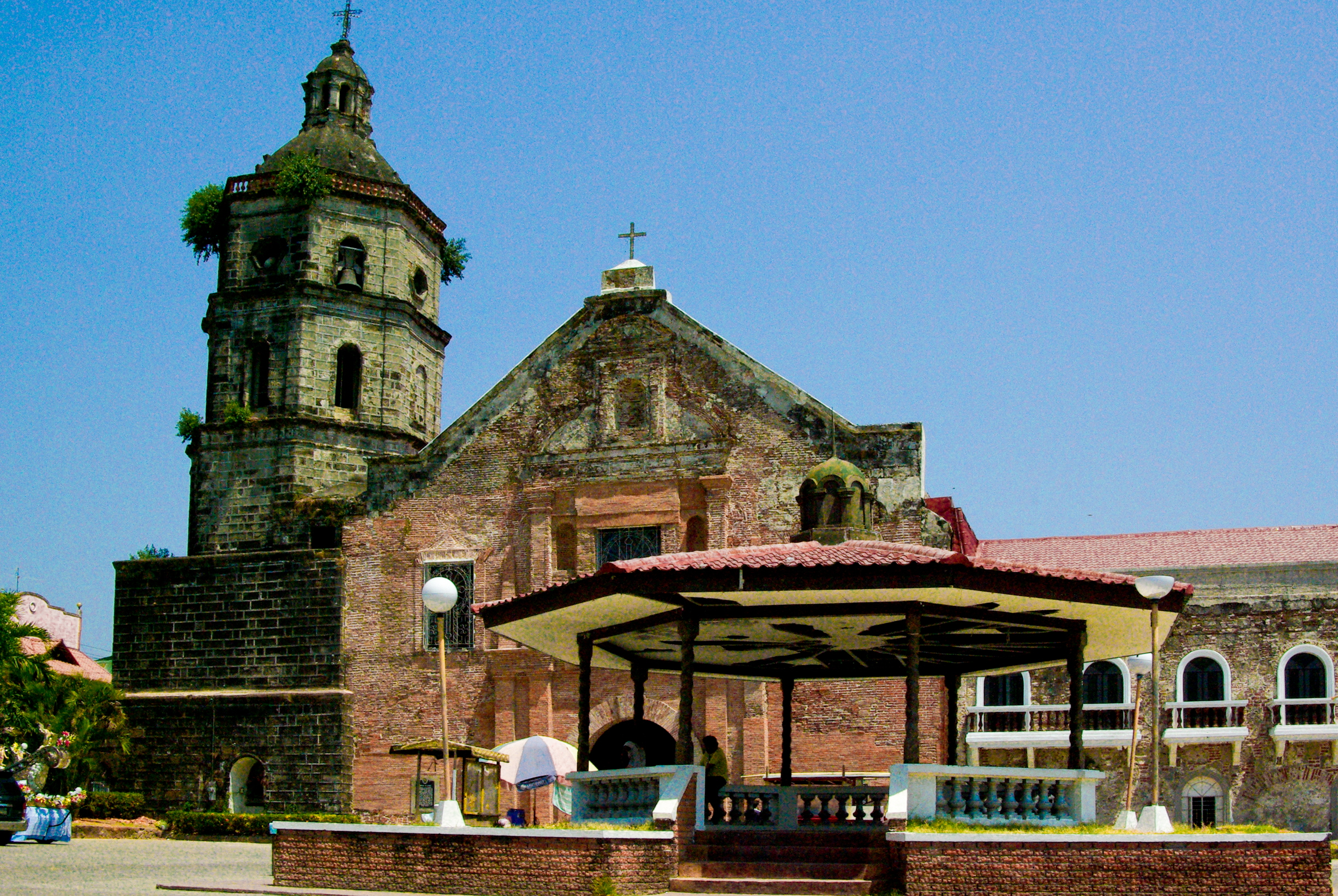
Saint Augustine Church (oldest in Pampanga - 1572)

As the first Augustinian missionary center in Central and Northern Luzon, majority of the residents in Lubao are Roman Catholics.

Lubao at present has six parishes :

- San Agustin Parish, Plaza, Lubao (oldest in Pampanga - Established 1572)
- San Roque Dau Parish, San Roque Dau, Lubao (established Oct.1, 1990)
- Holy Cross Parish, Santa Cruz, Lubao (established May 22, 1951)
- San Rafael Parish, Baruya, Lubao (established August 31, 1939)
- San Antonio de Padua Parish, San Antonio, Lubao (established November 10, 1986)
- Conversion of St. Paul Parish, San Pablo 1st, Lubao (established - 2010)

There are adherents of Iglesia ni Cristo wherein a chapel in Barangay Baruya was opened on November 26, 2011, with Pastoral Visitation of the present Executive Minister of the Iglesia ni Cristo Brother Eduardo V. Manalo.

The Church of Jesus Christ of Latter-day Saints (Mormons) has also significant numbers of member in the town. On August 17, 2012, they celebrated their 25th Year anniversary of the Opening of the Missionary work in the said town with Cong. Juan Miguel Macapagal Arroyo as the special guest. The chapel is located at Santa Cruz, Lubao, Pampanga with 600 Members.

Other religion includes Protestantism and Nondenominational Christianity. Among the Protestant churches in Lubao are the United Methodist Church, C&MA, Pentecostal, and Baptist.

The Seventh-day Adventist Church that has 1,100 members is also a denomination known for giving community services and a free livelihood seminar to the town all year round.

== Economy ==
Poverty incidence of Lubao (%)

Source: Philippine Statistics Authority

== Culture ==
=== Sampaguita Festival ===
The Parish of Saint Augustine celebrated its 440th Founding Anniversary on May 5, 2012, with the launching of the 1st Sampaguita Festival; participated by the six parishes of Lubao. Parish of St. Augustine de Hippo bagged the Over-All Champion trophy.

The 2nd Sampaguita Festival was held on May 5, 2013, participated by the 10 secondary public schools of Lubao. San Vicente National High School emerged as the Over-All Champion of the festival.

The 3rd Sampaguita Festival was celebrated on May 4, 2014, and participated by the 7 clustered barangays of Lubao. Cluster 6 (Cluster Malagu - Barangay Santo Domingo, San Miguel, Concepcion, San Francisco, San Vicente,

=== Philippine International Balloon Festival ===
The 1st ever Philippine International Balloon Festival was held on April 10–13, 2014 in Barangay Prado Siongco, Lubao, Pampanga. It was organized by Pilipinas International Balloon Festival, Inc. (PIBF) in cooperation with the Arts, Culture and Tourism Office of Pampanga (ACTO) with the theme "It's More Than Just Hot Air"

=== Lubao International Balloon Festival ===
The 2nd Lubao International Balloon Festival was held on March 26 to 29, 2015 in Pradera Verde, Prado Siongco, Lubao, Pampanga. It was organized by Forthinker Inc. Philippines. It was touted as the biggest annual hot air balloon festival in Southeast Asia that featured more than forty (40) colorful hot air balloons from different countries all over the world, fourteen (14) of which are special shaped balloons like Darth Vader, Yoda, Humpty Dumpty and Frog.

The 3rd edition of Lubao International Balloon Festival was held on April 14–17, 2016 in Pradera Verde, Prado Siongco, Lubao, Pampanga.

=== Lubao International Balloon and Music Festival ===
From April 6 to 9, 2017, the Lubao International Balloon and Music Festival was held. International artists (Alex Aiono and Redfoo) and local artists (Sponge Cola, Gloc 9, Parokya ni Edgar, Moonstar88, Yeng Constantino and Bamboo) performed at the event.

== Government ==
=== Local government ===
Esmeralda Pineda, Mayor of Lubao since 2019

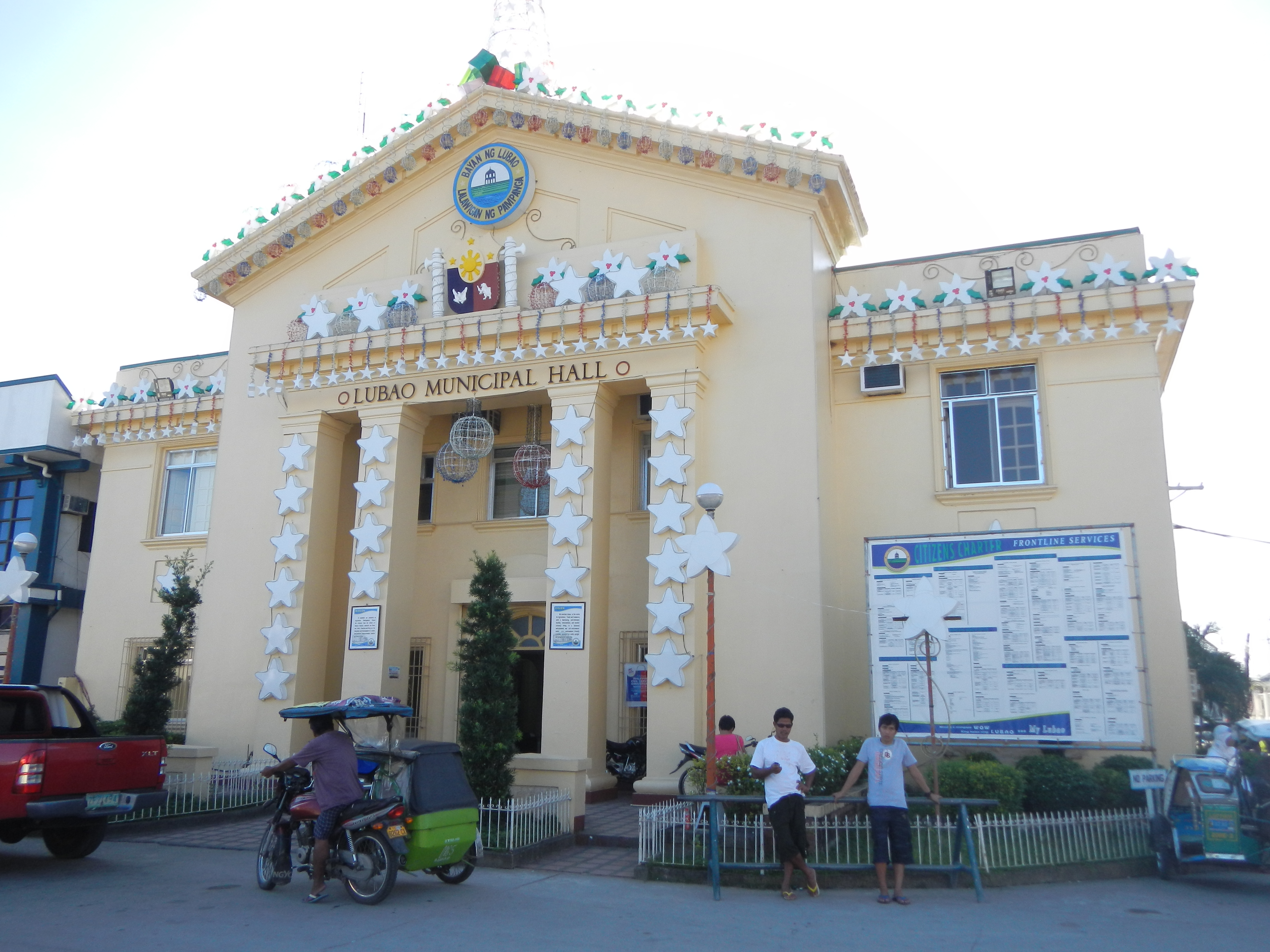
Lubao Old Town Hall

New Lubao municipal hall

The municipal government is divided into three branches: executive, legislative and judiciary. The executive branch is composed of the mayor and the barangay captains. The legislative branch is composed of the Sangguniang Bayan (town assembly), Sangguniang Barangay (barangay council), and the Sangguniang Kabataan for the youth sector.

==== Notable mayors ====
- Lilia Pineda, mayor 1992–2001
- Dennis Pineda, mayor 2001–2010
- Mylyn Pineda-Cayabyab, mayor 2010–2019
- Esmeralda Pineda, mayor 2019–present

== Landmarks and notable heritage structures ==
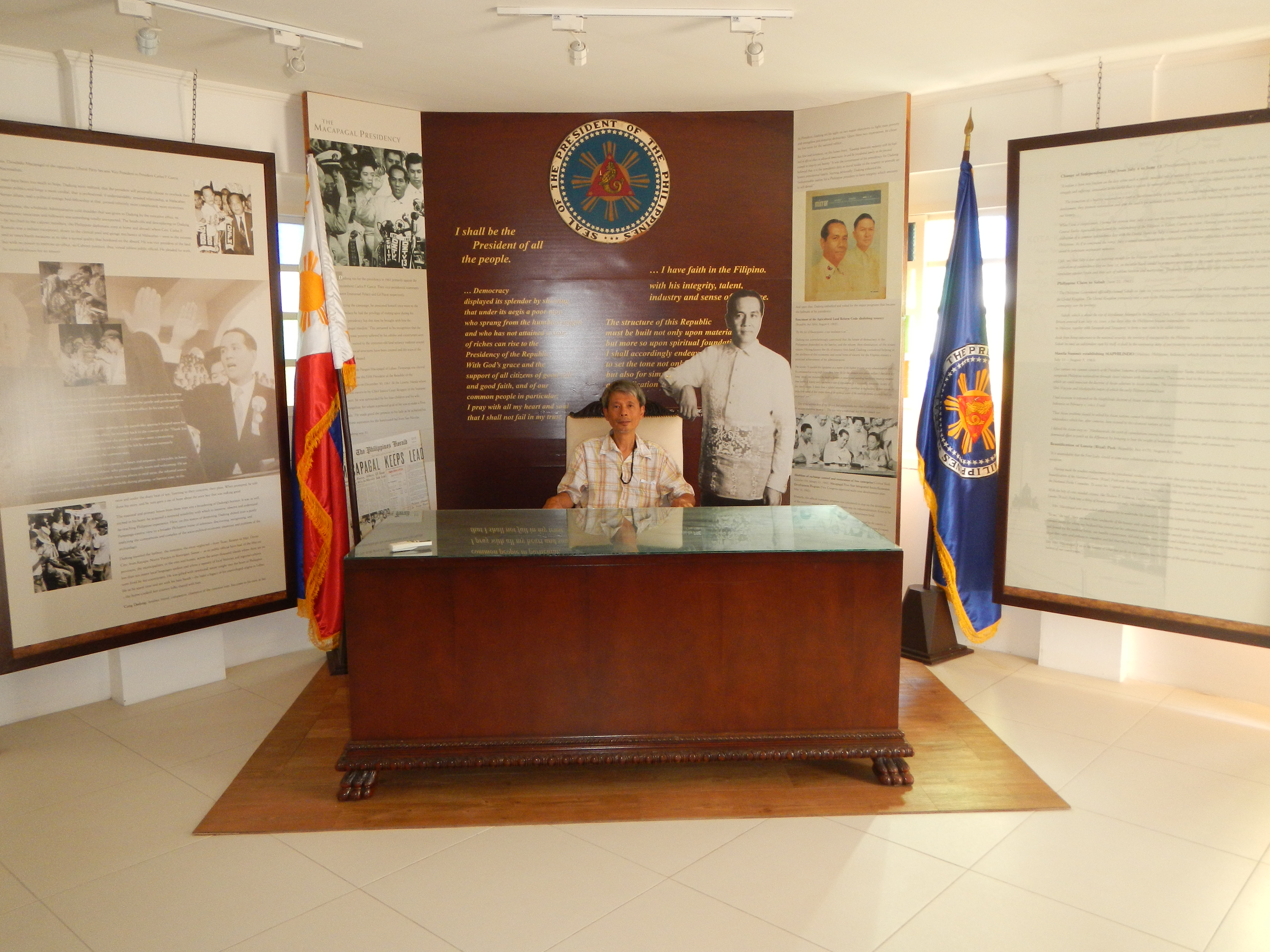
Diosdado Macapagal Museum

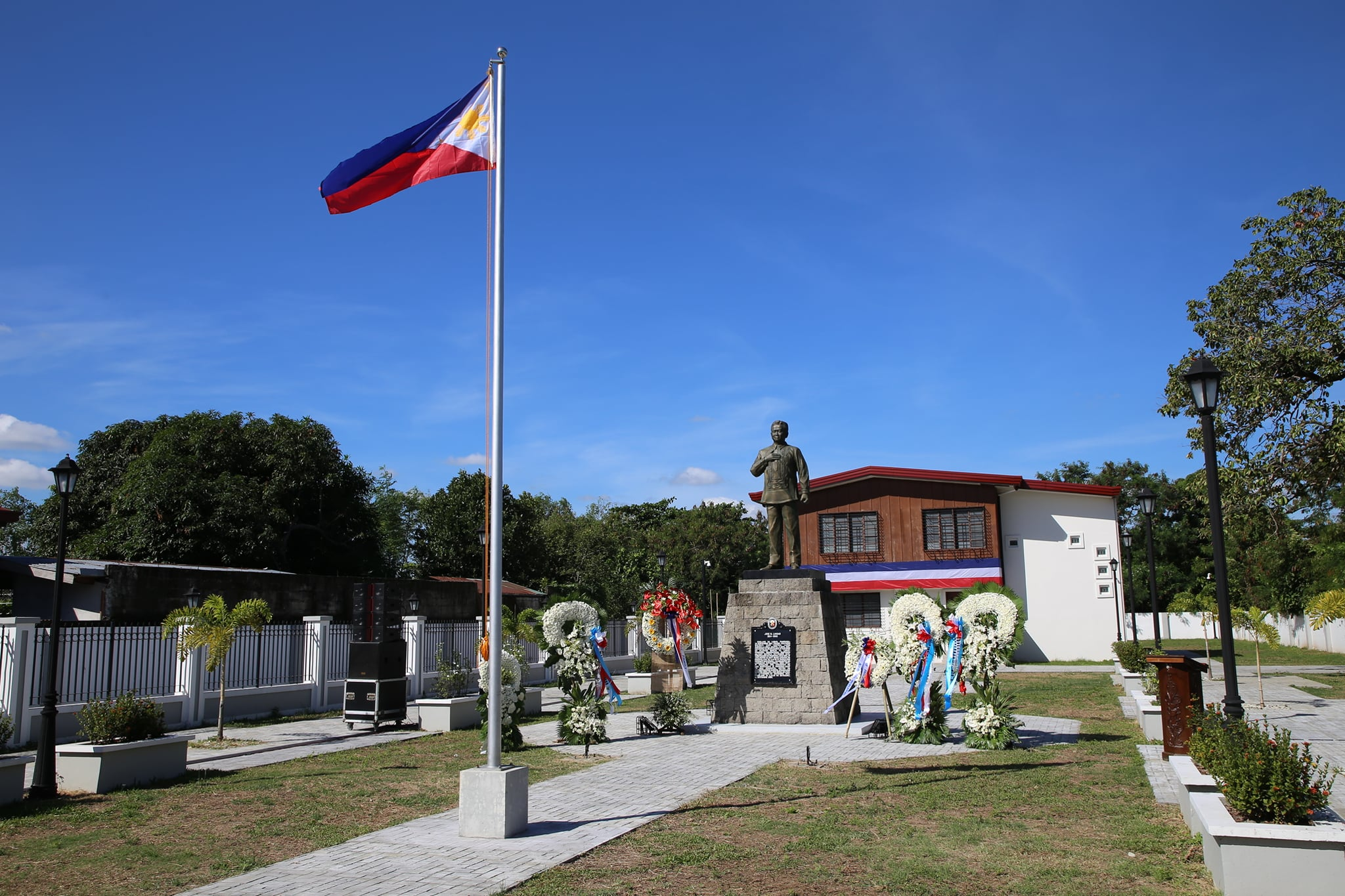
Jose B. Lingad Park and Museum

=== Lubao Institute ===
The Lubao Institute is in front of the Diosdado Macapagal Museum and Library which is at the back of his Bahay Kubo birthplace. Some meters from these 2 landmarks is the San Nicolas Lubao residence of Gloria Macapagal Arroyo. Lubao Institute or LI is the first and oldest private school in Lubao established in 1929.

=== Escolastica Romero District Hospital ===
The Escolastica Romero District Hospital located in San Nicolas 1st, Lubao and St. Joseph Hospital of Remedios located in Barangay Remedios, Lubao are the prime health institutions of the town.

=== San Agustin Church ===
The parish church of San Agustin (considered one of the oldest in Pampanga - 1572) was declared by the National Historical Commission as Important Cultural Property on August 28, 2013 (441st Founding Anniversary).

=== Other notable landmarks ===
- Diosdado Macapagal Birthplace House / Library & Museum
- Jose B. Lingad Park & Museum located at San Nicolas 1st, Lubao
- Lubao Bamboo Nature Park located at Santa Catalina, Lubao
- Pradera Verde situated at Barangay Prado Siongco, Lubao (venue of the annual Lubao International Balloon and Music Festival)
- Pradera Islands Theme Park

=== Baybay Ilog ===
Baybay Ilog (Sagip Ilog) is a project of Department of Tourism and Congresswoman Gloria Macapagal Arroyo. The symbolic river clean-up is the first step in preparing the people in 17 identified Barangays that will benefit from the Pampanga bayou river cruise project spearheaded by the local government units of Sasmuan and Lubao in cooperation with the Provincial government of Pampanga and the second district congressional office of Gloria Macapagal Arroyo.

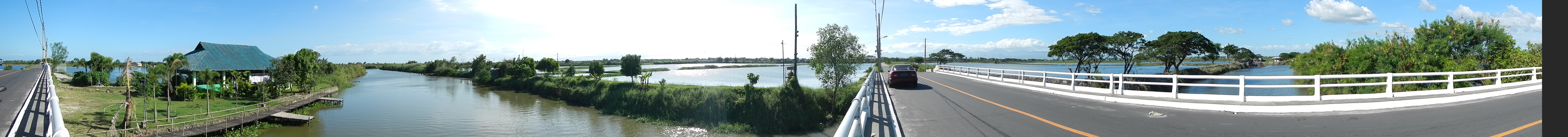
Panorama of Baybay Ilog (a project of Dept. of Tourism and Congresswoman Gloria Macapagal Arroyo)

== Education ==
There are two schools district office which govern all educational institutions within the municipality. They oversee the management and operations of all private and public, from primary to secondary schools. These are Lubao East Schools District Office, and Lubao West Schools District Office.

=== Primary and elementary schools ===
- Balantacan Elementary School
- Bancal Sinubli Elementary School
- Baruya Elementary School
- Bricks Preparatory and Learning School
- Bridgeport Montessori
- Calangain Elementary School
- Del Carmen Elementary School
- Dela Paz Elementary School
- Graciano Paule Elementary School
- Holy Rosary Academy
- Lauc Pao Elementary School
- Lubao Christian Ecumenical Academy
- Lubao Elementary School
- Maccim Royal Academy
- Prado Saba Elementary School
- Prado Siongco Elementary School
- Remedios Elementary School
- San Isidro Primary School
- San Pablo 1st Elementary School
- San Pablo 2nd Elementary School
- San Pedro Pal. Elementary School
- San Pedro Saug Elementary School
- San Roque Arbol Elementary School
- San Roque Dau-1 Academy
- Santiago Elementary School
- Shalom Chridren's Creative Learning Center
- Sta. Barbara Elementary School
- Sta. Cruz Academy
- Sta. Cruz Central School
- Sta. Lucia Elementary School
- Sta. Maria Elementary School
- Sta. Rita Elementary School
- Sta. Teresa 1st Ecumenical School
- Sta. Tereza 1st Elementary School
- Sta. Tereza 2nd Elementary School
- Theressian Academy

=== Secondary schools ===
- Bancal Pugad Integrated School
- Baruya National High School
- Del Carmen National High School
- Holy Cross Institute
- Lubao Institute
- Lubao National High School (Lubao Vocational School)
- Prado Siongco High School
- Remedios National High School
- San Jose Gumi Integrated School
- San Pablo 2nd National High School
- San Roque Arbol High School
- San Roque Dau National High School
- San Vicente National High School
- Santiago National High School
- Sta. Cruz High Integrated School
- Sta. Teresa II Integrated School
- Wenceslao Village High School

=== Higher educational institutions ===
- Pampanga State University - Lubao Campus
- Mother Theresa Colegio de Pampanga
- West Central College of Arts and Science

== Notable personalities ==
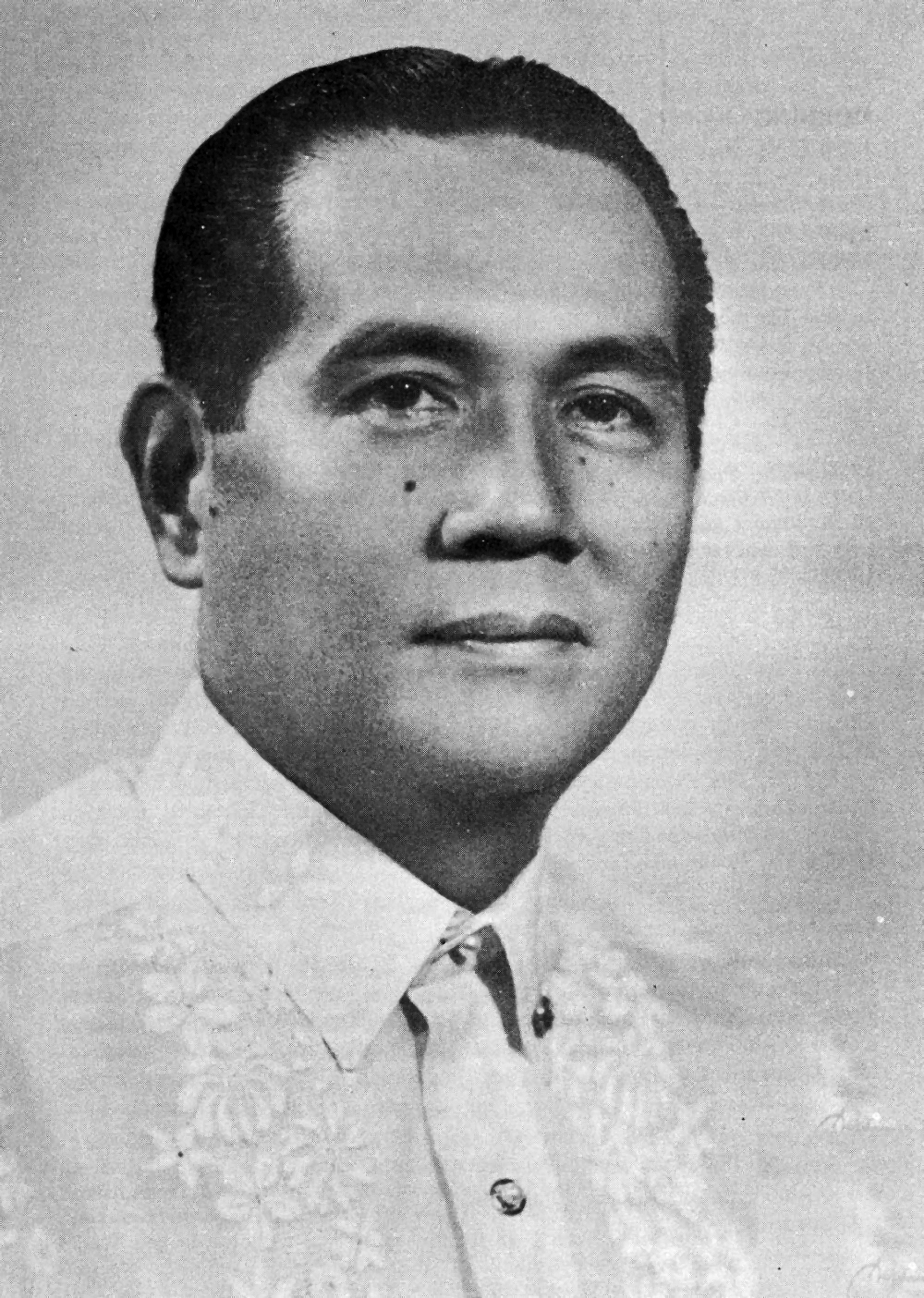
Diosdado Macapagal was the ninth President of the Philippines, serving from 1961 to 1965

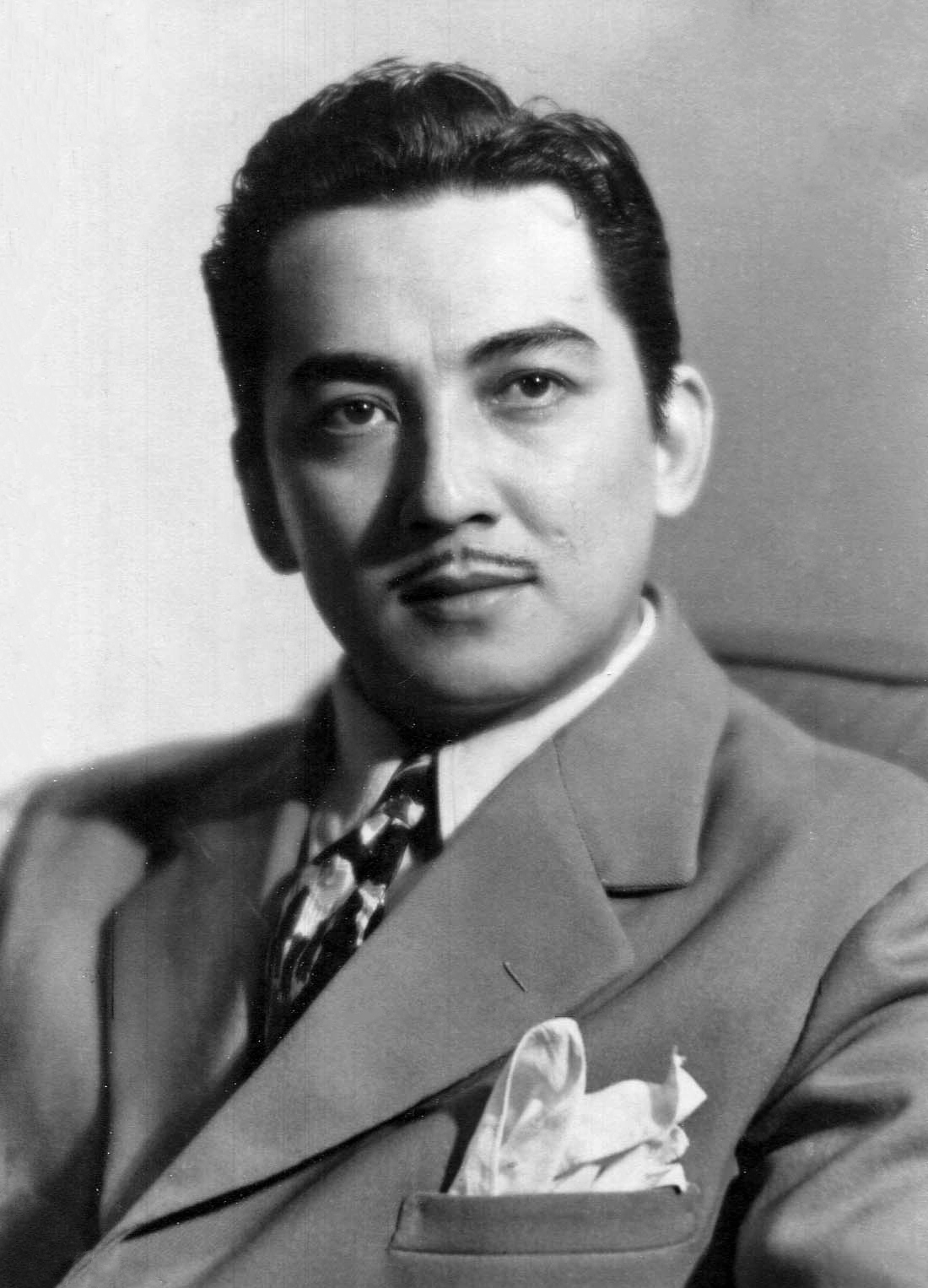
Rogelio de la Rosa was served as senator from 1957 to 1963

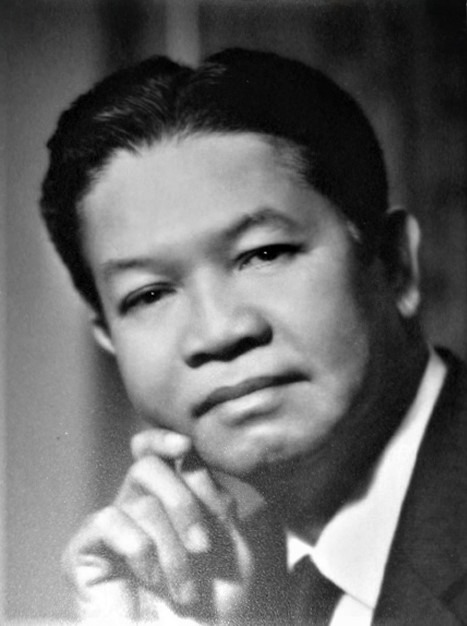
Jose B. Lingad was served as governor from 1947 to 1951 and congressman from 1969 to 1972

- Diosdado Macapagal - was a Filipino lawyer and politician who served as the 9th President of the Philippines, serving from 1961 to 1965.
- Angel Macapagal - Filipino lawyer and politician. He served as representative for Pampanga's 2nd congressional district from 1965 to 1969.
- Arturo Macapagal - was a Filipino shooter who competed at the 1972 and 1976 Summer Olympics at the free pistol event.
- Gloria Macapagal Arroyo - is a Filipino economist, academic and politician who served as the 14th president of the Philippines from 2001 until 2010, as the 10th vice president of the Philippines from 1998 to 2001 and a member of the House of Representatives representing the 2nd District of Pampanga since 2022 and previously from 2010 to 2019. Arroyo was the Speaker of the House of Representatives of the Philippines, from 2018 to 2019, and the first woman to hold the position.
- Mikey Arroyo - Filipino politician and former actor
- Zenaida Cruz-Ducut - Filipino lawyer and politician
- Ian Sangalang - is a PBA basketball player 4x Champion and an alumnus of Lubao Institute. Currently playing for Magnolia Hotshots
- Jose B. Lingad - was a Filipino lawyer and politician who served as provincial governor and congressman from Pampanga.
- Emigdio Lingad - Filipino economist and politician
- Rogelio de la Rosa - is one of the most popular Filipino matinee idols of the 20th century and elected to the Philippine Senate from 1957 to 1963.
- Jaime de la Rosa - is a Filipino pre-war and postwar actor better known as Jimmy in Philippine showbiz.
- Ato Agustin - better known as Ato "The Atom Bomb" Agustin, is a former Filipino professional basketball player.
- Cecile Licad - is a renowned Filipina virtuoso classical pianist.
- Gregorio Fernandez - was a Filipino film actor and director, and father of Rudy Fernandez.
- Rudy Fernandez - also known as "Daboy", was a multi-awarded Filipino actor and producer.
- Angela Fernando - is a fashion model and beauty queen from Lubao, Pampanga, Philippines.
- Isabel Preysler - is a Filipina-Spanish socialite with family roots from Lubao.
- Carlos Badion - Filipino basketball player.
- Apollo Quiboloy - is a Filipino pastor and church leader of the Philippines-based Restorationist church called the Kingdom of Jesus Christ (KJC).
- Bienvenido Santos - Filipino-American fiction, poetry and nonfiction writer
- Letty Alonzo - former actress
- Mercedes Arrastia-Tuason - diplomat and former ambassador to the Holy See
- Hugo Gutierrez Jr. - Filipino jurist and civil liberties advocate. He served as an Associate Justice of the Supreme Court of the Philippines from May 14, 1982, until March 31, 1993.
- Bong Pineda - Filipino businessman
- Milagros D. Ibe - Filipino mathematics teacher
