= 1999 Luzon earthquake =

Earthquake in the Philippines

- Manila Trench (Philippines) Epicenter of the earthquake. Near the west coast of Luzon is the seismically active Manila Trench.
- UTC time: 1999-12-11 18:03:36
- ISC event: 1658129
- USGS-ANSS: ComCat
- Local date: December 12, 1999
- Local time: 2:03:26 am (PhST)
- Duration: 27 seconds
- Magnitude: M_{w} 7.3 6.8 M_{s}
- Depth: 33 km (21 mi)
- Epicenter: 15°45′58″N 119°44′24″E; Off the coast of Zambales
- Areas affected: Zambales, Pangasinan, and Metro Manila
- Max. intensity: PEIS VII (MMI VIII)
- Casualties: 6 dead, 40 injured

On 12 December 1999, a M_{w} 7.3 earthquake struck the northern coast of Zambales in the Philippines. It was felt in various provinces on the island of Luzon including as far north as Ilocos Norte and as far south as Quezon. This is the second earthquake with a magnitude of 7 to hit the area in 10 years with a M_{w} 7.7 earthquake having occurred in 1990 which killed more than 2,000 people.

== Impact ==
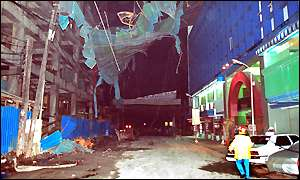
Damaged building as a result of the 1999 Luzon Earthquake.

The earthquake resulted in at least 6 deaths and 40 injuries within the regions of Zambales, Pangasinan, and Manila. Of the 40 injuries, 30 were reported in the provinces of Zambales and Pangasinan, while the other 10 were from the Manila metropolitan area. Infrastructure in Zambales and Pangasinan, things like bridges and water pumping stations, was also damaged to a minor extent. Many hotels and hospitals in the region had to be evacuated as well. Thirty houses and two churches in Zambales were damaged. In Manila several government buildings were damaged including the Department of public work and highways. Power outages continued for 33 hours past the original earthquake in various parts of Manila. Raymundo Punongbayan, director of the Philippine Institute of Volcanology and Seismology, said that the damage to structures was minimal due to the earthquake's hypo-center being offshore and over 60 kilometers underground. The earthquake also caused power interruptions in the region for the second time that week, further increasing widespread panic. Two days prior to the earthquake, much of Luzon was without power as a result of a large amount of jellyfish that were reportedly sucked into the cooling systems of three major power plants.

== Reaction and response ==
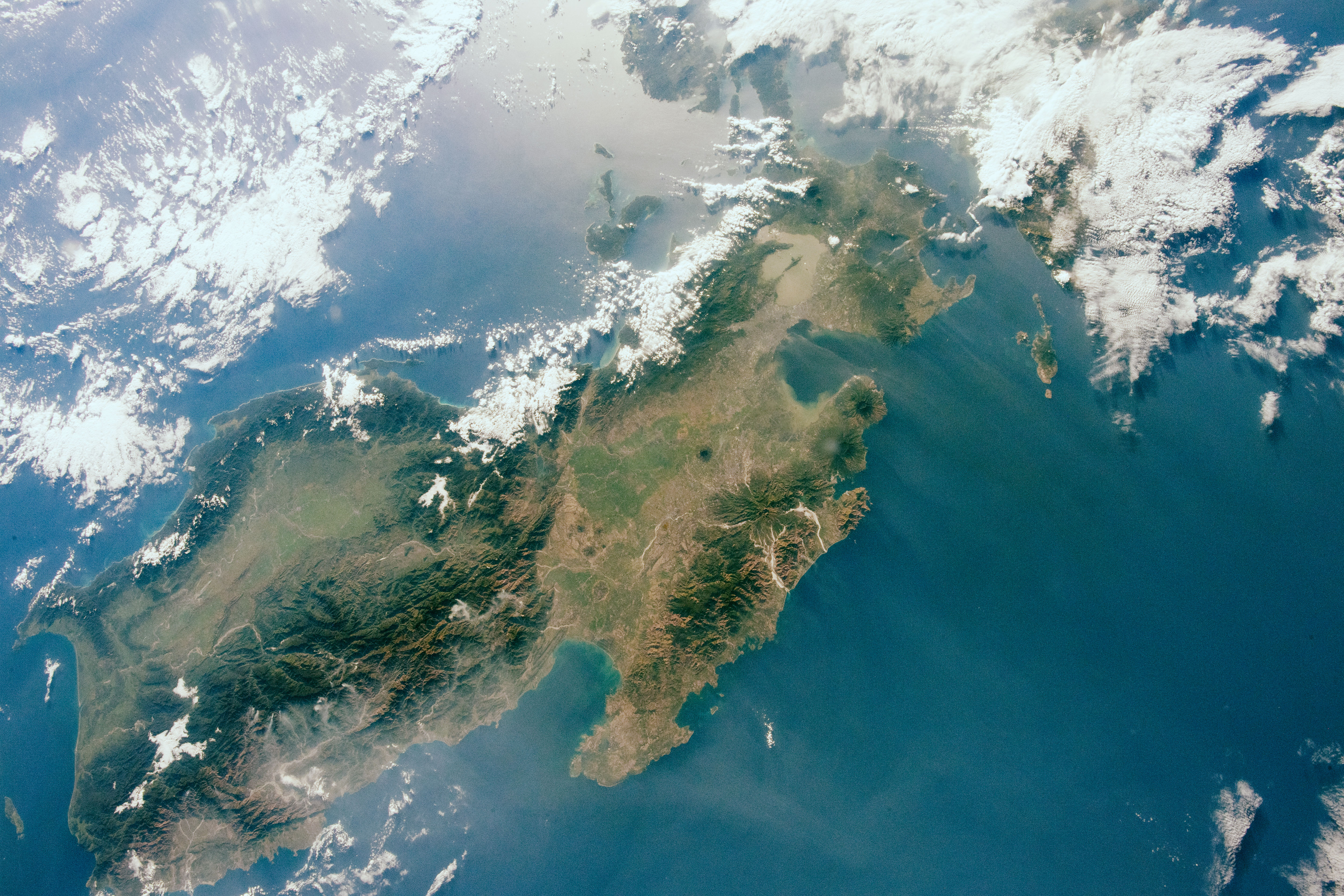
Luzon Island from the ISS

Compared to the devastating 7.8 M earthquake that occurred in Luzon in 1990, which caused over 2,400 deaths and $695,000 (USD) in damage, the 1999 Luzon earthquake, caused substantially less damage while being of similar magnitudes. The earthquake caused moderate destruction to buildings and other infrastructures near the epicenter and surrounding areas. There were few casualties and injuries from the event and most of the population received little to no harm from this high magnitude earthquake. Of the six fatalities, only two occurred due to fallen debris while the other four were due to elderly people experiencing heart attacks.

The government took measures to spread awareness to its citizens and enforce individuals to relocate to safer environment as a result of destructive earthquakes that occurred in the years prior. Philippines Defense Secretary Orlando S. Mercado attributed the minimal damage and casualties to the government's disaster preparedness program. The Philippine government implemented routine fire and earthquake drills in hospitals and other public establishments following the devastating 1999 Jiji earthquake that occurred earlier that year. As a result, many took shelter and were able to secure locations where they would be more equipped to the earthquake.

== See also ==
- List of earthquakes in 1999
- List of earthquakes in the Philippines
- 2019 Luzon earthquake (epicenter also in Zambales, which occurred 20 years later)
- 1990 Luzon earthquake
- 2022 Luzon earthquake
