= San Agustin Church (Lubao) =

Roman Catholic church in Pampanga, Philippines

Lubao Church
- San Agustin Parish Church
- Saint Augustine Parish Church
- Iglesia Parroquial de San Agustín (Spanish)
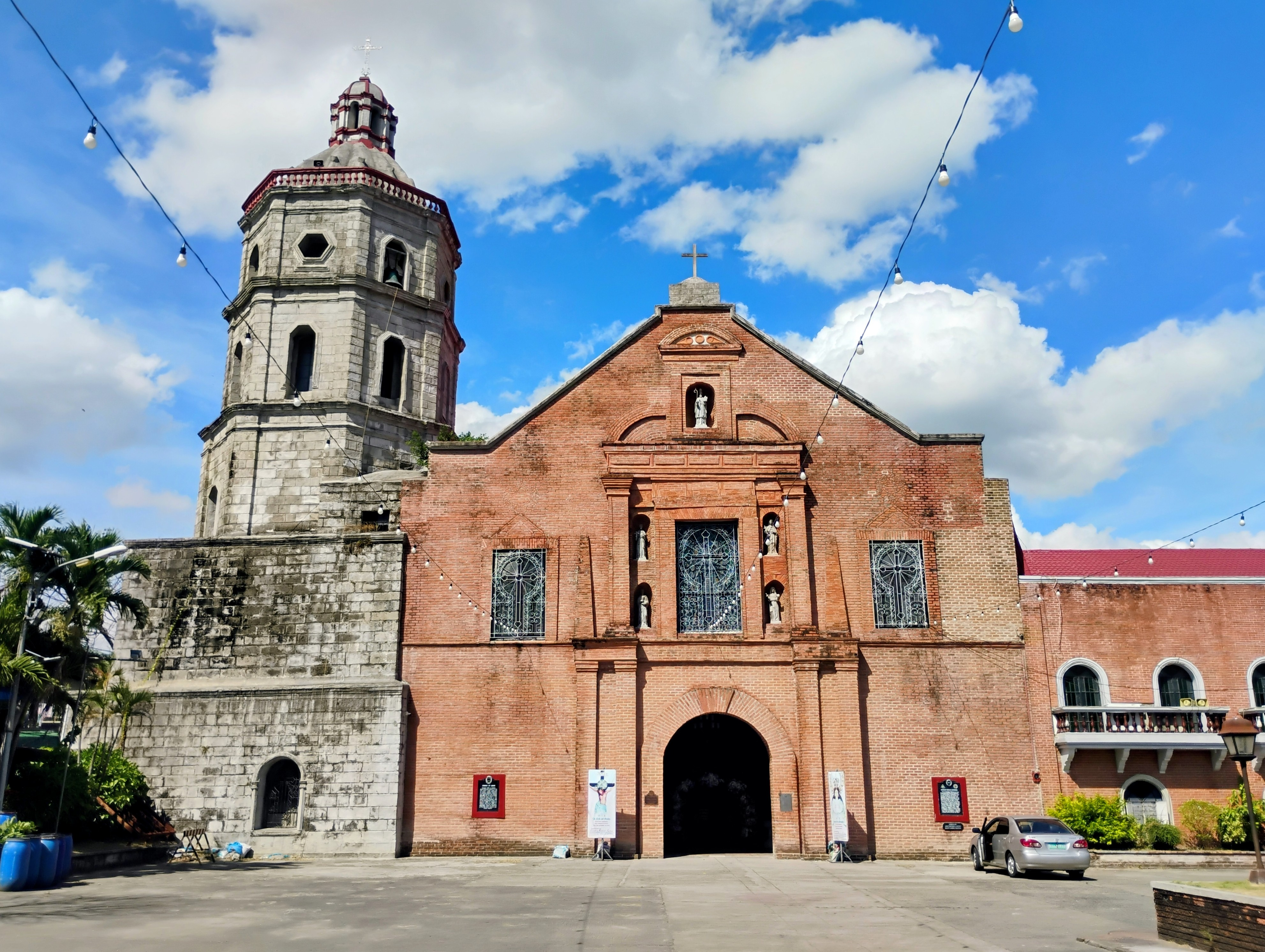
- Church facade in 2026

- Location in Luzon Location in the Philippines
- 14°56′19″N 120°36′06″E
- Location: San Nicolas 1st, Lubao, Pampanga
- Country: Philippines
- Denomination: Roman Catholic

History
- Status: Parish church
- Founded: 1572
- Dedication: St. Augustine of Hippo

Architecture
- Heritage designation: Important Cultural Property
- Designated: August 2013
- Architect: Fr. Antonio Herrera
- Architectural type: Church building
- Style: Baroque; Neoclassical
- Groundbreaking: 1614
- Completed: 1638

Specifications
- Length: 82.45 metres (270.5 ft)
- Width: 21.12 metres (69.3 ft)
- Height: 10.50 metres (34.4 ft)
- Materials: Sand, gravel, cement, mortar, steel and bricks

Administration
- Archdiocese: San Fernando

Clergy
- Archbishop: Most. Rev. Florentino G. Lavarias
- Priest: Rev. Fr. Arnold S. Rivera

San Agustin Parish Church, commonly known as Lubao Church or Matuang Pisamban, is a 17th-century Neo-classic, Spanish stone and brick Roman Catholic church located at Brgy. San Nicolas 1st, Lubao, Pampanga, Philippines. It is under the jurisdiction of the Archdiocese of San Fernando. In 1952, a historical marker bearing a brief history of the structure was installed on the facade of the church by the Historical Committee of the Philippines, precursor of the National Historical Commission of the Philippines. In 2013, the church was declared by the National Museum of the Philippines as an Important Cultural Property.

== History ==
Lubao has been annexed to Tondo as a visita (mission) on May 3, 1572. Soon after, on March 5, 1575, Father Provincial Alfonso Alvarado was assigned to lead the convent of Lubao. The volume of baptisms signed on the baptismal book of Lubao attests to the importance of Lubao as a missionary center.

The history of the current edifice has several versions. One source tells of a Fr. Juan Gallegos, assigned as the first resident priest of Lubao, who organized the early settlement and made the church structures of light materials in a place called Sitio Sapang Pare, a landing place for missionaries coming in from Manila Bay and the tributaries of the Pampanga River. Eventually, the settlement was transferred to its present site. Other sources assert that it was Father Francisco Coronel who founded and established the town at its present site and started building the current edifice. Still other references refute this claim stating that Father Coronel had only stayed in Lubao in 1613 and never came back. Father Jeronimo de Venasque continued the construction in 1635 and it was completed by Father Francisco Figueroa in 1638. Father Antonio Bravo did some repair work in 1877, and in 1893 Father Antonio Moradillo commissioned Italian artists Dibella and Alberoni to paint the ceiling of the nave, along with other ornamentations. The cemetery chapel and stone gate have also been attributed to Father Moradilla. The church and convent were occupied by the Philippine revolutionaries in 1898. They were damaged in 1945 by Japanese bombing during World War II and in 1952 during a strong typhoon. The church was restored in 1954.

=== 2019 Luzon earthquake ===
On April 22, 2019, a 6.1 magnitude earthquake struck the island of Luzon in the Philippines, leaving at least 18 dead, three missing and injuring at least 256 others. Despite the epicenter being in Zambales, most of the damage to infrastructure occurred in the neighboring province of Pampanga, which suffered damage to 29 buildings and structures, including churches.

During the 2019 Luzon earthquake, the church's belfry collapsed. Rebuilding the belfry and repairing the church's floor cost more than 10 million pesos.

== Architecture ==
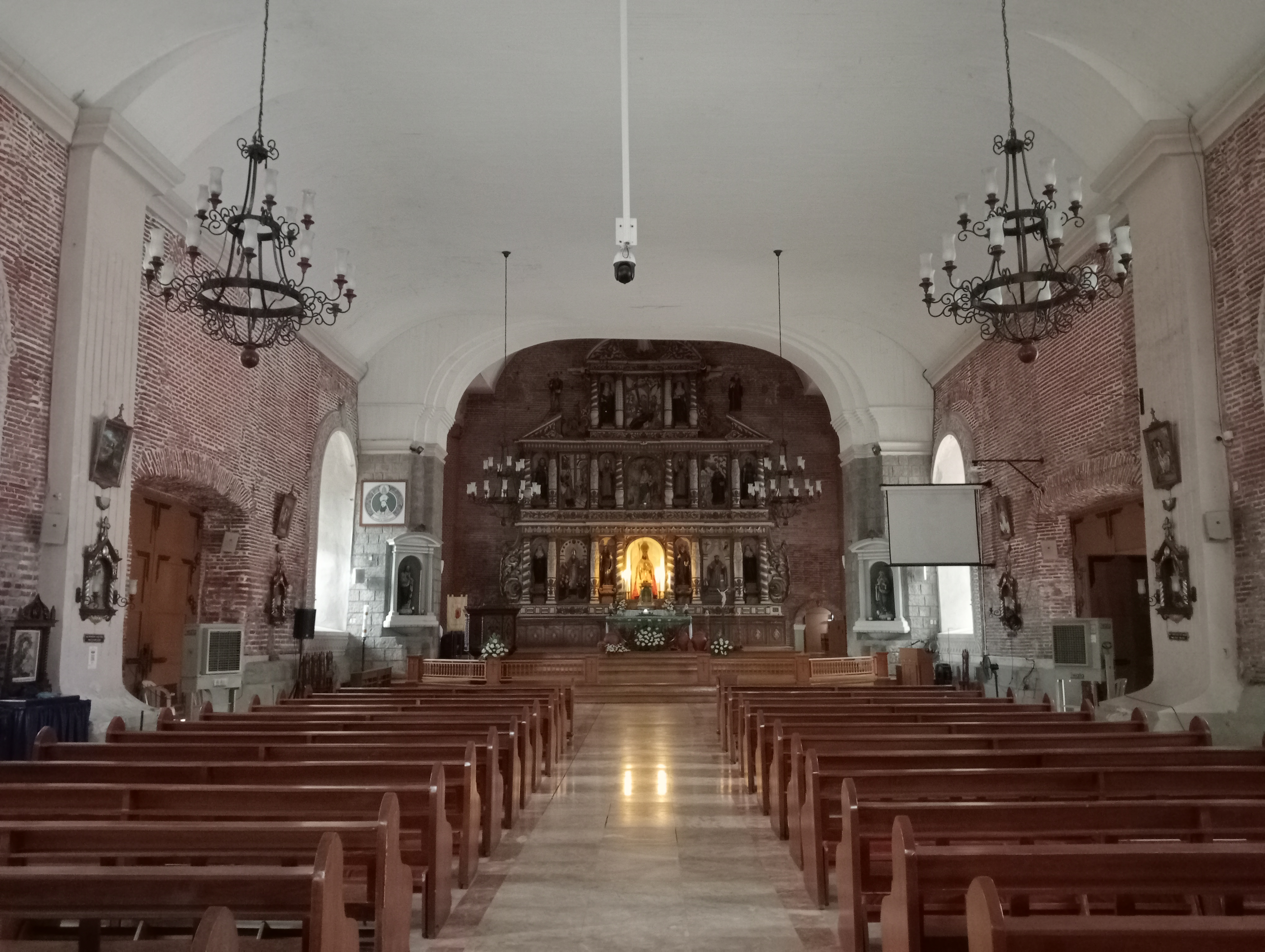
Church interior in 2024

The church measures 82.45 metres (270.5 ft) long, 21.12 metres (69.3 ft) wide and 10.50 metres (34.4 ft) high with stone and brick walls 2.46 metres (8 ft 1 in) thick. The five-story bell tower attached to the left of the facade is 31 metres (102 ft) high. The flat surface of facade is bare of ornamentation save for the central retablo of niches, fluted pilasters and Ionic columns in Neoclassical style. The facade has one semicircular-arched main door and three rectangular windows on the second level. The facade is crowned by an imaginary triangular pediment topped by a cross. As of 2014, the rough brick surface of the facade had been replaced.

== Inscriptions on the church structure ==
To recognize the cultural significance of the San Agustin Church, three significant inscriptions have been placed on the church: one from the National Historical Committee, (now the National Historical Commission of the Philippines), the parish of Lubao, and the National Museum of the Philippines:

1952 National Historical Committee marker

Inscription – Church of Lubao	Marker
Founded in 1572 in Barrio Santa Catalina. Moved to this site thirty years later due to yearly floods. Architect Fr. Antonio Herrera, Augustinian, constructed this church, 1614–1630, out of locally made brick and sand mixed in egg albumen contributed by the people of Lubao. Occupied 1898 by the Revolutionists. Used as hospital 1899 by American Forces. Destroyed 1942 by Japanese shelling. Repaired 1949–1952, under the direction of Fr. Melencio Garcia and other priests.	

1982 Lubao Parish Church commemorative marker for President Diosdado P. Macapagal

Inscription – Diosdado Pangan Macapagal	Marker
Fifth President, Republic of the Philippines (1961–1965) and president, 1971 Constitutional Convention, also Lawyer Doctor of Laws Doctor of Economics Educator, Diplomat, Congressman and Vice-President of the Philippines. Born in Lubao, Pampanga September 28, 1910, was baptized in this church, October 12, 1910, by Fr. Francisco de la Banda, of parents Urbano and Romana (Midwife: Escolastica Romero). Sponsor: Angel Javier, Book 32, Page 98, Entry 4. Fr. Pedro Diez, parish priest. This marker placed by Rev. Fr. Gregorio P. Binuya II, parish priest on President Macapagal's 72nd baptismal year for perpetual memory of [his] baptism and birth.	

2013 National Museum of the Philippines marker for Important Cultural Property

In accordance with the requirements of the National Museum in declaring Important Cultural Properties, the San Agustin church has been declared as such because of its significant architectural features and altarpiece. According to the National Museum, the Important Cultural Property title is the second highest title granted by the institution to heritage structures (next to the National Cultural Treasure). Accordingly, the San Agustin church did not pass requirements to be declared a National Cultural Treasure because what remains of the original structure is less than 60 percent.

Inscription – Important Cultural Property	Marker
Approximate English Translation: To its outstanding significance to the Filipino cultural heritage, the parish church of Saint Augustine, Lubao, Pampanga is declared an Important Cultural Property. National Museum, August 28, 2013.	

== Gallery ==
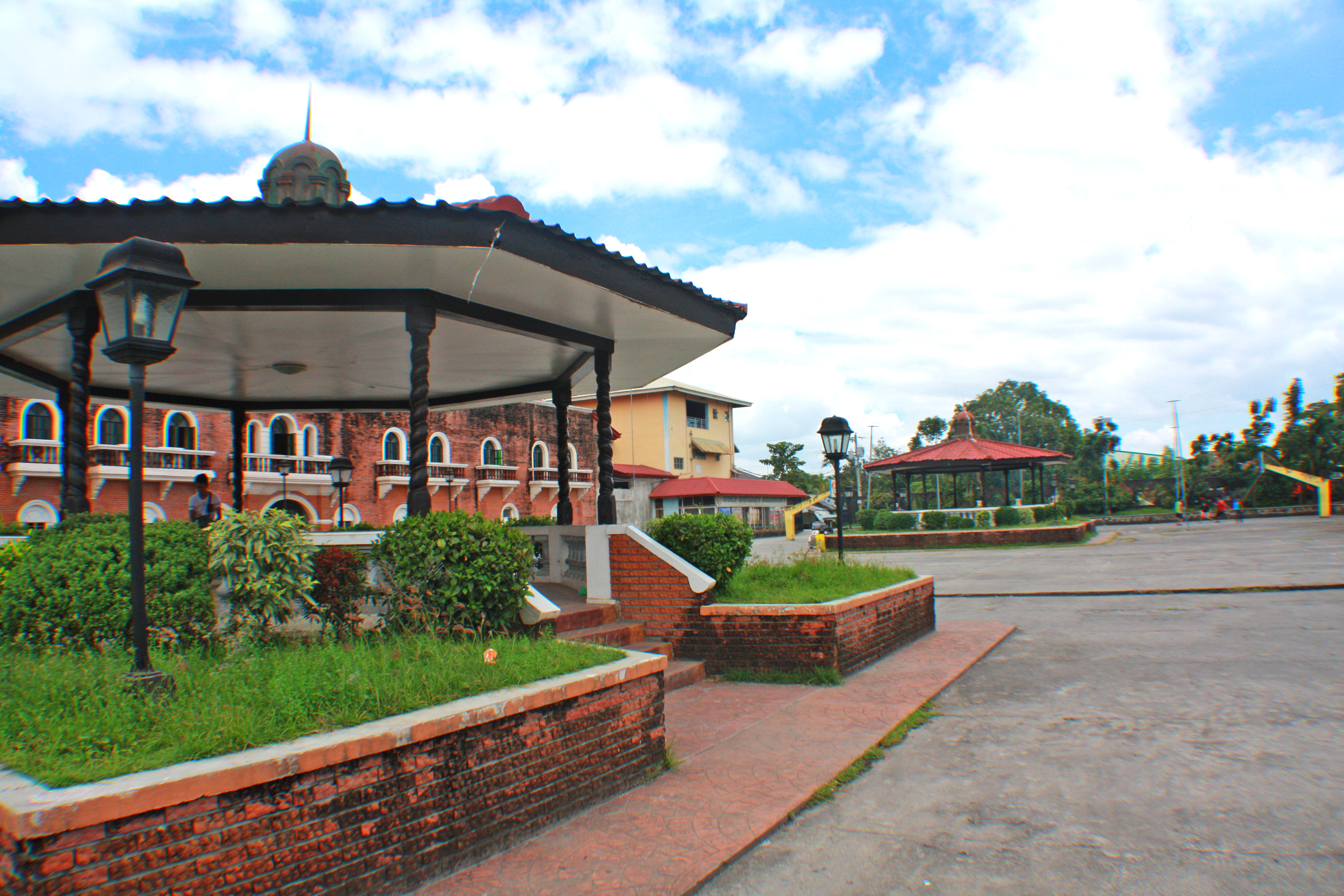
Glorietta

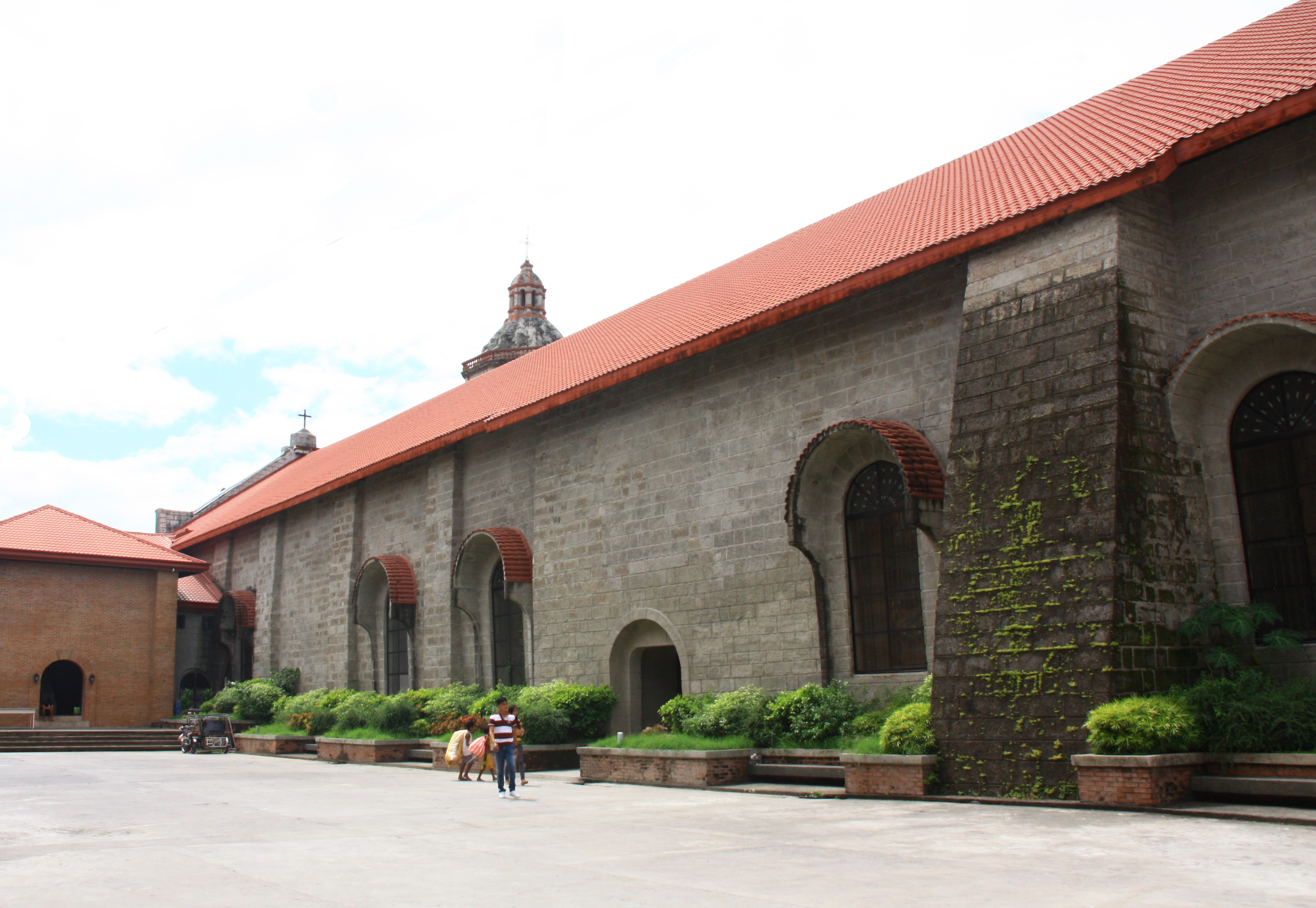
Side wall featuring a thick buttress

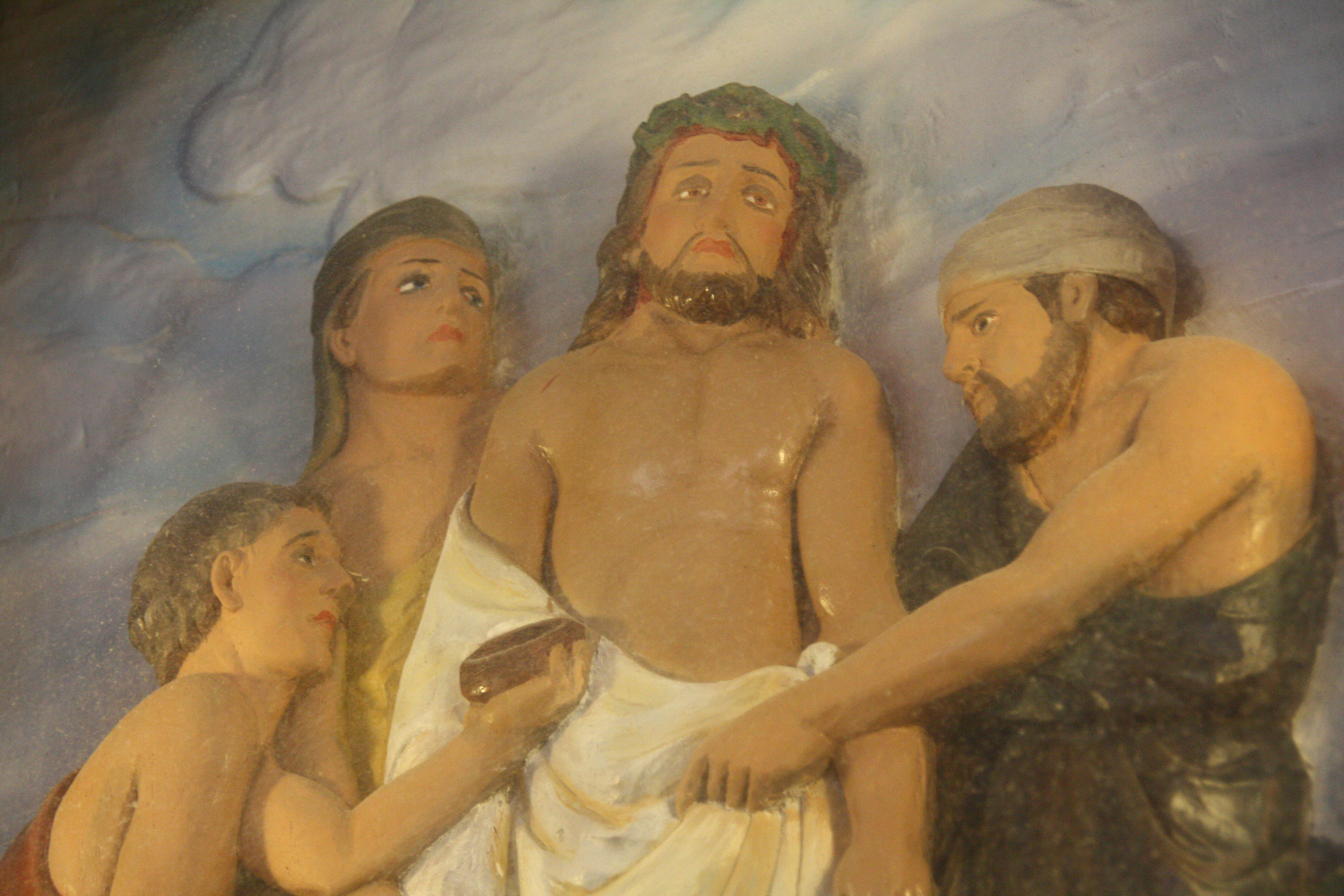
Stations of the Cross relief details

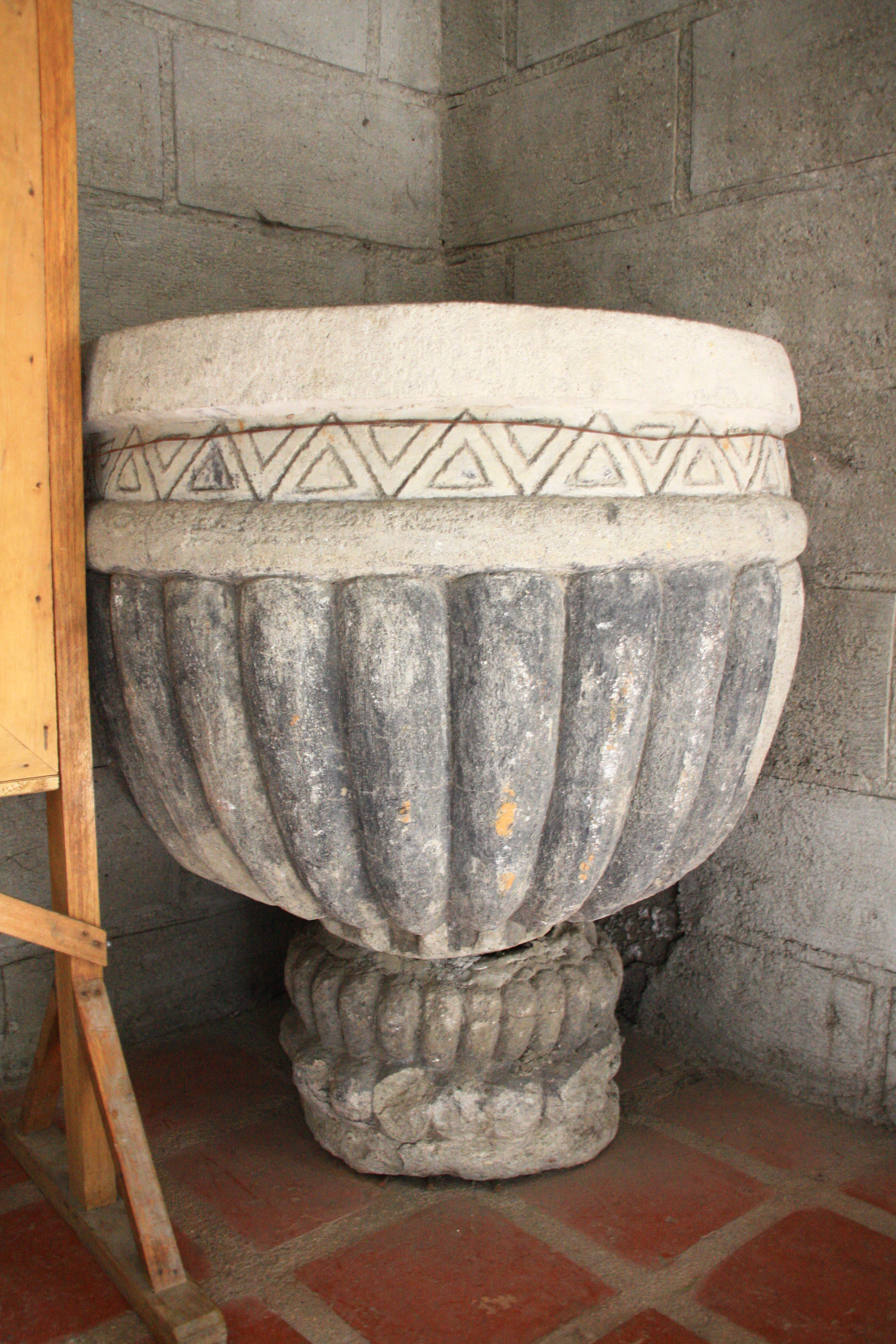
Baptismal font

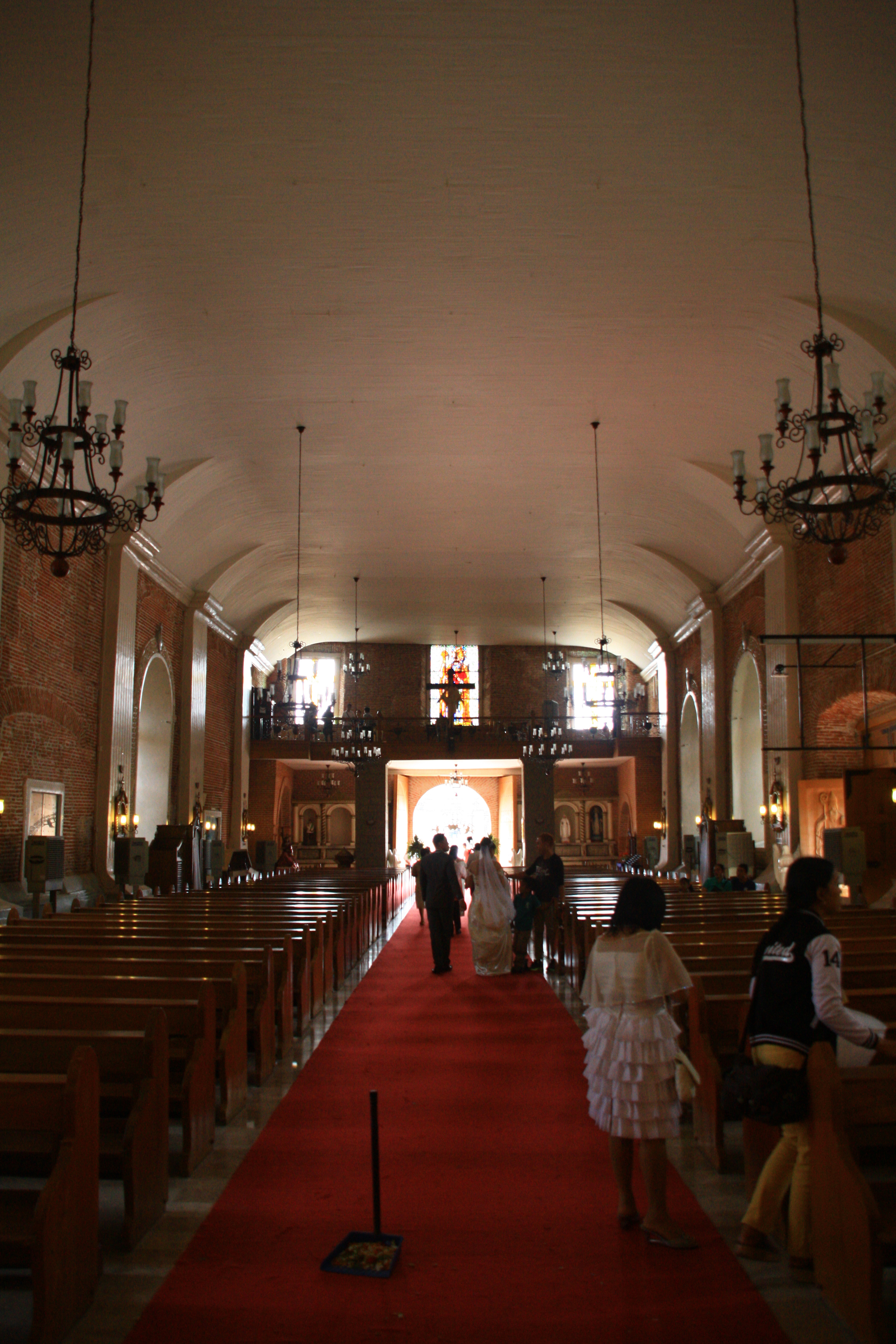
View of the church nave from the main altar

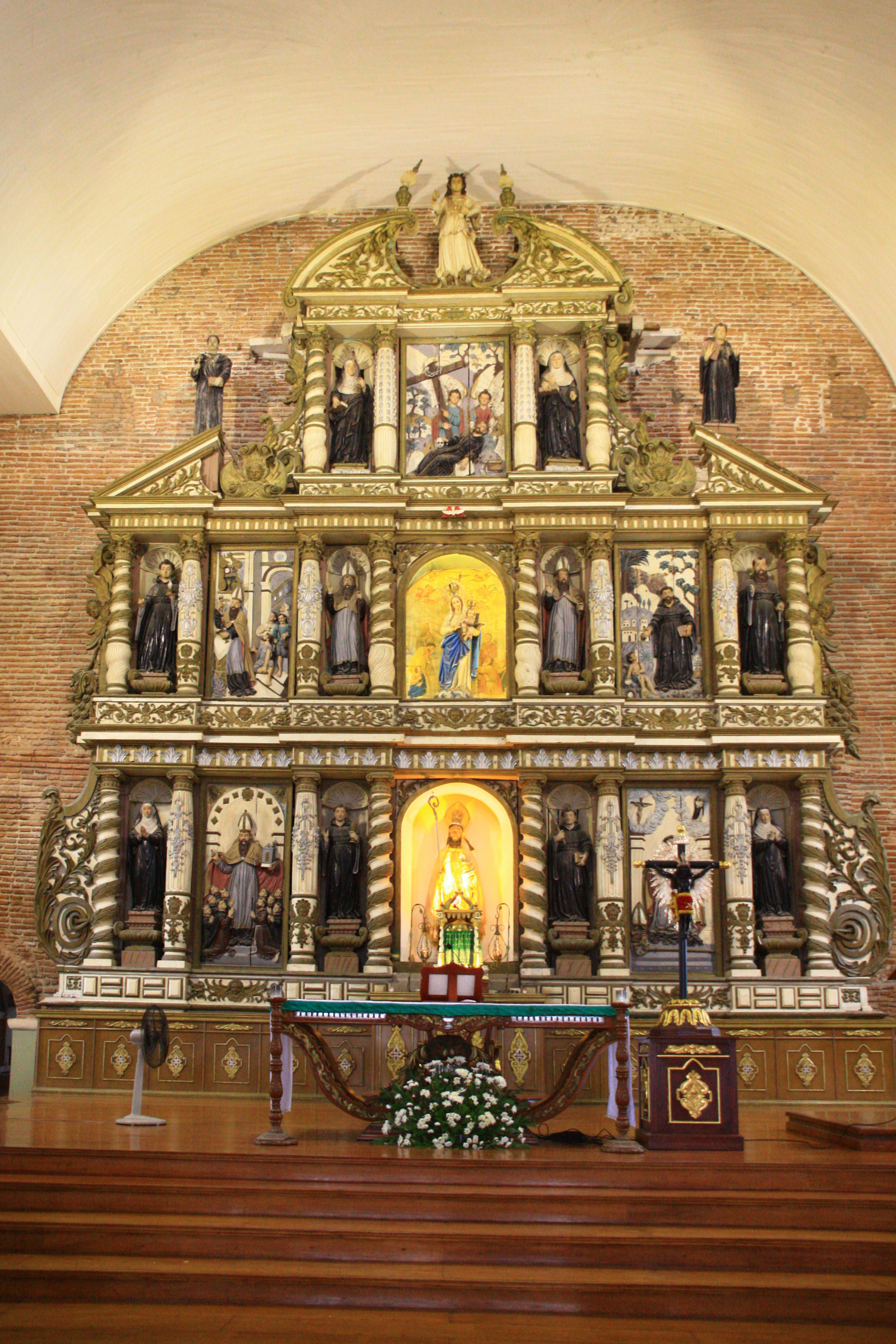
Main altarpiece/retablo

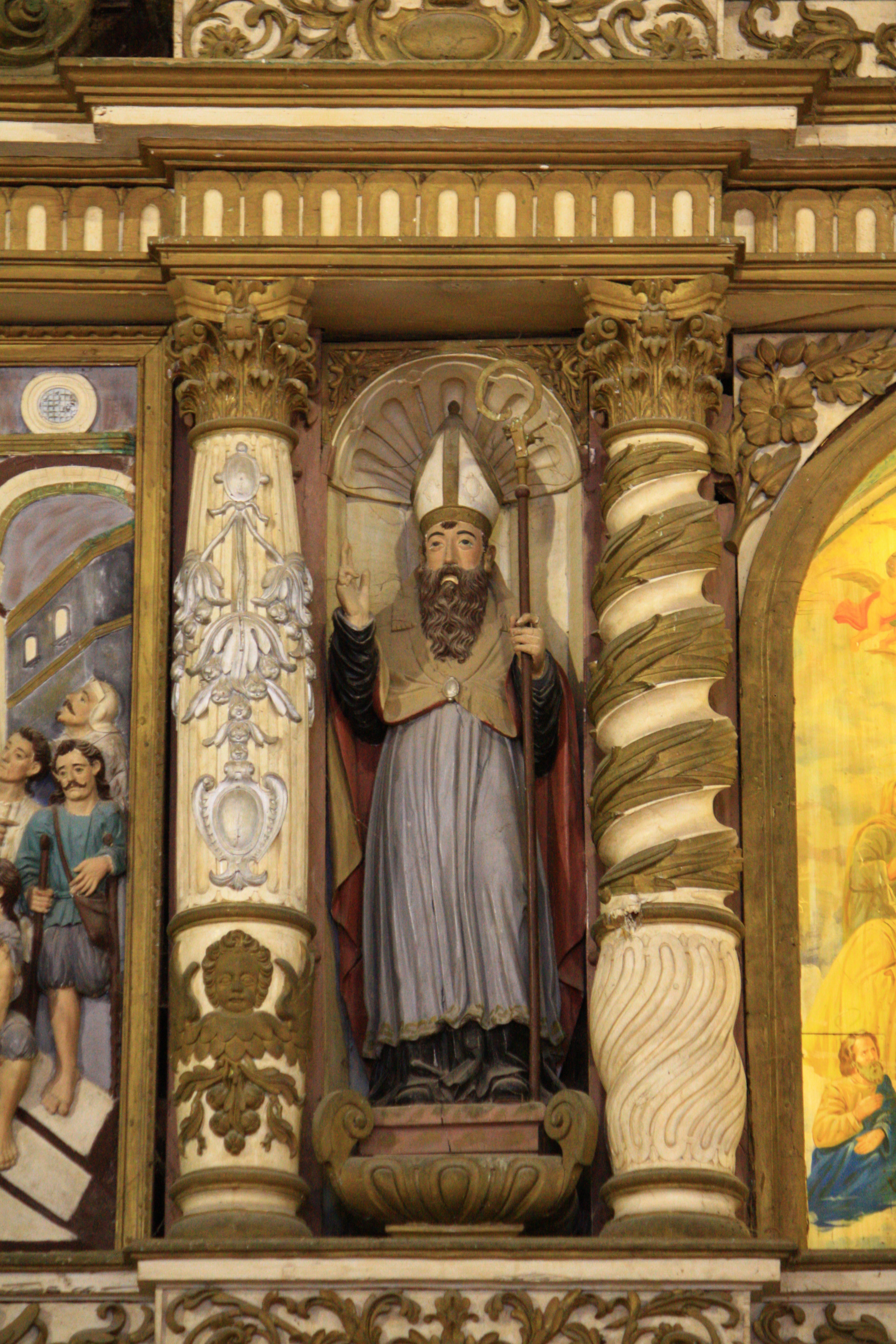
Relief of a saint

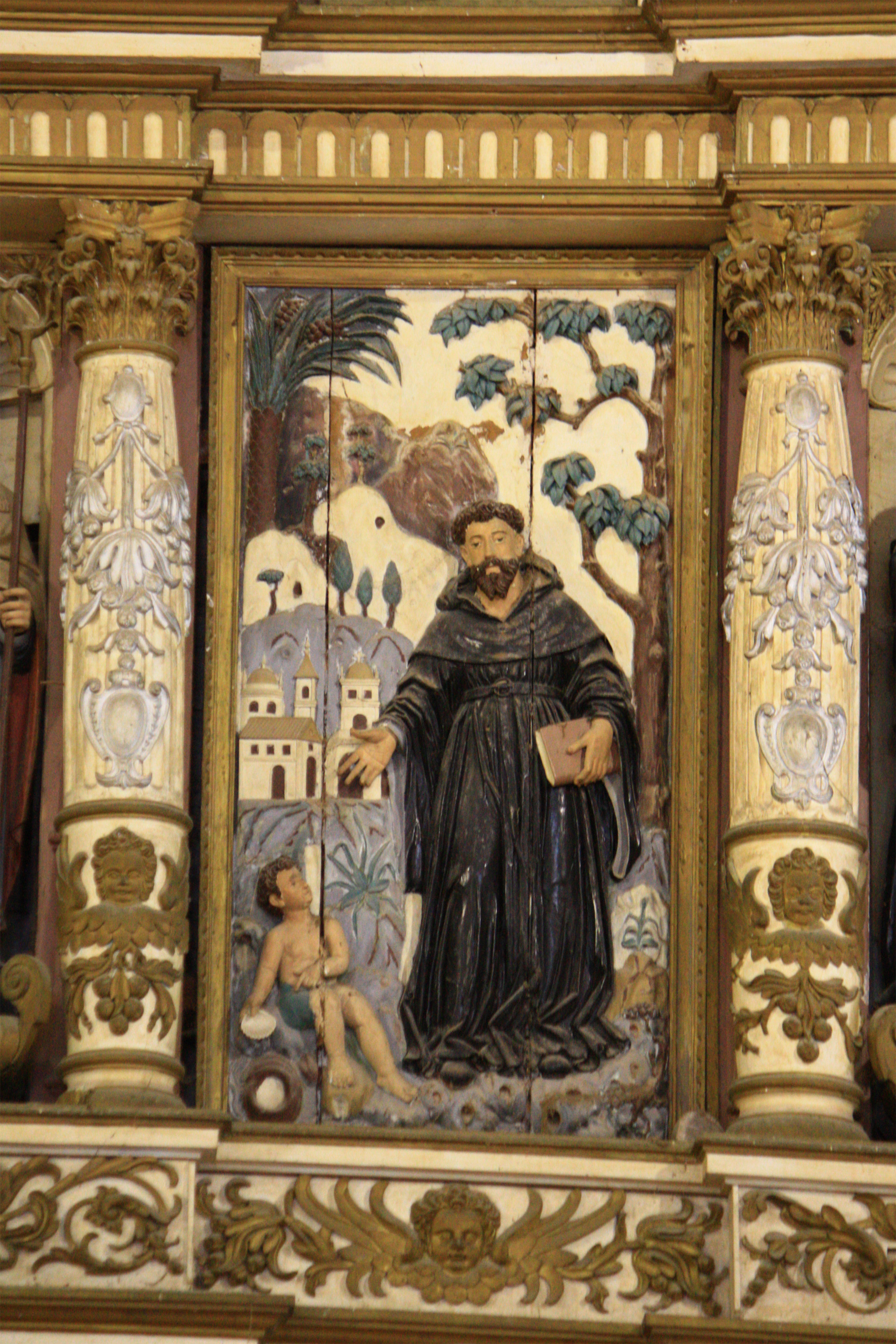
Relief of a depiction of Saint Augustine's life

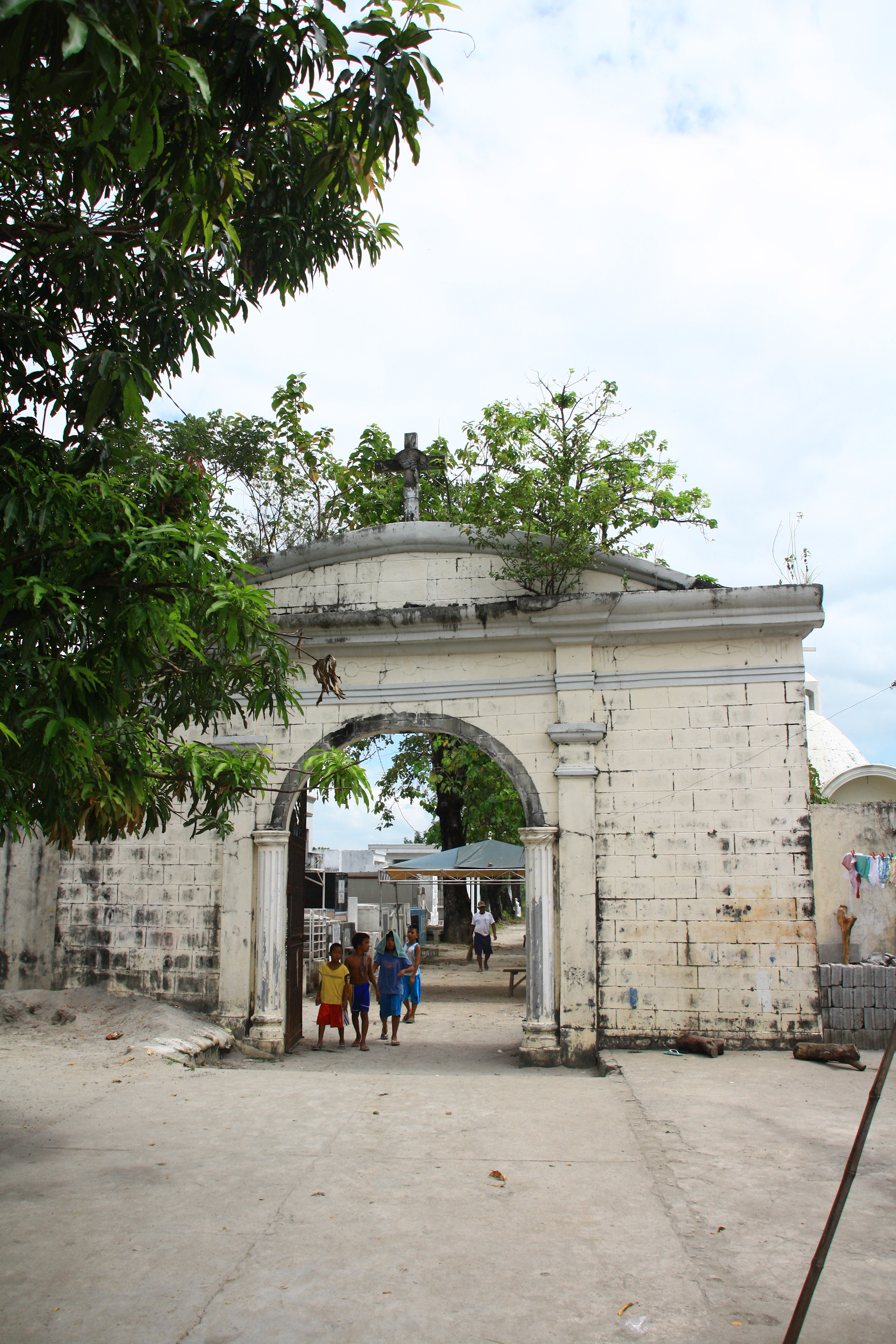
Catholic cemetery gate

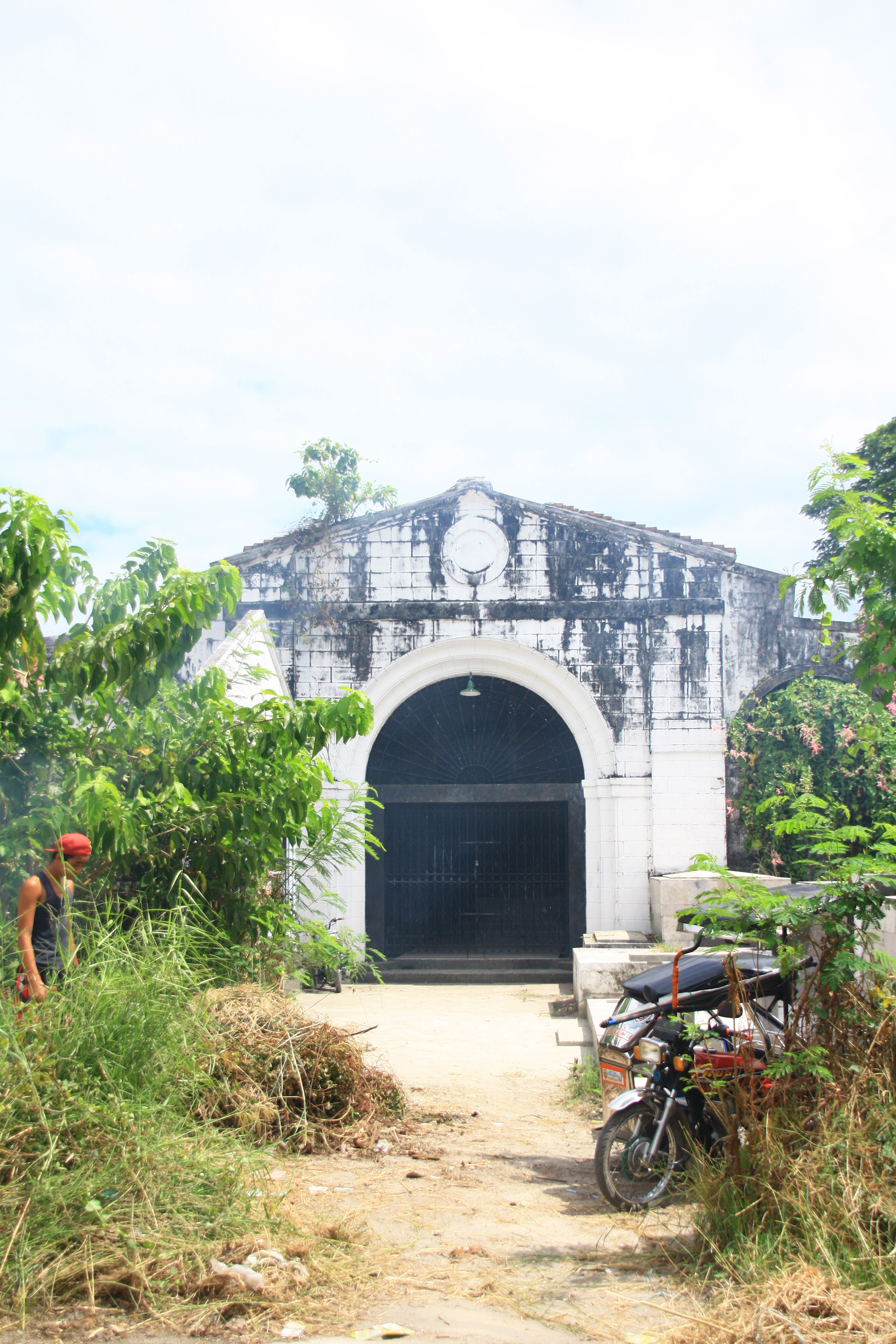
Mausoleum

== See also ==
- List of Cultural Properties of the Philippines
